= Comparison of user features of messaging platforms =

Comparison of user features of messaging platforms refers to a comparison of all the various user features of various electronic instant messaging platforms. This includes a wide variety of resources; it includes standalone apps, platforms within websites, computer software, and various internal functions available on specific devices, such as iMessage for iPhones.

This entry includes only the features and functions that shape the user experience for such apps. A comparison of the underlying system components, programming aspects, and other internal technical information, is outside the scope of this entry.

== Overview and background ==
Instant messaging technology is a type of online chat that offers real-time text transmission over the Internet. A LAN messenger operates in a similar way over a local area network. Short messages are typically transmitted between two parties when each user chooses to complete a thought and select "send". Some IM applications can use push technology to provide real-time text, which transmits messages character by character, as they are composed. More advanced instant messaging can add file transfer, clickable hyperlinks, Voice over IP, or video chat.

Non-IM types of chat include multicast transmission, usually referred to as "chat rooms", where participants might be anonymous or might be previously known to each other (for example collaborators on a project that is using chat to facilitate communication). Instant messaging systems tend to facilitate connections between specified known users (often using a contact list also known as a "buddy list" or "friend list"). Depending on the IM protocol, the technical architecture can be peer-to-peer (direct point-to-point transmission) or client-server (an Instant message service center retransmits messages from the sender to the communication device).

By 2010, instant messaging over the Web was in sharp decline, in favor of messaging features on social networks. The most popular IM platforms were terminated, such as AIM which closed down and Windows Live Messenger which merged into Skype. Instant messaging has since seen a revival in popularity in the form of "messaging apps" (usually on mobile devices) which by 2014 had more users than social networks.

As of 2010, social networking providers often offer IM abilities. Facebook Chat is a form of instant messaging, and Twitter can be thought of as a Web 2.0 instant messaging system. Similar server-side chat features are part of most dating websites, such as OkCupid or PlentyofFish. The spread of smartphones and similar devices in the late 2000s also caused increased competition with conventional instant messaging, by making text messaging services still more ubiquitous.

Many instant messaging services offer video calling features, voice over IP and web conferencing services. Web conferencing services can integrate both video calling and instant messaging abilities. Some instant messaging companies are also offering desktop sharing, IP radio, and IPTV to the voice and video features.

The term "Instant Messenger" is a service mark of Time Warner and may not be used in software not affiliated with AOL in the United States. For this reason, in April 2007, the instant messaging client formerly named Gaim (or gaim) announced that they would be renamed "Pidgin".

In the 2010s, more people started to use messaging apps on modern computers and devices like WhatsApp, WeChat, Viber, Facebook Messenger, Telegram, Signal and Line rather than instant messaging on computers like AIM and Windows Live Messenger. For example, WhatsApp was founded in 2009, and Facebook acquired in 2014, by which time it already had half a billion users.

=== Concepts ===
==== Backchannel ====
Backchannel is the practice of using networked computers to maintain a real-time online conversation alongside the primary group activity or live spoken remarks. The term was coined in the field of linguistics to describe listeners' behaviours during verbal communication. (See Backchannel (linguistics).)

The term "backchannel" generally refers to online conversation about the conference topic or speaker. Occasionally backchannel provides audience members a chance to fact-check the presentation.

First growing in popularity at technology conferences, backchannel is increasingly a factor in education where WiFi connections and laptop computers allow participants to use ordinary chat like IRC or AIM to actively communicate during presentation. More recent research include works where the backchannel is brought publicly visible, such as the ClassCommons, backchan.nl and Fragmented Social Mirror.

Twitter is also widely used today by audiences to create backchannels during broadcasting of content or at conferences. For example, television drama, other forms of entertainment and magazine programs. This practice is often also called live tweeting. Many conferences nowadays also have a hashtag that can be used by the participants to share notes and experiences; furthermore such hashtags can be user generated.

== Features ==
Various platforms and apps are distinguished by their strengths and features in regards to specific functions.

=== Official channels ===
Some apps include a feature known as "official channels" which allows companies, especially news media outlets, publications, and other mass media companies, to offer an official channel, which users can join, and thereby receive regular updates, published articles, or news updates from companies or news outlets. Two apps which have a large amount of such channels available are Line and Telegram.

== Basic default platforms ==
Basic platforms which are common across entire categories of mobile devices, computers, or operating systems.

=== SMS ===
SMS (short message service) is a text messaging service component of most telephone, Internet, and mobile device systems. It uses standardized communication protocols to enable mobile devices to exchange short text messages. An intermediary service can facilitate a text-to-voice conversion to be sent to landlines.

SMS, as used on modern devices, originated from radio telegraphy in radio memo pagers that used standardized phone protocols. These were defined in 1985 as part of the Global System for Mobile Communications (GSM) series of standards. The first test SMS message was sent on December 3, 1992, when Neil Papwort, a test engineer for Sema Group, used a personal computer to send "Merry Christmas" to the phone of colleague Richard Jarvis. It commercially rolled out to many cellular networks that decade. SMS became hugely popular worldwide as a way of text communication. By the end of 2010, SMS was the most widely used data application, with an estimated 3.5 billion active users, or about 80% of all mobile phone subscribers.

The protocols allowed users to send and receive messages of up to 160 characters (when entirely alpha-numeric) to and from GSM mobiles. Although most SMS messages are sent from one mobile phone to another, support for the service has expanded to include other mobile technologies, such as ANSI CDMA networks and Digital AMPS.

Mobile marketing, a type of direct marketing, uses SMS. According to a 2018 market research report the global SMS messaging business was estimated to be worth over US$100 billion, accounting for almost 50 percent of all the revenue generated by mobile messaging.

A Flash SMS is a type of SMS that appears directly on the main screen without user interaction and is not automatically stored in the inbox. It can be useful in emergencies, such as a fire alarm or cases of confidentiality, as in delivering one-time passwords.

==== Threaded SMS format ====
Threaded SMS is a visual styling orientation of SMS message history that arranges messages to and from a contact in chronological order on a single screen.

It was first invented by a developer working to implement the SMS client for the BlackBerry, who was looking to make use of the blank screen left below the message on a device with a larger screen capable of displaying far more than the usual 160 characters, and was inspired by threaded Reply conversations in email.

Visually, this style of representation provides a back-and-forth chat-like history for each individual contact. Hierarchical-threading at the conversation-level (as typical in blogs and on-line messaging boards) is not widely supported by SMS messaging clients. This limitation is due to the fact that there is no session identifier or subject-line passed back and forth between sent and received messages in the header data (as specified by SMS protocol) from which the client device can properly thread an incoming message to a specific dialogue, or even to a specific message within a dialogue.

Most smart phone text-messaging-clients are able to create some contextual threading of "group messages" which narrows the context of the thread around the common interests shared by group members. On the other hand, advanced enterprise messaging applications that push messages from a remote server often display a dynamically changing reply number (multiple numbers used by the same sender), which is used along with the sender's phone number to create session-tracking capabilities analogous to the functionality that cookies provide for web-browsing. As one pervasive example, this technique is used to extend the functionality of many Instant Messenger (IM) applications such that they are able to communicate over two-way dialogues with the much larger SMS user-base. In cases where multiple reply numbers are used by the enterprise server to maintain the dialogue, the visual conversation threading on the client may be separated into multiple threads.

=== Multimedia Messaging Service ===
Multimedia Messaging Service (MMS) is a standard way to send messages that include multimedia content to and from a mobile phone over a cellular network. Users and providers may refer to such a message as a PXT, a picture message, or a multimedia message. The MMS standard extends the core SMS (Short Message Service) capability, allowing the exchange of text messages greater than 160 characters in length. Unlike text-only SMS, MMS can deliver a variety of media, including up to forty seconds of video, one image, a slideshow of multiple images, or audio. The first MMS-capable phones were introduced around 2002 in conjunction with the first GSM network. The Sony Ericsson T68i is widely believed to be the first MMS-capable cell phone, while many more hit North American markets beginning in 2004 and 2005.

The most common use involves sending photographs from camera-equipped handsets. Media companies have utilized MMS on a commercial basis as a method of delivering news and entertainment content, and retailers have deployed it as a tool for delivering scannable coupon codes, product images, videos, and other information.

The 3GPP and WAP groups fostered the development of the MMS standard, which is now continued by the Open Mobile Alliance (OMA).

Content adaptation: Multimedia content created by one brand of MMS phone may not be entirely compatible with the capabilities of the recipient's MMS phone. In the MMS architecture, the recipient MMSC is responsible for providing for content adaptation (e.g., image resizing, audio codec transcoding, etc.), if this feature is enabled by the mobile network operator. When content adaptation is supported by a network operator, its MMS subscribers enjoy compatibility with a larger network of MMS users than would otherwise be available.

=== Rich Communication Services ===
Rich Communication Services (RCS) is a communication protocol standard for instant messaging, primarily for mobile phones, developed and defined by the GSM Association (GSMA). It is a replacement of SMS and MMS on cellular networks with more modern features including high resolution image and video support, typing indicators, file sharing, and improved group chat functionality. Development of RCS began in 2007 but early versions lacked features and interoperability; a new specification named Universal Profile was developed and has been continually rolled out since 2017.

RCS has been designed as an industry open standard to provide improved capabilities over basic text messaging, based on the Internet Protocol (IP). Its development has also been supported by mobile network operators to remain relevant in customer experience in response to over-the-top (OTT) chat apps and services. Additional features of RCS include presence information, location and multimedia sharing, video calling, and operation over mobile data or Wi-Fi, natively integrated in mobile phones without requiring the download of third-party apps.

As of 2020, RCS had rolled out across 90 cell operators in 60 countries globally, and had an estimated 2.5 billion monthly active users as of 2024. The Google Guest program provides person-to-person (P2P) RCS in Google Messages on Android when a carrier does not provide RCS, provided via the Google Jibe backend. Alternatively, RCS service may be provided by a carrier directly; by 2025, carrier partnerships with Google Jibe for direct service have become common. Providing direct RCS service allows for support of additional clients such as Apple Messages, and enables carriers to make the additional choice of providing RCS Business Messages (RBM). Google Messages was the first client to offer end-to-end encryption (E2EE) over RCS. E2EE using Messaging Layer Security (MLS) was added to the RCS standard in March 2025. As of May 2026, the GSMA standard for E2EE is in rollout for Google Messages and Apple Messages. Apple added support for RCS in Messages with iOS 18 in September 2024; RCS is also accessible through desktops via the web client of Google Messages or via Microsoft Phone Link.

=== Internet Relay Chat ===
Internet Relay Chat (IRC) is an application layer protocol that facilitates communication in the form of text. The chat process works on a client/server networking model. IRC clients are computer programs that users can install on their system or web based applications running either locally in the browser or on a third party server. These clients communicate with chat servers to transfer messages to other clients. IRC is mainly designed for group communication in discussion forums, called channels, but also allows one-on-one communication via private messages as well as chat and data transfer, including file sharing.

Client software is available for every major operating system that supports Internet access. As of April 2011, the top 100 IRC networks served more than half a million users at a time, with hundreds of thousands of channels operating on a total of roughly 1,500 servers out of roughly 3,200 servers worldwide. IRC usage has been declining steadily since 2003, losing 60% of its users (from 1 million to about 400,000 in 2012) and half of its channels (from half a million in 2003).

==== Modern IRC ====
IRC has changed much over its life on the Internet. New server software has added a multitude of new features.

- Services: Network-operated bots to facilitate registration of nicknames and channels, sending messages for offline users and network operator functions.
- Extra modes: While the original IRC system used a set of standard user and channel modes, new servers add many new modes for features such as removing color codes from text, or obscuring a user's hostmask ("cloaking") to protect from denial-of-service attacks.
- Proxy detection: Most modern servers support detection of users attempting to connect through an insecure (misconfigured or exploited) proxy server, which can then be denied a connection. This proxy detection software is used by several networks, although that real-time list of proxies is defunct since early 2006.
- Additional commands: New commands can be such things as shorthand commands to issue commands to Services, to network-operator-only commands to manipulate a user's hostmask.
- Encryption: For the client-to-server leg of the connection TLS might be used (messages cease to be secure once they are relayed to other users on standard connections, but it makes eavesdropping on or wiretapping an individual's IRC sessions difficult). For client-to-client communication, SDCC (Secure DCC) can be used.
- Connection protocol: IRC can be connected to via IPv4, the old version of the Internet Protocol, or by IPv6, the current standard of the protocol.

As of 2016, a new standardization effort is under way under a working group called IRCv3, which focuses on more advanced client features like instant notifications, better history support and improved security. As of 2019, no major IRC networks have fully adopted the proposed standard.

After its golden era during the 1990s and early 2000s (240,000 users on QuakeNet in 2004), IRC has seen a significant decline, losing around 60% of users between 2003 and 2012, with users moving to newer social media platforms like Facebook or Twitter, but also to open platforms like XMPP which was developed in 1999. Certain networks like Freenode have experienced surges in popularity during the 2010s that as much as quadrupled their userbase, though all such phenomena ultimately proved temporary. As of 2025, Libera Chat is the largest IRC network in operation, averaging more than 31,000 simultaneous daily users.

The largest IRC networks have traditionally been grouped as the "Big Four"—a designation for networks that top the statistics. The Big Four networks change periodically, but due to the community nature of IRC there are a large number of other networks for users to choose from.

Historically the "Big Four" were:

- EFnet
- IRCnet
- Undernet
- DALnet

IRC reached 6 million simultaneous users in 2001 and 10 million users in 2003, dropping to 371k in 2018. As of December 2025, the 100 largest IRC networks average 214,382 simultaneous users collectively during peak hours. The ten largest of those are:

Top 10 IRC networks by simultaneous users (2026)
Network	Est.	Average users	Average channels	Peak sim. users
Libera Chat	2021	32,065	21,693	51,522 (2023)
Undernet	1993	14,220	5,516	159,171 (2004)
IRCnet	1996	12,611	7,519	136,110 (2005)
OFTC	2001	18,528	4,174	31,756 (2024)
HybridIRC	2018	16,797	466	18,912 (2026)
hackint	2007	10,691	2,062	15,248 (2025)
Rizon	2002	9,597	6,723	49,417 (2004)
EFnet	1990	8,584	5,637	141,541 (2003)
FreeUniBG	1998	8,959	646	11,051 (2026)
DALnet	1994	6,654	3,395	135,630 (2002)

=== XMPP ===
Extensible Messaging and Presence Protocol (XMPP) is a communication protocol for message-oriented middleware based on XML (Extensible Markup Language). It enables the near-real-time exchange of structured yet extensible data between any two or more network entities. Originally named Jabber, the protocol was developed by the eponymous open-source community in 1999 for near real-time instant messaging (IM), presence information, and contact list maintenance. Designed to be extensible, the protocol has been used also for publish-subscribe systems, signalling for VoIP, video, file transfer, gaming, the Internet of Things (IoT) applications such as the smart grid, and social networking services.

Unlike most instant messaging protocols, XMPP is defined in an open standard and uses an open systems approach of development and application, by which anyone may implement an XMPP service and interoperate with other organizations' implementations. Because XMPP is an open protocol, implementations can be developed using any software license and many server, client, and library implementations are distributed as free and open-source software. Numerous freeware and commercial software implementations also exist.

The Internet Engineering Task Force (IETF) formed an XMPP working group in 2002 to formalize the core protocols as an IETF instant messaging and presence technology. The XMPP Working group produced four specifications (RFC 3920, RFC 3921, RFC 3922, RFC 3923), which were approved as Proposed Standards in 2004. In 2011, RFC 3920 and RFC 3921 were superseded by RFC 6120 and RFC 6121 respectively, with RFC 6122 specifying the XMPP address format. In 2015, RFC 6122 was superseded by RFC 7622. In addition to these core protocols standardized at the IETF, the XMPP Standards Foundation (formerly the Jabber Software Foundation) is active in developing open XMPP extensions.

XMPP-based software is deployed widely across the Internet, and by 2003, was used by over ten million people worldwide, according to the XMPP Standards Foundation.

== SMS texting apps ==
Below are apps that are used for texting via SMS. Generally, these apps offer various features for expanded messaging, or group texts; however, all messages are received by others as regular SMS text messages.

=== Textfree ===
Textfree (formerly Pinger) is an application made by Pinger that allows users to text and call over the internet for free or for a price. The application runs on iOS, Android, Microsoft Windows and Macintosh devices. Competitors include GOGII, Optini and WhatsApp.

== Stand-alone messaging platforms ==
Below are stand-alone apps that are generally focused upon instant messaging as their core feature; however, almost all of these also include numerous distinct additional features such as group chats, video calls, emojis, etc.

These apps do not use SMS messaging; rather, users of this app receive messages through the app interface, not through SMS texting.

=== Dingtone ===
Dingtone is an application made by Dingtone that allows users to text and call over the internet for free or for a price. The application runs on Android, IOS, Microsoft Windows and Macintosh devices.

=== Google Voice ===
Google Voice is a telephone service that provides call forwarding and voicemail services, voice and text messaging.

Google Voice provides a U.S. telephone number, chosen by the user from available numbers in selected area codes, free of charge to each user account. Calls to this number are forwarded to telephone numbers that each user must configure in the account web portal. Multiple destinations may be specified that ring simultaneously for incoming calls. Service establishment requires a United States telephone number. A user may answer and receive calls on any of the ringing phones as configured in the web portal. During a received call the user may switch between the configured telephones.

Users in the U.S. may place outbound calls to domestic and international destinations. Calls may be initiated from any of the configured telephones, as well as from a mobile device app, or from the account portal. As of August 2011, users in many other countries also may place outbound calls from the web-based application to domestic and international phone numbers.

Many other Google Voice services—such as voicemail, free text messaging, call history, call screening, blocking of unwanted calls, and voice transcription to text of voicemail messages—are also available to U.S. residents. In terms of product integration, transcribed and audio voicemails, missed call notifications, and/or text messages can optionally be forwarded to an email account of the user's choice. Additionally, text messages can be sent and received via the familiar email or IM interface by reading and writing text messages in numbers in Google Talk respectively (PC-to-Phone texting). Google Voice multi-way videoconferencing (with support for document sharing) is now integrated with Google Hangouts.

The service is configured and maintained by the user in a web-based application, styled after Google's e-mail service, Gmail, or with Android and iOS apps on smart phones or tablets. Google Voice currently provides free PC-to-phone calling within the United States and Canada, and PC-to-PC voice and video calling worldwide between users of the Google+ Hangouts browser plugin (available for Windows, Intel-based Mac OS X, and Linux).

=== GroupMe ===
GroupMe works by downloading the app or accessing the service online, and then forming an account by providing your name, cell phone number and a password, or you can connect through your Facebook or Twitter account. The service then syncs with your contacts and from that point forward the user can make groups, limited to 500 members. An individual who is part of an active group has the ability to turn off notifications for the app; users will still receive the message, but will not be notified about it. Each group is given a label and assigned a unique number. Some of the features of the app include the ability to share photos, videos, locations, create events, and emojis from various packs.

GroupMe has a web client as well as apps for iOS, Android, Windows Phone, and Windows 10. Those who do not wish to use the app can still send and receive GroupMe messages through SMS (only available in the United States). Users begin by creating a "group" and adding contacts. When someone sends a message, everyone in the group can see and respond to it. The app allows users to easily attach and send pictures, documents, videos and web-links as well. Users can also send private messages, but only to users who are also active on the GroupMe app.

GroupMe has been used as a means for studying the usage of messaging clients in educational settings. Use cases include facilitating online course discussions, small group work, and other course communications for both in-person and online sections. Though unconventional, using GroupMe to facilitate discussion in an environment where students already interact has been found to encourage rhetorical thinking and overall engagement. Researchers have found alternatives for literacy learning as a "legitimate academic genre", given a student population that communicates in a variety of modes. Research around GroupMe furthers the argument that computer-mediated communication is a valuable space for learning in an increasingly globalized society.

=== Hike Messenger ===
Hike Messenger, also called Hike Sticker Chat, is an Indian freeware, cross-platform instant messaging (IM), Voice over IP (VoIP) application which was launched on 12 December 2012 by Kavin Bharti Mittal and is now owned by Hike Private Limited. Hike can work offline through SMS and has multi-platform support. The app registration uses standard one time password (OTP) based authentication process. With abundance of low-cost data, Hike decided to go from a single super app strategy to multiple app approach, so that it can focus more on the core messaging capabilities. It has numerous Hikemoji Stickers which can be customized accordingly.From version 6, the user-interface was revised and the app no longer supports features like news, mobile payment, games or jokes. As per CB Insights, $1.4 billion is the valuation of Hike with more than 100 million registered users until August 2016 and 350 employees working from Bengaluru and Delhi.

=== KakaoTalk ===
KakaoTalk, commonly referred to as "KaTalk" in South Korea, is a free mobile instant messaging application for smartphones with free text and free call features, operated by Kakao Corporation. It was launched on March 18, 2010, and is currently available on iOS, Android, Bada OS, BlackBerry, Windows Phone, Nokia Asha, Windows and macOS.

As of May 2017, KakaoTalk had 220 million registered and 49 million monthly active users. It is available in 15 languages. The app is also used by 93% of smartphone owners in South Korea, where it is the number one messaging app.

In addition to free calls and messages, users can share photos, videos, voice messages, location, URL links as well as contact information. Both one-on-one and group chats are available over Wi-Fi, 3G or LTE, and there are no limits to the number of people on a group chat.

Airlines such as Southwest which allow free WhatsApp in flight also have functionality for KaTalk, even though their literature omits to mention same.

The app automatically synchronizes the user's contact list on their smartphones with the contact list on the app to find friends who are on the service. Users can also search for friends by KakaoTalk ID without having to know their phone numbers. The KakaoTalk service also allows its users to export their messages and save them.

KakaoTalk began as a messenger service but has become a platform for the distribution of various third-party content and apps, including hundreds of games, which users can download and play with their friends through the messaging platform. Through the "Plus Friend" feature, users can follow brands, media and celebrities to receive exclusive messages, coupons and other real-time information through KakaoTalk chatrooms. Users can also purchase real-life goods through the messenger's "Gifting" platform.

Besides those listed above, the app has these additional features:

- VoiceTalk, free calls and conference calls (with support for up to five people)
- Photo, video, location, and contact information sharing
- Polling and scheduling feature for members in the chatroom
- K-pop & Local Star Friends (Plus Friends)
- Walkie-talkie
- Customizable themes (for iOS and Android)
- Game platform
- Stickers and animated emoticons
- Plus Mate: You can add your favorite brand, star, or media as your friend to receive a variety of content and benefits.

=== Kik Messenger ===
Kik Messenger, commonly called Kik, is a freeware instant messaging mobile app from the Canadian company Kik Interactive, available free of charge on iOS and Android operating systems. It uses a smartphone's data plan or Wi-Fi to transmit and receive messages, photos, videos, sketches, mobile web pages, and other content after users register a username. Kik is known for its features preserving users' anonymity, such as allowing users to register without the need to provide a telephone number or valid email address. However, the application does not employ end-to-end encryption, and the company also logs user IP addresses, which could be used to determine the user's ISP and approximate location. This information, as well as "reported" conversations are regularly surrendered upon request by law enforcement organizations, sometimes without the need for a court order.

Kik was originally intended to be a music-sharing app before transitioning to messaging, briefly offering users the ability to send a limited number of SMS text messages directly from the application. During the first 15 days after Kik's re-release as a messaging app, over 1 million accounts were created. In May 2016, Kik Messenger announced that they had approximately 300 million registered users, and was used by approximately 40% of United States' teenagers.

Kik Messenger announced in October 2019 they had signed a letter of intent with MediaLab AI, followed by the announcement Kik Interactive would be reducing their staff from 100 to just 19. MediaLab owns several mobile apps, most notably Whisper.

A main attraction of Kik that differentiates it from other messaging apps is its anonymity. To register for the Kik service, a user must enter a first and last name, e-mail address, and birth date (which must show that the user is at least 13 years old), and select a username. The Kik registration process does not request or require the entry of a phone number (although the user has the option to enter one), unlike some other messaging services that require a user to provide a functioning mobile phone number.

The New York Times has reported that, according to law enforcement, Kik's anonymity features go beyond those of most widely used apps. As of February 2016, Kik's guide for law enforcement said that the company cannot locate user accounts based on first and last name, e-mail address and/or birth date; the exact username is required to locate a particular account. The guide further said that the company does not have access to content or "historical user data" such as photographs, videos, and the text of conversations, and that photographs and videos are automatically deleted shortly after they are sent. A limited amount of data from a particular account (identified by exact username), including first and last name, birth date, e-mail address, link to a current profile picture, device-related information, and user location information such as the most recently used IP address, can be preserved for a period of 90 days pending receipt of a valid order from law enforcement. Kik's anonymity has also been cited as a protective safety measure for good faith users, in that "users have screennames; the app doesn't share phone numbers or email addresses."

Kik introduced several new user features in 2015, including a full-screen in-chat browser that allows users to find and share content from the web; a feature allowing users to send previously recorded videos in Kik Messenger for Android and iOS; and "Kik Codes", which assigns each user a unique code similar to a QR code, making it easier to connect and chat with other users. Kik joined the Virtual Global Taskforce, a global anti-child-abuse organization, in March 2015. Kik began using Microsoft's PhotoDNA in March 2015 to premoderate images added by users. That same month, Kik released native video capture allowing users to record up to 15 seconds in the chat window. In October 2015, Kik partnered with the Ad Council as part of an anti-bullying campaign. The campaign was featured on the app and Kik released stickers in collaboration with the campaign. Kik released a feature to send GIFs as emojis in November 2015. Kik added SafePhoto to its safety features in October 2016 which "detects, reports, and deletes known child exploitation images" sent through the platform. Kik partnered with ConnectSafely in 2016 to produce a "parents handbook" and joined The Technology Coalition, an anti-sexual exploitation group including Facebook, Google, Twitter and LinkedIn.

=== Line ===
Line (styled in all caps as LINE) is a freeware app for instant communications on electronic devices such as smartphones, tablet computers, and personal computers. Line users exchange texts, images, video and audio, and conduct free VoIP conversations and video conferences. In addition, Line is a platform providing various services including digital wallet as Line Pay, news stream as Line Today, video on demand as Line TV, and digital comic distribution as Line Manga and Line Webtoon. The service is operated by Line Corporation, a Tokyo-based subsidiary of South Korean internet search engine company Naver Corporation.

Line is an application that works on multiple platforms and has access via multiple personal computers (Windows or macOS). The application will also give an option of address book syncing. This application also has a feature to add friends through the use of QR codes, by Line ID, and by shaking phones simultaneously. The application has a direct pop-out message box for reading and replying to make it easy for users to communicate. It also can share photos, videos and music with other users, send the current or any specific location, voice audio, emojis, stickers and emoticons to friends. Users can see a real-time confirmation when messages are sent and received or use a hidden chat feature, which can hide and delete a chat history (from both involved devices and Line servers) after a time set by the user. The application also makes free voice and video calls.

Users can also chat and share media in a group by creating and joining groups that have up to 500 people. Chats also provide bulletin boards on which users can post, like, and comment. This application also has timeline and homepage features that allow users to post pictures, text and stickers on their homepages. Users can also change their Line theme to the theme Line provides in the theme shop for free or users can buy other famous cartoon characters they like. Line also has a feature, called a Snap movie, that users can use to record a stop-motion video and add in provided background music.

In January 2015, Line Taxi was released in Tokyo as a competitor to Uber. Line launched a new android app called "Popcorn buzz" in June 2015. The app facilitates group calls with up to 200 members. In June a new Emoji keyboard was also released for iOS devices, which provides a Line-like experience with the possibility to add stickers. In September 2015 a new Android launcher was released on the Play Store, helping the company to promote its own services through the new user interface.

=== Signal ===
Signal is a cross-platform encrypted messaging service developed by the Signal Foundation and Signal Messenger LLC. It uses the Internet to send one-to-one and group messages, which can include files, voice notes, images and videos. It can also be used to make one-to-one voice and video calls, and the Android version can optionally function as an SMS app.

Signal uses standard cellular telephone numbers as identifiers and secures all communications to other Signal users with end-to-end encryption. The apps include mechanisms by which users can independently verify the identity of their contacts and the integrity of the data channel.

=== Snapchat ===
Snapchat sends messages referred to as "snaps"; snaps can consist of a photo or a short video, and can be edited to include filters and effects, text captions, and drawings. Snaps can be directed privately to selected contacts, or to a semi-public "Story" or a public "Story" called "Our Story." The ability to send video snaps was added as a feature option in December 2012. By holding down on the photo button while inside the app, a video of up to ten seconds in length can be captured. Spiegel explained that this process allowed the video data to be compressed into the size of a photo. A later update allowed the ability to record up to 60 seconds, but are still segmented into 10 second intervals. After a single viewing, the video disappears by default. On May 1, 2014, the ability to communicate via video chat was added. Direct messaging features were also included in the update, allowing users to send ephemeral text messages to friends and family while saving any needed information by clicking on it. According to CIO, Snapchat uses real-time marketing concepts and temporality to make the app appealing to users. According to Marketing Pro, Snapchat attracts interest and potential customers by combining the AIDA (marketing) model with modern digital technology.

Private message photo snaps can be viewed for a user-specified length of time (1 to 10 seconds as determined by the sender) before they become inaccessible. Users were previously required to hold down on the screen in order to view a snap; this behavior was removed in July 2015 The requirement to hold on the screen was intended to frustrate the ability to take screenshots of snaps; the Snapchat app does not prevent screenshots from being taken but can notify the sender if it detects that it has been saved. However, these notifications can be bypassed through either unauthorized modifications to the app or by obtaining the image through external means. One snap per day can be replayed for free. In September 2015, Snapchat introduced the option to purchase additional replays through in-app purchases. The ability to purchase extra replays was removed in April 2016.

Friends can be added via usernames and phone contacts, using customizable "Snapcodes," or through the "Add Nearby" function, which scans for users near their location who are also in the Add Nearby menu. Spiegel explained that Snapchat is intended to counteract the trend of users being compelled to manage an idealized online identity of themselves, which he says has "taken all of the fun out of communicating."

=== Tango ===
Tango is a third-party, cross platform messaging application software for smartphones developed by TangoME, Inc. in 2009. The app is free and began as one of the first provider of video calls, voice calls, texting, photo sharing, and games on a 3G network.

As of 2018, Tango has more than 400 million registered users. It was rated by PCMag as "the simplest mobile chat application out there, with a good range of support."

In 2017, Tango entered the live-streaming space, and has become a B2C platform for Live Video Broadcasts. Combining high-quality video streaming, a live messaging chat and a digital economy, Tango is a social community that allows content creators to share their talents and monetize their fans and followers.

Tango is available in many languages including Russian, Spanish, Turkish, Hindi and Vietnamese.

=== Telegram ===
Telegram provides the following features, as detailed below.

- Group threads: up to 200,000 members
- Groups and channels: provides numerous official channels for various organizations. Has an internal search feature to enable searches to find various official outlets.

Telegram is a cross-platform cloud-based instant messaging, video calling, and VoIP service. It was initially launched for iOS on 14 August 2013 in Russia, and is currently based in Dubai. Telegram client apps are available for Android, iOS, Windows Phone, Windows, macOS and Linux, web interface is also available. As of April 2020, Telegram reached 400 million monthly active users.

Telegram provides end-to-end encrypted calls and optional end-to-end encrypted "secret" chats between two online users on smartphone clients, whereas cloud chats use client-server/ server-client encryption. Users can send text and voice messages, animated stickers, make voice and video calls, and share an unlimited number of images, documents(2GB per file), user locations, contacts, music, links etc.

Since March 2017, Telegram introduced its own voice calls. According to Telegram, there is a neural network working to learn various technical parameters about a call to provide better quality of the service for future uses. After a brief initial trial in Western Europe, voice calls are now available for use in most countries.

Telegram announced in April 2020 that they would include group video calls by the end of the year. On 15 August 2020, Telegram added video calling with end-to-end encryption like Signal and WhatsApp, which Zoom does not have yet. Currently offering one-to-one video calls, Telegram has plans to introduce secure group video calls later in 2020. Picture-in-picture mode is also available so that users have the option to simultaneously use the other functions of the app while still remaining on the call and are even able to turn their video off.

Telegram's video and voice calls are secure and end-to-end encrypted.

=== Viber ===
Rakuten Viber, or simply Viber, is a cross-platform voice over IP (VoIP) and instant messaging (IM) software application operated by Japanese multinational company Rakuten, provided as freeware for the Android, iOS, Microsoft Windows, macOS and Linux platforms. Users are registered and identified through a cellular telephone number, although the service is accessible on desktop platforms without needing mobile connectivity. In addition to instant messaging it allows users to exchange media such as images and video records, and also provides a paid international landline and mobile calling service called Viber Out. As of 2018, there are over a billion registered users on the network.

=== WeChat ===
WeChat is a Chinese multi-purpose messaging, social media and mobile payment app developed by Tencent. First released in 2011, it became the world's largest standalone mobile app in 2018, with over 1 billion monthly active users. WeChat has been described as China's "app for everything" and a "super app" because of its wide range of functions. WeChat provides text messaging, hold-to-talk voice messaging, broadcast (one-to-many) messaging, video conferencing, video games, sharing of photographs and videos, and location sharing.

WeChat provides text messaging, hold-to-talk voice messaging, broadcast (one-to-many) messaging, video calls and conferencing, video games, photograph and video sharing, as well as location sharing. WeChat also allows users to exchange contacts with people nearby via Bluetooth, as well as providing various features for contacting people at random if desired (if people are open to it). It can also integrate with other social networking services such as Facebook and Tencent QQ. Photographs may also be embellished with filters and captions, and automatic translation service is available.

WeChat supports different instant messaging methods, including text message, voice message, walkie talkie, and stickers. Users can send previously saved or live pictures and videos, profiles of other users, coupons, lucky money packages, or current GPS locations with friends either individually or in a group chat. WeChat's character stickers, such as Tuzki, resemble and compete with those of LINE, a Japanese-South Korean messaging application.

WeChat users can register as a public account (公众号), which enables them to push feeds to subscribers, interact with subscribers and provide them with services. Users can also create an official account, which fall under service, subscription, or enterprise accounts. Once users as individuals or organizations set up a type of account, they cannot change it to another type. By the end of 2014, the number of WeChat official accounts had reached 8 million. Official accounts of organizations can apply to be verified (cost 300 RMB or about US$45). Official accounts can be used as a platform for services such as hospital pre-registrations, visa renewal or credit card service. To create an official account, the applicant must register with Chinese authorities, which discourages "foreign companies".

"Moments" (朋友圈) is WeChat's brand name for its social feed of friends' updates. "Moments" is an interactive platform that allows users to post images, text, and short videos taken by users. It also allows users to share articles and music (associated with QQ Music or other web-based music services). Friends in the contact list can give thumbs up to the content and leave comments. Moments can be linked to Facebook and Twitter accounts, and can automatically post Moments content directly on these two platforms.

In 2017 WeChat had a policy of a maximum of two advertisements per day per Moments user.

=== WhatsApp ===
WhatsApp provides the following features, as detailed below.

- Group threads: up to 250 members
- Groups and channels: no built-in search function to find official groups and channels. anyone can join groups, if they have the link.
- Video calls: up to 3 members.

WhatsApp is an American freeware, cross-platform messaging and Voice over IP (VoIP) service owned by Facebook, Inc. It allows users to send text messages and voice messages, make voice and video calls, and share images, documents, user locations, and other media. WhatsApp's client application runs on mobile devices but is also accessible from desktop computers, as long as the user's mobile device remains connected to the Internet while they use the desktop app. The service requires users to provide a standard cellular mobile number for registering with the service. In January 2018, WhatsApp released a standalone business app targeted at small business owners, called WhatsApp Business, to allow companies to communicate with customers who use the standard WhatsApp client.

The client application was created by WhatsApp Inc. of Mountain View, California, which was acquired by Facebook in February 2014 for approximately US$19.3 billion. It became the world's most popular messaging application by 2015, and has over 2 billion users worldwide as of February 2020. It has become the primary means of electronic communication in multiple countries and locations, including Latin America, the Indian subcontinent, and large parts of Europe and Africa.

=== Wonder video chat ===
Wonder is a new style of shared video chat, using a virtual space where users can move between virtual rooms and initiate conversations either with a large group, or within a spontaneous "circle." The chat platforms is entirely browser-based, and does not entail or require the use of any specific app.

== Platforms for combining multiple apps ==
Platforms specifically designed to combined messages from multiple other mobile apps.

=== Trillian ===
Trillian is a proprietary multiprotocol instant messaging application created by Cerulean Studios. It is currently available for Microsoft Windows, Mac OS X, Linux, Android, iOS, BlackBerry OS, and the Web. It can connect to multiple IM services, such as AIM, Bonjour, Facebook Messenger, Google Talk (Hangouts), IRC, XMPP (Jabber), VZ, and Yahoo! Messenger networks; as well as social networking sites, such as Facebook, Foursquare, LinkedIn, and Twitter; and email services, such as POP3 and IMAP.

Trillian no longer supports Windows Live Messenger or Skype as these services have combined and Microsoft chose to discontinue Skypekit. They also no longer support connecting to Myspace, and no longer support a distinct connection for Gmail, Hotmail or Yahoo! Mail although these can still be connected to via POP3 or IMAP. Currently, Trillian supports Facebook, Google, Jabber (XMPP), and Olark.

Initially released July 1, 2000, as a freeware IRC client, the first commercial version (Trillian Pro 1.0) was published on September 10, 2002. The program was named after Trillian, a fictional character in The Hitchhiker's Guide to the Galaxy by Douglas Adams. A previous version of the official web site even had a tribute to Douglas Adams on its front page. On August 14, 2009, Trillian "Astra" (4.0) for Windows was released, along with its own Astra network. Trillian 5 for Windows was released in May 2011, and Trillian 6.0 was initially released in February 2017.

Trillian connects to multiple instant messaging services without the need of running multiple clients. Users can create multiple connections to the same service, and can also group connections under separate identities to prevent confusion. All contacts are gathered under the same contact list. Contacts are not bound to their own IM service groups, and can be dragged and dropped freely.

Trillian represents each service with a different-colored sphere. Prior versions used the corporate logos for each service, but these were removed to avoid copyright issues, although some skins still use the original icons. The Trillian designers chose a color-coding scheme based on the underground maps used by the London Underground that uses different colors to differentiate between different lines.

== Platforms for specific operating systems ==
=== Empathy ===
Empathy is an instant messaging (IM) and voice over IP (VoIP) client which supports text, voice, video, file transfers, and inter-application communication over various IM communication protocols. It is specifically designed for use with the operating systems BSD, Linux, and other Unix-like systems. It was initially completely XMPP based (similar to Google Talk and Facebook's chat implementations), but others wanted it to use the Telepathy stack. This led to the forking and new name Empathy.

Empathy also provides a collection of reusable graphical user interface widgets for developing instant messaging clients for the GNOME desktop. It is written as extension to the Telepathy framework, for connecting to different instant messaging networks with a unified user interface.

Empathy has been included in the GNOME desktop since its version 2.24, in Ubuntu since version 9.10 (Karmic Koala), and in Fedora since version 12 (Constantine); Empathy has replaced Pidgin as their default messenger application.

=== Messages for MacOS ===
Messages (Apple) is an instant messaging software application developed by Apple Inc. for its macOS, iOS, iPadOS, and watchOS operating systems.

The mobile version of Messages on iOS used on iPhone and iPad also supports SMS and MMS due to replacing the older text messaging Text app since iPhone OS 3. Users can tell the difference between a message sent via SMS and one sent over iMessage as the bubbles will appear either green (SMS) or blue (iMessage).

The desktop Messages application replaced iChat as the native OS X instant messaging client with the release of OS X Mountain Lion in July 2012. While it inherits the majority of iChat's features, Messages also brings support for iMessage, Apple's messaging service for iOS, as well as FaceTime integration.

Messages was announced for OS X as a beta application on February 16, 2012 for Macs running Mac OS X 10.7 "Lion". The stable release of Messages was released on July 25, 2012 with OS X Mountain Lion, replacing iChat. In addition to supporting Apple's new iMessage protocol, Messages retained its support for AIM, Yahoo! Messenger, Google Talk and Jabber.

Messages unitizes the newly added Notification Center to notify of incoming messages. The introduction of a new Share button in applications like Safari, Finder and Preview gave users the ability to share links to webpages, photos, and files. Messages also supported dragging and dropping files and photos for sharing. It also supports video calling through Apple's FaceTime and the third-party IM services it supports. With the release of OS X Mountain Lion 10.8.2, Messages gained the ability to send and receive iMessages using an iPhone phone number.

Messages received a major redesign in OS X Yosemite, following the flat design aesthetic introduced in iOS 7. As a part of the new Continuity feature, users can send and receive SMS and MMS messages through paired iPhones running iOS 8 or later.

== Social networking mobile apps ==
A social networking service (also social networking site or social media) is an online platform which people use to build social networks or social relationships with other people who share similar personal or career interests, activities, backgrounds or real-life connections.

Social networking services vary in format and the number of features. They can incorporate a range of new information and communication tools, operating on desktops and on laptops, on mobile devices such as tablet computers and smartphones. They may feature digital photo/video/sharing and diary entries online (blogging). Online community services are sometimes considered social-network services by developers and users, though in a broader sense, a social-network service usually provides an individual-centered service whereas online community services are group-centered. Defined as "websites that facilitate the building of a network of contacts in order to exchange various types of content online," social networking sites provide a space for interaction to continue beyond in person interactions. These computer mediated interactions link members of various networks and may help to both maintain and develop new social and professional relationships

Social networking sites allow users to share ideas, digital photos and videos, posts, and to inform others about online or real-world activities and events with people in their network. While in-person social networking – such as gathering in a village market to talk about events – has existed since the earliest development of towns, the web enables people to connect with others who live in different locations, ranging from across a city to across the world. Depending on the social media platform, members may be able to contact any other member. In other cases, members can contact anyone they have a connection to, and subsequently anyone that contact has a connection to, and so on. The success of social networking services can be seen in their dominance in society today, with Facebook having a massive 2.13 billion active monthly users and an average of 1.4 billion daily active users in 2017. LinkedIn, a career-oriented social-networking service, generally requires that a member personally know another member in real life before they contact them online. Some services require members to have a preexisting connection to contact other members.

=== MeWe ===
MeWe is an American alt-tech social media and social networking service owned by Sgrouples, a company based in Culver City, California. MeWe's light approach to content moderation has made it popular among conspiracy theorists, particularly the anti-vaccine movement, as well as American conservatives. The site's interface has been described as similar to that of Facebook, though the company describes MeWe as the "anti-Facebook" due to its focus on data privacy

By 2015, as MeWe neared the end of its beta testing cycle, the press called MeWe's software "not dissimilar to Facebook". Mashable described MeWe as replicating Facebook's features in 2020.

The MeWe site and application has features common to most social media and social networking sites: users can post text and images to a feed, react to others' posts using emoji, post animated GIFs, create specialized groups, post disappearing content, and chat.

Online chat may occur between two or more people or among members of a group. Person-to-person online chat is similar to that in most other social media and social networking sites, and supports text, video calling, and voice calling. "Secret Chat" is limited to the paid subscription tier of MeWe, and uses double ratchet encryption to ensure that chats are private and not visible even to MeWe employees.

MeWe reported in June 2018 that the site had 90,000 active groups, 60,000 of which were "public" and open to all users. Following the influx of Hong Kong users in 2020, MeWe CEO Weinstein announced that the website would provide a Traditional Chinese language version by the end of the year.

==== User base and content ====
Although MeWe has not intentionally positioned itself as a social network for conservatives, Mashable noted in November 2020 that its active userbase trends conservative.The platform's choice not to moderate misinformation on the platform has attracted conservatives who felt mainstream social networks were censoring their posts, and those who have been banned from those platforms.

=== MeetMe ===
The Meet Group (formerly MeetMe) owns several mobile social networking services including MeetMe, hi5, LOVOO, Growlr, Skout, and Tagged.

The company has millions of mobile daily active users. Its mobile apps are available on iOS, and Android in multiple languages. Through these apps, users can stream live video, send gifts, chat, and share photos. The Meet Group derives revenue from in-app purchases, subscriptions, and advertising. The company has offices in New Hope, Pennsylvania, Philadelphia, San Francisco, Dresden, and Berlin.

The Meet Group has transformed its business from being a predominantly advertising model to now generating the majority of revenue from user pay sources, which include subscriptions and in-app purchases for virtual gifts as part of its video live-streaming product. The company also derives revenue from advertising. In the second quarter of 2018, 60% of revenue was derived from user-pay, versus 26% in the second quarter of 2017. Livestreaming video revenue has become an increasingly important component of revenue and growth, and the product has been rolled out to all of the company's main apps.

myYearbook derives its revenue from three sources: advertising, virtual-currency sales, and monthly subscriptions. Advertising makes up two-thirds of its revenue, with the other sources making up the rest. It has an established sales office based in New York City and Los Angeles.

=== Nextdoor ===
Nextdoor is a hyperlocal social networking service for neighborhoods. The company was founded in 2008 and is based in San Francisco, California. Nextdoor launched in the United States in October 2011, and is currently available in 11 countries. Users of Nextdoor are required to submit their real names and addresses (or street without the exact number) to the website; posts made to the website are available only to other Nextdoor members living in the same neighborhood.

Typical platform uses include neighbors reporting on news and events in their "neighborhood" and members asking each other for local service-provider recommendations. "Neighborhood" borders were initially established with Maponics, a provider of geographical information. According to the platform's rules, members whose addresses fall outside the boundaries of existing neighborhoods can establish their own neighborhoods. "Founding" members of neighborhoods determine the name of the neighborhood and its boundaries, although Nextdoor retains the authority to change either of these. A member must attract a minimum of 10 households to establish a new "neighborhood", as of November 2016.

While allowing for "civil debate", the platform prohibits canvassing for votes on forums. The service does however allow separate forums just for political discussions. According to The New York Times, these discussions are "separated from [a user's regular] neighborhood feeds". The company had established these separate forums in 12 markets by 2018. The company has stated it "has no plans" to accept political advertising.

== Special-use platforms ==
=== U-Report ===
U-Report is a social messaging tool and data collection system developed by UNICEF to improve citizen engagement, inform leaders, and foster positive change. The program sends SMS polls and alerts to its participants, collecting real-time responses, and subsequently publishes gathered data. Issues polled include health, education, water, sanitation and hygiene, youth unemployment, HIV/AIDS, and disease outbreaks. The program currently has three million participants in forty-one countries.

== Platforms that are internal features within major websites ==
=== Facebook ===
Facebook Messenger is an instant messaging service and software application. It began as Facebook Chat in 2008, was revamped in 2010 and eventually became a standalone mobile app in August 2011, while remaining part of the user page on browsers.

Complementing regular conversations, Messenger lets users make one-to-one and group voice and video calls. Its Android app has integrated support for SMS and "Chat Heads", which are round profile photo icons appearing on-screen regardless of what app is open, while both apps support multiple accounts, conversations with optional end-to-end encryption and "Instant Games". Some features, including sending money and requesting transportation, are limited to the United States. In 2017, Facebook added "Messenger Day", a feature that lets users share photos and videos in a story-format with all their friends with the content disappearing after 24 hours; Reactions, which lets users tap and hold a message to add a reaction through an emoji; and Mentions, which lets users in group conversations type @ to give a particular user a notification.

Businesses and users can interact through Messenger with features such as tracking purchases and receiving notifications, and interacting with customer service representatives. Third-party developers can integrate apps into Messenger, letting users enter an app while inside Messenger and optionally share details from the app into a chat. Developers can build chatbots into Messenger, for uses such as news publishers building bots to distribute news. The M virtual assistant (U.S.) scans chats for keywords and suggests relevant actions, such as its payments system for users mentioning money. Group chatbots appear in Messenger as "Chat Extensions". A "Discovery" tab allows finding bots, and enabling special, branded QR codes that, when scanned, take the user to a specific bot.

=== Instagram ===
In December 2013, Instagram announced Instagram Direct, a feature that lets users interact through private messaging. Users who follow each other can send private messages with photos and videos, in contrast to the public-only requirement that was previously in place. When users receive a private message from someone they don't follow, the message is marked as pending and the user must accept to see it. Users can send a photo to a maximum of 15 people. The feature received a major update in September 2015, adding conversation threading and making it possible for users to share locations, hashtag pages, and profiles through private messages directly from the news feed. Additionally, users can now reply to private messages with text, emoji or by clicking on a heart icon. A camera inside Direct lets users take a photo and send it to the recipient without leaving the conversation. A new update in November 2016 let users make their private messages "disappear" after being viewed by the recipient, with the sender receiving a notification if the recipient takes a screenshot.

In April 2017, Instagram redesigned Direct to combine all private messages, both permanent and ephemeral, into the same message threads. In May, Instagram made it possible to send website links in messages, and also added support for sending photos in their original portrait or landscape orientation without cropping.

In April 2020, Direct became accessible from the Instagram website.

In August 2020, Facebook started merging Instagram Direct into Facebook Messenger. After the update (which is rolled out to a segment of the user base) the Instagram Direct icon transforms into Facebook Messenger icon.

=== LinkedIn ===
The LinkedIn website includes a feature that allows direct messaging by a user to any other user who is on their list of Connections. Additionally, users with Premium membership can send messages to anyone on LinkedIn.

=== Reddit ===
In 2017, Reddit developed its own real-time chat software for the site. While some established subreddits have used third-party software to chat about their communities, the company built chat functions that it hopes will become an integral part of Reddit. Individual chat rooms were rolled out in 2017 and community chat rooms for members of a given subreddit were rolled out in 2018.

=== Twitter ===
Tweets are publicly visible by default, but senders can restrict message delivery to only their followers. Users can mute users they do not wish to interact with and block accounts from viewing their tweets. Users can tweet via the Twitter website, compatible external applications (such as for smartphones), or by Short Message Service (SMS) available in certain countries. Users may subscribe to other users' tweets—this is known as "following" and subscribers are known as "followers" or "tweeps", a portmanteau of Twitter and peeps. Individual tweets can be forwarded by other users to their own feed, a process known as a "retweet". Users can also "like" (formerly "favorite") individual tweets. Twitter allows users to update their profile via their mobile phone either by text messaging or by apps released for certain smartphones and tablets. Twitter has been compared to a web-based Internet Relay Chat (IRC) client. In a 2009 Time magazine essay, technology author Steven Johnson described the basic mechanics of Twitter as "remarkably simple":

As a social network, Twitter revolves around the principle of followers. When you choose to follow another Twitter user, that user's tweets appear in reverse chronological order on your main Twitter page. If you follow 20 people, you'll see a mix of tweets scrolling down the page: breakfast-cereal updates, interesting new links, music recommendations, even musings on the future of education.

== Video conference platforms ==
=== Jitsi ===
Jitsi is a collection of free and open-source multiplatform voice (VoIP), video conferencing and instant messaging applications for the web platform, Windows, Linux, macOS, iOS and Android. The Jitsi project began with the Jitsi Desktop (previously known as SIP Communicator). It is totally free to use, and to host on a business's own server.

With the growth of WebRTC, the project team focus shifted to the Jitsi Videobridge for allowing web-based multi-party video calling. Later the team added Jitsi Meet, a full video conferencing application that includes web, Android, and iOS clients. Jitsi also operates meet.jit.si, a version of Jitsi Meet hosted by Jitsi for free community use. Other projects include: Jigasi, lib-jitsi-meet, Jidesha, and Jitsi.

Jitsi has received support from various institutions such as the NLnet Foundation, the University of Strasbourg and the Region of Alsace and it has also had multiple participations in the Google Summer of Code program.

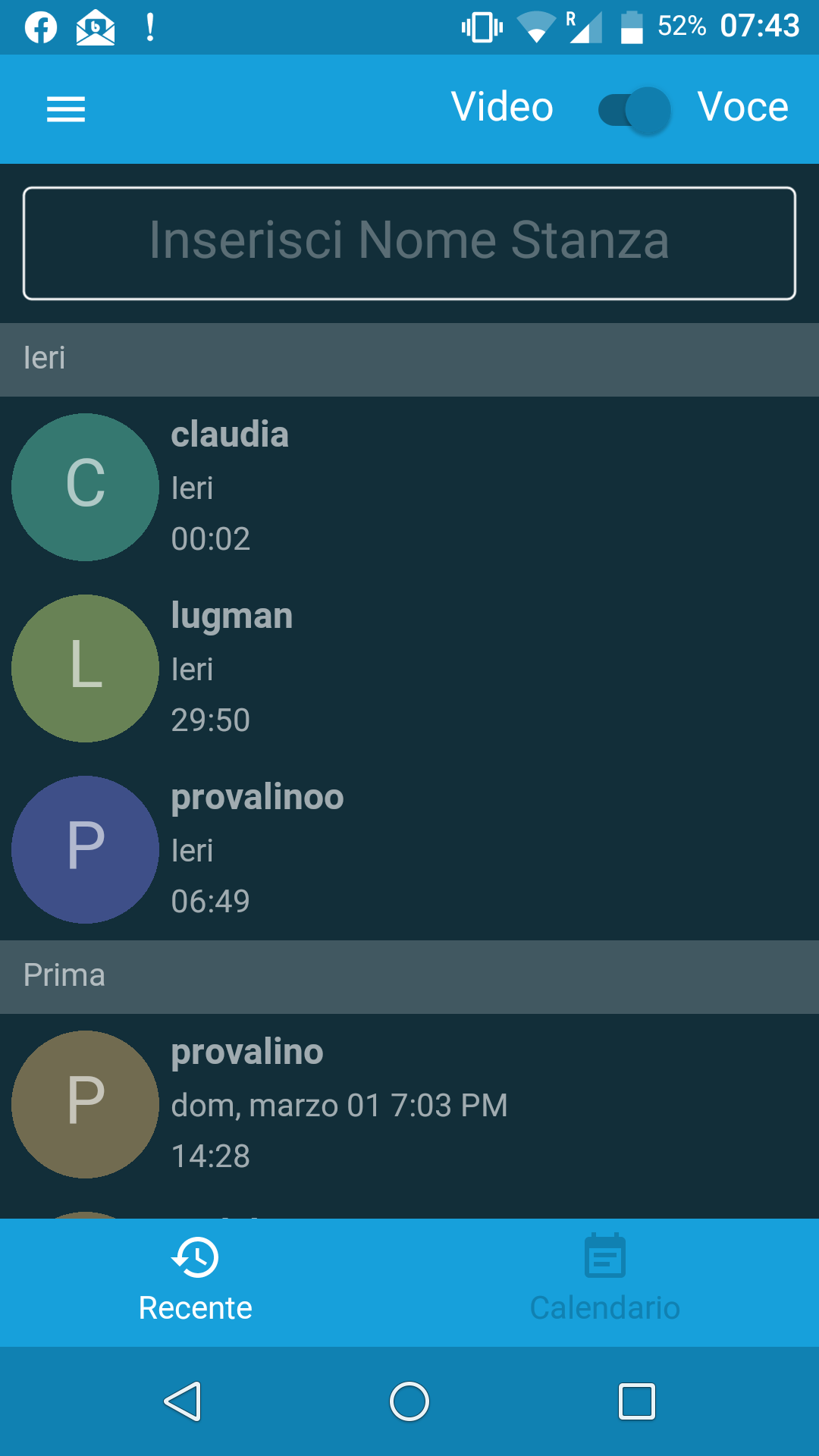
Jitsi Meet Android application

Jitsi Meet is an open source JavaScript WebRTC application used primarily for video conferencing. In addition to audio and video, screen sharing is available, and new members can be invited via a generated link. The interface is accessible via web browser or with a mobile app. The Jitsi Meet server software can be downloaded and installed on Linux-based computers. Jitsi owner 8x8 maintains a free public-use server for up to 50 participants at meet.jit.si.

Key features of Jitsi Meet

- Encrypted communication (secure communication): As of April 2020, one-to-one calls use the P2P mode, which is end-to-end encrypted via DTLS-SRTP between the two participants. Group calls also use DTLS-SRTP encryption, but rely on the Jitsi Videobridge (JVB) as video router, where packets are decrypted temporarily. The Jitsi team emphasizes that "they are never stored to any persistent storage and only live in memory while being routed to other participants in the meeting", and that this measure is necessary due to current limitations of the underlying WebRTC technology.
- No need of new client software installation.

=== Skype ===
Skype is a proprietary telecommunications application that specializes in providing video chat and voice calls between computers, tablets, mobile devices, the Xbox One console, and smartwatches over the Internet. Skype also provides instant messaging services. Users may transmit text, video, audio and images. Skype allows video conference calls.

In March 2020, Skype was used by 100 million people on a monthly basis and by 40 million people on a daily basis, which was a 70% increase in the number of daily users from the previous month, due to the COVID-19 pandemic. Registered users of Skype are identified by a unique Skype ID and may be listed in the Skype directory under a Skype username. Skype allows these registered users to communicate through both instant messaging and voice chat. Voice chat allows telephone calls between pairs of users and conference calling and uses proprietary audio codec. Skype's text chat client allows group chats, emoticons, storing chat history, and editing of previous messages. Offline messages were implemented in a beta build of version 5 but removed after a few weeks without notification. The usual features familiar to instant messaging users—user profiles, online status indicators, and so on—are also included.

The Online Number, a.k.a. SkypeIn, service allows Skype users to receive calls on their computers dialed by conventional phone subscribers to a local Skype phone number; local numbers are available for Australia, Belgium, Brazil, Chile, Colombia, Denmark, the Dominican Republic, Estonia, Finland, France, Germany, Hong Kong, Hungary, India, Ireland, Japan, Mexico, Nepal, New Zealand, Poland, Romania, South Africa, South Korea, Sweden, Switzerland, Turkey, the Netherlands, the United Kingdom, and the United States. A Skype user can have local numbers in any of these countries, with calls to the number charged at the same rate as calls to fixed lines in the country.

Skype supports conference calls, video chats, and screen sharing between 25 people at a time for free, which then increased to 50 on 5 April 2019.

Skype does not provide the ability to call emergency numbers, such as 112 in Europe, 911 in North America, 999 in the UK or 100 in India and Nepal. However, as of December 2012, there is limited support for emergency calls in the United Kingdom, Australia, Denmark, and Finland. The U.S. Federal Communications Commission (FCC) has ruled that, for the purposes of section 255 of the Telecommunications Act, Skype is not an "interconnected VoIP provider". As a result, the U.S. National Emergency Number Association recommends that all VoIP users have an analog line available as a backup.

Skype allows users to send instant messages to other users in their contact list. Messages sent to offline users are stored on Skype servers and will be delivered to their recipients as soon as they come online on Skype. Chat history along with the message status will be synchronized across all user devices supported by Skype whenever the user signs in with the same Skype account.

Although Skype allows sending SMS messages, it is not possible to receive SMS messages on Skype so users need a different way to receive responses to the messages they send using Skype. This has been a cause of angst among user who purchase Skype as an alternative to a mobile phone because Microsoft will not refund any purchases even for users who discover this missing feature only after purchasing multi-year contracts. Other than in user complaints on the Microsoft Skype forums, there is no mention on Microsoft or Skype websites that when they say "Send SMS messages," that is just what they mean: users can send but they cannot receive SMS messages.

Skype keeps user instant messaging history on user's local computer, and on Skype's cloud for 30 days. Users cannot control how long their chat histories are stored on Skype's servers but can configure that option individually for every their device. Once user signs into Skype on a new device the conversation history is synced with Skype's cloud and stored locally. Skype allows users to remove or edit individual messages during one hour after sending; this affects messages already received by chat interlocutors as well as not delivered to them yet. Skype allows users to delete all saved conversation histories for the device.

=== FaceTime ===
FaceTime is a proprietary videotelephony product developed by Apple Inc. It is available on supported iOS mobile devices running iOS 4 and later and Mac computers that run Mac OS X 10.6.6 and later. FaceTime supports any iOS device with a forward-facing camera and any Mac computer equipped with a FaceTime Camera. FaceTime Audio, an audio-only version, is available on any iOS device that supports iOS 7 or newer, and any Mac with a forward-facing camera running Mac OS X 10.9.2 and later. FaceTime is included for free in iOS and in macOS from Mac OS X Lion (10.7) onwards.

Apple bought the "FaceTime" name from FaceTime Communications, which changed its name to Actiance in January 2011. On June 7, 2010, Apple CEO Steve Jobs announced FaceTime in conjunction with the iPhone 4 in a keynote speech at the 2010 Apple Worldwide Developers Conference. Support for the fourth generation iPod Touch (the first model of iPod Touch equipped with cameras) was announced in conjunction with the device's release on September 8, 2010. FaceTime for Mac OS X was announced on October 20, 2010.

In May 2011, it was found that FaceTime would work seamlessly over 3G on all iPhone, iPad, and iPod Touch models that supported it. Even though FaceTime worked only over 3G at that time, it now supports 4G LTE calls on networks all over the world, availability being limited to operators' GSM plans.

In 2018, Apple added group video and audio support to FaceTime which can support up to 32 people in iOS 12 and macOS Mojave.

=== Zoom ===
Zoom is a videotelephony software program developed by Zoom Video Communications. The free version provides a video chatting service that allows up to 100 devices at once, with a 40-minute time restriction for free accounts having meetings of three or more participants. Users have the option to upgrade by subscribing to one of its plans, with the highest allowing up to 1,000 people concurrently, with no time restriction.

Zoom is compatible with Windows, macOS, iOS, Android, ChromeOS, and Linux. It is noted for its simple interface and usability, specifically for non-tech people. Features include one-on-one meetings, group video conferences, screen sharing, plugins, browser extensions, and the ability to record meetings and have them automatically transcribed. On some computers and operating systems, users are able to select a virtual background, which can be downloaded from different sites, to use as a backdrop behind themselves.

Use of the platform is free for video conferences of up to 100 participants at once, with a 40-minute time limit if there are more than two participants. For longer or larger conferences with more features, paid subscriptions are available, costing $15–20 per month. Features geared towards business conferences, such as Zoom Rooms, are available for $50–100 per month. Up to 49 people can be seen on a screen at once. Zoom has several tiers: Basic, Pro, Business, and Enterprise. Participants do not have to download the app if they are using Google Chrome or Firefox; they can click on a link and join from the browser. Zoom is not compatible with Safari for Macs.

Zoom security features include password-protected meetings, user authentication, waiting rooms, locked meetings, disabling participant screen sharing, randomly generated IDs, and the ability for the host to remove disruptive attendees. As of June 2020, Zoom began offering end-to-end encryption to business and enterprise users, with AES 256 GCM encryption enabled for all users. In October 2020, Zoom added end-to-end encryption for free and paid users. It's available on all platforms, except for the official Zoom web client.

Zoom also offers a transcription service using Otter.ai software that allows businesses to store transcriptions of the Zoom meetings online and search them, including separating and labeling different speakers.

As of July 2020, Zoom Rooms and Zoom Phone also became available as hardware as a service products. Zoom Phone is available for domestic telephone service in 40 countries as of August 2020. Zoom for Home, a category of products designed for home use, became available in August 2020.

=== Google Duo ===
Google Duo is a video chat mobile app developed by Google, available on the Android and iOS operating systems. It was announced at Google's developer conference on May 18, 2016, and began its worldwide release on August 16, 2016. It is also available to use via Google's Chrome web browser on desktop and laptop computers.

Google Duo lets users make video calls in high definition. It is optimized for low-bandwidth networks. End-to-end encryption is enabled by default. Duo is based on phone numbers, allowing users to call someone from their contact list. The app automatically switches between Wi-Fi and cellular networks. A "Knock Knock" feature lets users see a live preview of the caller before answering. An update in April 2017 lets users worldwide make audio-only calls.

As of December 1, 2016, Google Duo replaced Hangouts within the suite of Google apps device manufacturers must install in order to gain access to the Google Play Store, with Hangouts instead becoming optional.

In August 2020, it was reported that Google was planning to eventually replace Google Duo with Google Meet, but would continue to support Duo and "invest in building new features" in the long term.

=== Google Hangouts ===
Google Hangouts is a cross-platform messaging app developed by Google. Originally a feature of Google+, Hangouts became a stand-alone product in 2013, when Google also began integrating features from Google+ Messenger and Google Talk into Hangouts. In 2017, Google began developing Hangouts into a product aimed at enterprise communication, splitting into two products: Google Meet and Google Chat.

Google has also begun integrating features of Google Voice, its IP telephony product, into Hangouts, stating that Hangouts is designed to be "the future" of Voice. Google began transitioning users from the "classic" version of Hangouts to Meet and Chat in June 2020, and announced in October 2020 that Google Chat would eventually be made free to consumers and fully replace Hangouts, shortly after Google Meet became free as well. Google Hangouts will remain a consumer-level product for people using standard Google accounts.

Google Hangouts has a unique feature in that it allows video calls to be streamed live via YouTube.

=== Google Meet ===
Google Meet (formerly known as Hangouts Meet) is a video-communication service developed by Google. It is one of two apps that constitute the replacement for Google Hangouts, the other being Google Chat.

User features of Google Meet include:

- Two-way and multi-way audio and video calls with a resolution up to 720p
- An accompanying chat
- Call encryption between all users
- Noise cancelling audio filter
- Low-light mode for video
- Ability to join meetings through a web browser or through Android or iOS apps
- Integration with Google Calendar and Google Contacts for one-click meeting calls
- Screen-sharing to present documents, spreadsheets, presentations, or (if using a browser) other browser tabs
- Ability to call into meetings using a dial-in number in the US
- Hosts being able to deny entry and remove users during a call.

Google Meet uses proprietary protocols for video, audio and data transcoding. However, Google has partnered with the company Pexip to provide interoperability between Google Meet and SIP/H.323-based conferencing equipment and software.

Features for users who use Google Workspace accounts include:

- Up to 100 members per call for Google Workspace Starter users, up to 150 for Google Workspace Business users, and up to 250 for Google Workspace Enterprise users
- Ability to call into meetings with a dial-in number from selected countries
- Password-protected dial-in numbers for Google Workspace Enterprise edition users
- Real-time closed captioning based on speech recognition
- Background blurring

In March 2020, Google temporarily extended advanced features present in the enterprise edition to anyone using Google Workspace or G Suite for Education editions.

In March 2020, Google rolled out Meet to personal (free) Google accounts.

Free Meet calls can only have a single host and up to 100 participants, compared to the 250-caller limit for Google Workspace users and the 25-participant limit for Hangouts. Unlike business calls with Meet, consumer calls are not recorded and stored, and Google states that consumer data from Meet will not be used for advertisement targeting. While call data is reportedly not being used for advertising purposes, based on an analysis of Meet's privacy policy, Google reserves the right to collect data on call duration, who is participating, and participants' IP addresses.

Users need a Google account to initiate calls and like Google Workspace users, anyone with a Google account is able to start a Meet call from within Gmail.

=== Marco Polo ===
Marco Polo (app) is a video messaging and video hosting service mobile app. The app was created in 2014 by Joya Communications, founded by Vlada Bortnik and Michael Bortnik. The app markets itself as a video walkie talkie.

== Device-specific platforms ==
=== iMessage for iPhones ===
iMessage is an instant messaging service developed by Apple Inc. and launched in 2011. iMessage functions exclusively on Apple platforms: macOS, iOS, iPadOS, and watchOS.

Core features of iMessage, available on all supported platforms, include sending texts, images, videos, and documents; getting delivery and read statuses (read receipts); and end-to-end encryption (which means no one, including Apple itself, is able to intercept or tamper with sent messages). On all platforms except macOS, the service also allows sending location data and stickers. On iOS and iPadOS, third-party developers can extend iMessage capabilities with custom extensions (an example being quick sharing of recently played songs).

Launched on iOS in 2011, iMessage arrived on macOS (then called OS X) in 2012. In 2020, Apple announced an entirely redesigned version of the macOS Messages app which adds some of the features previously unavailable on the Mac, including location sharing and message effects.

=== Google Messages ===
Google Messages is an SMS and instant messaging application developed by Google for its Android mobile operating system. A web interface is also available. Launched in 2014, it has supported Rich Communication Services (RCS) messaging since 2018, marketed as "Chat" features. By April 2020, the app had more than a billion installs which was most likely due to Google's wider roll out of RCS to many different countries without carrier support.

=== Palringo ===
Palringo, or The World's Online Festival (WOLF), is a community-oriented messaging and gaming app for iOS and Android. The platform allows users to chat, entertain, and perform on a Stage—live microphone slots for up to 5 people, form and join large groups based on common interests, send instant messages and drop images and voice recordings into conversations. Launched under its original name of Palringo in 2006, the app has 80 million accounts worldwide and offers a range of games along with more than 380,000 groups, some of which have up to 2,500 members. Headquartered in London, WOLF has offices in Newcastle and London, UK, and Amman, Jordan.

== Groupware ==
"Groupware" refers to a number of varied applications that are designed to enable communication amongst members of a team, either within a company, a project, or some other group effort. these applications may incorporate a vast range of features and functions, rather than a single specialized function. Such platforms may include instant messaging, document sharing, visual diagrams, voice conference, and many other team-oriented features.

=== Microsoft Yammer ===
Yammer is a freemium enterprise social networking service used for private communication within organizations. Access to a Yammer network is determined by a user's Internet domain so that only individuals with approved email addresses may join their respective networks.

The service began as an internal communication system for the genealogy website Geni.com, and was launched as an independent product in 2008. Microsoft later acquired Yammer in 2012 for US$1.2 billion. Currently Yammer is included in all enterprise plans of Office 365 and Microsoft 365.

=== Adobe Connect ===
Adobe Connect (formerly Presedia Publishing System, Macromedia Breeze, and Adobe Acrobat Connect Pro) is a suite of software for remote training, web conferencing, presentation, and desktop sharing. All meeting rooms are organized into 'pods'; with each pod performing a specific role (e.g. chat, whiteboard, note etc.) Adobe Connect was formerly part of the Adobe Acrobat family and has changed names several times.

=== Google Workspace ===
Google Workspace, formerly known as G Suite, is a collection of cloud computing, productivity and collaboration tools, software and products developed and marketed by Google. It was first launched in 2006 as Google Apps for Your Domain and rebranded as G Suite in 2016. Google Workspace consists of Gmail, Contacts, Calendar, Meet and Chat for communication; Currents for employee engagement; Drive for storage; and the Google Docs suite for content creation. An Admin Panel is provided for managing users and services. Depending on edition Google Workspace may also include the digital interactive whiteboard Jamboard and an option to purchase such add-ons as the telephony service Voice. The education edition adds a learning platform Google Classroom and as of October 2020 retains the name G Suite for Education.

While most of these services are individually available at no cost to consumers who use their free Google (Gmail) accounts, Google Workspace adds enterprise features such as custom email addresses at a domain (e.g. @yourcompany.com), an option for unlimited Drive storage, additional administrative tools and advanced settings, as well as 24/7 phone and email support.

Being based in Google's data centers, data and information are saved directly and then synchronized to other data centers for backup purposes. Unlike the free, consumer-facing services, Google Workspace users do not see advertisements while using the services, and information and data in Google Workspace accounts do not get used for advertisement purposes. Furthermore, Google Workspace administrators can fine-tune security and privacy settings.

==== Google Chat ====
Google Chat is a communication software developed by Google built for teams that provides direct messages and team chat rooms, similar to competitors Slack and Microsoft Teams, along with a group messaging function that allows Google Drive content sharing. It is one of two apps that constitute the replacement for Google Hangouts, the other being Google Meet. Google planned to begin retiring Google Hangouts in October 2019.

The current version is for Google Workspace, (formerly G Suite until October 2020) customers only, with identical features in all packages except a lack of Vault data retention in the Basic package. However, in October 2020, Google announced plans to open Google Chat up to consumers as early as 2021, once Hangouts has been officially retired.

=== Slack ===
Slack offers many IRC-style features, including persistent chat rooms (channels) organized by topic, private groups, and direct messaging. Content, including files, conversations, and people, is all searchable within Slack. Users can add emoji buttons to their messages, on which other users can then click to express their reactions to messages.

Slack's free plan allows only the 10,000 most recent messages to be viewed and searched. On March 18, 2020, Slack redesigned its platform to simplify and customize the user experience.

Slack teams allow communities, groups, or teams to join a "workspace" via a specific URL or invitation sent by a team admin or owner. Although Slack was developed for professional and organizational communication, it has been adopted as a community platform, replacing message boards or social media groups.

Public channels allow team members to communicate without the use of email or group SMS (texting). Public channels are open to everyone in the workspace. Private channels allow for private conversation between smaller sub-groups. These private channels can be used to organize large teams. Direct messages allow users to send private messages to specific users rather than a group of people. Direct messages can include up to nine people. Once started, a direct message group can be converted into a private channel.

Slack integrates with many third-party services and supports community-built integrations, including Google Drive, Trello, Dropbox, Box, Heroku, IBM Bluemix, Crashlytics, GitHub, Runscope, Zendesk and Zapier. In December 2015, Slack launched their software application ("app") directory, consisting of over 150 integrations that users can install.

In March 2018, Slack announced a partnership with financial and human capital management firm Workday. This integration allows Workday customers to access Workday features directly from the Slack interface.

=== Discord ===
Discord is built to create and manage private and public communities. It gives users access to tools focused around communication like voice and video calls, persistent chat rooms and integrations with other gamer-focused services.

Discord communities are organized into discrete collections of channels called servers. A user can create servers for free, manage their public visibility and create one or more channels within that server.

Starting October 2017, Discord allows game developers and publishers to verify their servers. Verified servers, like verified accounts on social media sites, have badge to mark them as official communities. Verified servers are moderated by the developer's or publisher's own moderation team. Verification was later extended in February 2018 to include esports teams and musical artists.

By the end of 2017, about 450 servers were verified. Approximately 1790 servers are verified as of December 2020.

Discord users can improve the quality of the servers they reside in via the "Server Boost" feature, which improves quality of audio channels, streaming channels, number of emoji slots and other perks in 3 levels. Users can buy boosts to support the servers they choose, for a monthly amount. Possession of "Discord Nitro", the platform's paid subscription, gives a user two extra boosts to use on any server they like.

Channels may be either used for voice chat and streaming or for instant messaging and file sharing. The visibility and access to channels can be customized to limit access from certain users, for example marking a channel "NSFW" (Not Safe For Work) requires that first-time viewers confirm they are over 18 years old and willing to see such content.

=== Kune ===
Kune is a free/open source distributed social network focused on collaboration rather than just on communication. That is, it focuses on online real-time collaborative editing, decentralized social networking and web publishing, while focusing on workgroups rather than just on individuals. It aims to allow for the creation of online spaces for collaborative work where organizations and individuals can build projects online, coordinate common agendas, set up virtual meetings, publish on the web, and join organizations with similar interests. It has a special focus on Free Culture and social movements needs. Kune is a project of the Comunes Collective.

- All the functionalities of Apache Wave, that is collaborative federated real-time editing, plus
- Communication
  - Chat and chatrooms compatible with Gmail and Jabber through XMPP (with several XEP extensions), as it integrates Emite
  - Social networking (federated)
- Real-time collaboration for groups in:
  - Documents: as in Google Docs
  - Wikis
  - Lists: as in Google Groups but minimizing emails, through waves
  - Group Tasks
  - Group Calendar: as in Google Calendar, with ical export
  - Group Blogs
  - Web-creation: aiming to publish contents directly on the web (as in WordPress, with a dashboard and public view) (in development)
  - Bartering: aiming to decentralize bartering as in eBay
- Advanced email
  - Waves: aims to replace most uses of email
  - Inbox: as in email, all your conversations and documents in all kunes are controlled from your inbox
  - Email notifications (Projected: replies from email)
- Multimedia & Gadgets
  - Image or Video galleries integrated in any doc
  - Maps, mindmaps, Twitter streams, etc.
  - Polls, voting, events, etc.
  - and more via Apache Wave extensions, easy to program (as in Facebook apps, they run on top of Kune)

== See also ==
- Comparison of cross-platform instant messaging clients
- Comparison of instant messaging protocols
- Comparison of IRC clients
- Comparison of LAN messengers
- Comparison of VoIP software – Voice over IP software comparison
- List of SIP software
- List of video telecommunication services and product brands
