= Ditto (dating service) =

AI-powered dating service for college students

- Type: Private
- Industry: Online dating
- Founded: 2024
- Founders: Allen Wang; Eric Liu
- Headquarters: United States
- Area served: United States
- Products: AI matchmaking service via iMessage
- Website: ditto.ai

Ditto is an American online dating service that uses artificial intelligence to arrange in-person dates for college students. Unlike most dating platforms, Ditto operates through iMessage rather than a dedicated mobile application.

== History ==
Ditto was founded by Allen Wang and Eric Liu, who both dropped out of the University of California, Berkeley to start the company. The service launched first at the University of California, San Diego and later expanded to UC Berkeley, the University of Southern California, UCLA and UC Davis.

In February 2026, Ditto raised $9.2 million in a seed round led by Peak XV Partners, with participation from Gradient, Scribble Ventures, Alumni Ventures and Llama Venture.

== Service ==
Users interact with Ditto by texting an AI chatbot through iMessage to share their dating preferences and availability. The service proposes a specific date with a time and a location near the user's campus, with matches delivered on Wednesdays.

As of February 2026, Global Dating Insights reported that Ditto had approximately 42,000 registered users, with about 25 percent acquired through referrals and a reported 20 percent conversion rate from matches to actual dates. The company's website later stated that more than 151,000 people had joined the service as of May 2026.
