= Messaging Layer Security =

Messaging protocol

- Protocol stack
- Abbreviation: MLS
- Purpose: End-to-end encrypting messages
- Developers: Richard Barnes; Benjamin Beurdouche; Raphael Robert; Jon Millican; Emad Omara; Katriel Cohn-Gordon
- Introduction: July 2023; 3 years ago
- OSI layer: Application layer
- RFC: 9420
- Website: datatracker.ietf.org/wg/mls/about/

Messaging Layer Security (MLS) is a security layer for end-to-end encrypted messages. It is maintained by the MLS working group of the Internet Engineering Task Force (IETF), and is designed to provide an efficient and practical security mechanism for groups as large as 50,000 and for those who access chat systems from multiple devices.

== Security properties ==
Security properties of MLS include message confidentiality, message integrity and authentication, membership authentication, asynchronicity, forward secrecy, post-compromise security, and scalability.

== History ==
The idea was born in 2016 and first discussed in an unofficial meeting during IETF 96 in Berlin with attendees from Wire, Mozilla and Cisco.

Initial ideas were based on pairwise encryption for secure 1:1 and group communication. In 2017, an academic paper introducing Asynchronous Ratcheting Trees was published by the University of Oxford and Facebook setting the focus on more efficient encryption schemes.

The first BoF took place in February 2018 at IETF 101 in London. The founding members are Mozilla, Facebook, Wire, Google, Twitter, University of Oxford, and INRIA.

On March 29, 2023, the IETF approved publication of Messaging Layer Security (MLS) as a new standard. It was officially published on July 19, 2023. At that time, Google announced it intended to add MLS to the end to end encryption used by Google Messages over Rich Communication Services (RCS). In March 2025, the GSMA announced the Universal Profile 3.0 standard of RCS would support MLS and Apple announced it would support this RCS standard on Apple Messages. Both Google Messages and Apple Messages began the rollout of MLS E2EE over RCS in May 2026.

In 2023, a public grant for adding MLS support to XMPP was awarded.

Matrix is one of the protocols declaring migration to MLS.

In 2026, Discord rolled out end-to-end encryption on voice and video calls, using MLS for scalable group key exchanges.

Research on adding post-quantum cryptography (PQC) to MLS is ongoing. The IETF has prepared an Internet-Draft using PQC algorithms in MLS.

== Implementations ==
MLS implementations
Implementation	Language	License	Developer
OpenMLS	Rust	MIT	Phoenix R&D and Cryspen
MLS++	C++	BSD 2-Clause	Cisco
mls-rs	Rust	Apache 2.0	AWS Labs
MLS-TS	TypeScript	Apache 2.0	Matrix Foundation
xmtp_mls	Rust	MIT	XMTP Labs
