= Google Messages =

Messaging application developed by Google

- Screenshot
- Developer: Google
- Release: Android: 2014; 12 years ago Web: 2018; 8 years ago Wear OS: 2014; 12 years ago

Stable release(s) [±]
- Android: 20260727_03_RC00 / August 3, 2026; 3 months ago
- Wear OS: 20260731_00_RC01 / August 8, 2026; 3 months ago

Preview release(s) [±]
- Android: 20260807_01_RC00 / August 10, 2026; 2 months ago
- Wear OS: 20260803_03_RC00 / August 8, 2026; 3 months ago
- Operating system: Android 8+, Wear OS, web Discontinued: Android 5, 6, 7 (2022); KitKat (2018); Jelly Bean (2016)
- Predecessor: Various
- License: Apache License 2.0 (Android Messages); Proprietary (Google Messages)
- Website: messages.google.com

Google Messages (formerly known as Messenger, Android Messages, and Messages by Google) is a text messaging software application developed by Google for its Android and Wear OS mobile operating systems. It is also available as a web app.

Google's official universal messaging platform for the Android ecosystem, Messages employs SMS, MMS, and Rich Communication Services (RCS). Starting in 2023, Google has RCS activated by default on participating Android devices, similar to the implementation of iMessage on Apple devices. Samsung Messages was discontinued on July 6, 2026, for the US market, with Samsung transitioning users to Google Messages as the default messaging application.

== History ==
The original code for Android SMS messaging was released in 2009 integrated into the operating system. It was released as a standalone application independent of Android with the release of Android 5.0 Lollipop in 2014, replacing Google Hangouts as the default SMS app on Google's Nexus line of phones.

In 2018, Messages adopted RCS messages and evolved to send larger data files, sync with other apps, and even create mass messages. This was in preparation for when Google launched Messages for web.

In December 2019, Google began to introduce support for Rich Communication Services (RCS) messaging via an RCS service hosted by Google, referred to in the user interface as "chat features". This was followed by a wider global rollout throughout 2020.

The app surpassed 1 billion installs in April 2020, doubling its number of installs in less than a year.

Initially, RCS did not support end-to-end encryption. In June 2021, Google introduced end-to-end encryption in Messages by default using the Signal Protocol, for all one-to-one RCS-based conversations, for all RCS group chats in December 2022 for beta users, and for all RCS users by August 2023, as well as enabling RCS for all users by default to encourage encryption. In July 2023, Google announced it would build the Message Layer Security (MLS) end-to-end encryption protocol into Google Messages.

Beginning with the Samsung Galaxy S21, Messages replaces Samsung's in-house Messages app as the default text messaging app for One UI for some regions and carriers. In April 2021, the app began to receive UI modifications on Samsung devices to follow aspects of One UI, including pushing the top of the message list towards the middle of the screen to improve ergonomics.

In February 2023, Google began to replace references to "chat features" in the Messages user interface with "RCS". In August 2023, Google announced that Messages will use RCS by default for all users unless they opt out, to allow them to benefit from secure messaging. In December 2023, with the arrival of several new features, the app was renamed "Google Messages".

In July 2024, Samsung announced it would no longer pre-install Samsung Messages on its Galaxy devices in some regions, starting with the Galaxy Z Fold 6 and Flip, favoring Google Messages instead.

In April 2026, Samsung announced that Samsung Messages would be discontinued on July 6, 2026, for the US market only. It encouraged users to switch to Google Messages.

== Features ==
Some of the most important features in Google Messages are:

- Send instant text and voice messages in 1:1 or group chat conversations over mobile data and Wi-Fi, via Android, Wear OS or the web.
- End-to-end encryption for RCS chats.
- Typing, sent, delivered and read status
- Reply and react to specific messages
- Share files and high-resolution photos
- Voice message transcriptions
- Schedule messages
- In-app reminders for birthdays and messages you didn't respond to after some time with Nudges
- Tight integration with the Google ecosystem, e.g. Google Calendar, Meet, Maps, YouTube, Photos, Contacts, Assistant, Search, Safe Browsing etc.
- Web interface: Users can visit https://messages.google.com/web and either sign in with their Google account or scan the QR code that is shown with their smartphone to access a limited web version of the app that allows them to send and receive messages, provided the smartphone remains connected.
- Phone number recognition: The app shows the country and province of the caller. Additionally, it can show the company's name or a warning for spam calls if the number is registered in a data base.
- Access to the Gemini chatbot on select Pixel, Galaxy and Android devices. (Only for users over 18)

== See also ==
- Messages (Apple)
- iMessage
- Google Chat
- WhatsApp
- SMS
- Signal
