= Mnemonic (company) =

Norwegian cybersecurity company

- Type: Private
- Industry: Computer security
- Founded: 2000
- Headquarters: Oslo,
- Number of locations: Oslo, Norway; Stavanger, Norway; Kista, Sweden; Copenhagen, Denmark; Utrecht, Netherlands; London, United Kingdom
- Key people: Tønnes Ingebrigtsen, CEO
- Revenue: NOK 515 mil. (2019)
- Number of employees: 450
- Website: www.mnemonic.io

Mnemonic is a Norwegian privately owned cybersecurity company and managed detection and response (MDR) provider founded in 2000. The company is headquartered in Oslo with additional presence in Stavanger, Trondheim, Kista, Copenhagen, Utrecht, London, and has 450 employees (2025) the largest pure-play companies in the computer security business within the Nordics. The company provides a comprehensive range of IT security services, including 24/7 threat detection and response, threat intelligence, incident response, and ethical hacking, serving major enterprises including seven of the top ten companies in Norway.

Mnemonic functions as an advisor for Europol.
