= Rich Communication Services =

Mobile communication protocol based on mobile service

- Communication protocol
- Abbreviation: RCS
- Purpose: Instant messaging
- Developer: GSMA
- Introduction: 15 September 2008; 18 years ago (original specifications); 16 November 2016; 9 years ago (Universal Profile specifications)
- Based on: HTTP(S), SIP(S), (S)MSRP
- OSI layer: Application layer
- Port: Unknown
- Website: www.gsma.com/futurenetworks/rcs/

Rich Communication Services (RCS) is a communication protocol standard for instant messaging, primarily for mobile phones, developed and defined by the GSM Association (GSMA). It is a replacement of SMS and MMS on cellular networks with more modern features including high resolution image and video support, typing indicators, file sharing, and improved group chat functionality. Development of RCS began in 2007 but early versions lacked features and interoperability; a new specification named Universal Profile was developed and has been continually rolled out since 2017.

RCS has been designed as an industry open standard to provide improved capabilities over basic text messaging, based on the Internet Protocol (IP). Its development has also been supported by mobile network operators to remain relevant in customer experience in response to over-the-top (OTT) chat apps and services. Additional features of RCS include presence information, location and multimedia sharing, video calling, and operation over mobile data or Wi-Fi, natively integrated in mobile phones without requiring the download of third-party apps.

As of 2020, RCS had rolled out across 90 cell operators in 60 countries globally, and had an estimated 2.5 billion monthly active users as of 2024. The Google Guest program formerly provided person-to-person (P2P) RCS in Google Messages on Android when a carrier does not provide RCS, provided via the Google Jibe backend. However, Google began the discontinuation of Google Guest in 2025. Alternatively, RCS service may be provided by a carrier directly; by 2025, carrier partnerships with Google Jibe for direct service have become common. Providing direct RCS service allows for support of additional clients such as Apple Messages, and enables carriers to make the additional choice of providing RCS Business Messages (RBM). Apple added support for RCS in Messages with iOS 18 in September 2024; RCS is also accessible through desktops via the web client of Google Messages or via Microsoft Phone Link.

Google Messages was the first client to offer end-to-end encryption (E2EE) over RCS. E2EE using Messaging Layer Security (MLS) was added to the RCS standard in March 2025. As of May 2026, the GSMA standard for E2EE is in rollout for Google Messages and Apple Messages.

== Branding ==
RCS is also marketed as Advanced Messaging and 5G Messaging (in China); it was previously variously marketed as chat features, enhanced chat, joyn, and SMS+. These should not be confused with SMSoIP, enabling SMS over all-IP infrastructure such as modern LTE and 5G deployments.

== Software support ==
An RCS thread on Google's messaging client, showing emojis, images, location, and a file, sent by the user

Samsung Electronics was one of the first major device original equipment manufacturers (OEMs) to support the RCS initiative and it commercially launched RCS capable devices in Europe in 2012 and in the United States in 2015. Following the launch of the new RCS Universal Profile specification, Samsung supported it on new devices since 2017 in its stock Messages app. In December 2020, Samsung updated its One UI Messages app to also allow users to opt into RCS using Google's Jibe backend instead of carriers in certain regions.

The Samsung Messages client brands the RCS capability as chat features, and displays Enter chat message in the message box. Starting in 2024, Samsung Messages was no longer coming preinstalled on Galaxy phones sold in the United States in favor of Google Messages. In January 2025, the app was removed from the Google Play Store while remaining functional for existing users. However, development later resumed and RCS capability was re-added. Samsung Messages was subsequently discontinued in the United States on July 6, 2026, for devices running Android 12 and later, with Samsung directing users to migrate to Google Messages.

Mobile phones running Android with Google Play Services support RCS with its native messaging app, Google Messages, beginning with Android Lollipop. In June 2019, Google announced that it would begin to deploy the RCS on an opt-in basis via the Messages app. This service was compliant with the Universal Profile and hosted by Google Jibe if the carrier does not provide RCS, which is also known as the Google Guest program. Google began the discontinuation of Google Guest in 2025. Before 2023, the Google Messages app branded RCS communication as Chat, before it was renamed to RCS to be clearer. In March 2024, it was reported that Google was "silently" blocking RCS on rooted Androids.

Other Android powered devices such as Huawei's HarmonyOS in China also support RCS through native messaging clients (EMUI version 8.1+).

In June 2024, Apple announced that support for RCS would be added to the Messages app in iOS 18; as with SMS, RCS is displayed with green message bubbles and buttons, although an RCS indicator is displayed in the message composer text field. iOS 18 launched with support for RCS in September 2024.

== Commercial deployments ==
Commercial RCS Deployments
Region	Backend	App	Platform	End-to-End Encryption	Notes
🌐 Global	Google Jibe	Google Messages	Android	Yes (via Messaging Layer Security (MLS) standard support rolling out as of May 2026. Previously, via custom extension using Signal protocol)	While Google initially provided RCS indiscriminately to all compatible Android phones without implicit carrier support, this is not the case anymore.
🌐 Global	Google Jibe	Messages (Apple)	iOS 18+	Yes (via Messaging Layer Security (MLS) standard support, starting from iOS 26.5)	E2EE support is only enabled if a carrier supports it in its iOS Carrier Bundle.
🌐 Global	Google Jibe	Samsung Messages	Android		Discontinued in the United States on July 6, 2026, with Samsung transitioning users to Google Messages. The app still remains available in other regions.
India		JioSandesh Messages (Apple)	Android, iOS		Jio does not connect to global RCS network.
Japan	Synchronoss	+Message	Android, iOS		KDDI, NTT DOCOMO, and SoftBank. Does not connect to global RCS network.Starting from 2025, KDDI has encouraged subscribers to migrate away.
China	ZTE	Multiple native messaging clients	HarmonyOS, HyperOS, iOS 18+		
South Korea		Samsung Galaxy Chatting+ Messages (Apple)	Android, iOS		Joint initiative between Samsung Electronics, KT, SKT and LG U+.

== Development and history ==
=== Launch and "joyn" ===
The Rich Communication Suite industry initiative was formed by a group of industry promoters in 2007. In February 2008 the GSM Association (GSMA) officially became the project home of RCS and an RCS steering committee was established by the organization, officially announced as Rich Communications Suite on 15 September 2008, later known as Rich Communication Services. The companies involved in launching it were: operators Orange, Telecom Italia, Telefonica and TeleSonera, network vendors Ericsson and Nokia Siemens Networks, and device vendors Nokia, Sony Ericsson and Samsung. The steering committee specified the definition, testing, and integration of the services in the application suite.

By 2010, RCS had released Version 4 of its specification, however progress was slow and it had yet to be deployed on commercial subscriber services. During this time, closed internet-based instant messaging services (known in the industry as "OTT" (over-the-top) providers) were rising in popularity. To accelerate development, the RCS project released a new specification – RCS-e (e = "enhanced"), which included various iterations of the original RCS specifications. At Mobile World Congress 2012, RCS-e was launched under the consumer brand name "joyn" (a brand that has since been abandoned). The full list of carriers that agreed to support RCS-e at the time were AT&T, Bell Mobility, Bharti Airtel, Deutsche Telekom, Jio, KPN, KT Corporation, LG U+, Orange, Orascom Telecom, Rogers Communications, SFR, SK Telecom, Telecom Italia, Telefónica, Telia Company, Telus, Verizon and Vodafone. That year, the first RCS-e/Joyn services were rolled out by networks in Spain, Germany and the US.

However, the RCS standard struggled with fragmentation and incompatibility, with one industry analyst stating in 2015 that the project was a "zombie [...] infected with bureaucracy, complexity, and irrelevance". A Mountain View-based startup called Jibe Mobile, headed and cofounded by Iranian-American engineer Amir Sarhangi, attempted to solve the situation having built an in-house cloud platform claimed to be fully RCS interoperable between carriers, and offering a fast deployment of the service to the carriers. Some operators like Orange and Deutsche Telekom had previously signed up to the Jibe cloud platform.

=== Universal profile ===
Google purchased Jibe Mobile in September 2015, and Amir Sarhangi led the RCS project at Google. Subsequently Google Jibe worked together with the GSMA which led to the creation of the Universal Profile standard. The GSMA published the Universal Profile in November 2016. The Universal Profile is a single GSMA specification, and carriers that deploy the Universal Profile makes interconnection with other carriers possible, designed to help carriers launch RCS quickly and scale easily.

The new standard, helped by promotion from Google, finally led to RCS taking off: in early 2017, there were 47 mobile network operators, 11 manufacturers, and 2 OS providers (Google and Microsoft) that had announced their support of the Universal Profile. To accelerate adoption, Google transferred the team that was working on Google Allo to work on a wider RCS implementation, then in 2019 it launched the Google Guest program to provide an OTT (over-the-top) RCS solution using Jibe to all Google Android users for person-to-person (P2P) traffic without requiring carrier support. Google Guest rolled out globally by 2020. Google began the discontinuation of Google Guest in 2025. Google Guest was not used for RCS Business Messaging (RBM).

==== Adoption ====
In October 2019, the four major U.S. carriers announced an agreement to form the Cross-Carrier Messaging Initiative (CCMI) to jointly implement RCS using a newly developed app. This service was to be compatible with the Universal Profile. However, this carrier-made app was never implemented, and RCS via Google Guest and Google Jibe in Google Messages was rolled out by 2020. By 2021, both T-Mobile (now merged with Sprint) and AT&T signed deals with Google to adopt Google Messages. In 2023, T-Mobile and AT&T agreed to use Google Jibe directly to implement RCS services, and in 2024 Verizon agreed to use Google Jibe directly, an alternative to both self-implemented RCS and Google Guest. Google began the discontinuation of Google Guest in 2025.

While playing a key role in the growth of RCS in most markets, Google services are banned in China. The three Chinese carriers together announced in April 2020 that they will roll out RCS, branded as 5G Messaging. Both China Telecom and China Unicom had rolled out the services within two years time. However, China Mobile, the country's and also world's largest mobile carrier, delayed the roll-out until it began in December 2023. In 2020, Germany's three carriers had all rolled out RCS services, interconnected and provided by Mavenir; Mavenir's RCS network also started powering carrier Rakuten Mobile in Japan, however this network is not linked to the RCS network used by Japan's three largest carriers, who use their own network named +Message that is currently not based on the Universal Profile specifications and not connected to the global RCS network.

In 2022, Apple CEO Tim Cook repeatedly stated that the company had no plans to support RCS on its devices or any interoperability with iMessage. However in November 2023, Apple announced RCS support would be added to Messages. Multiple media reports claimed pressure from European regulators and/or the US Justice Department led to Apple's reversal. In 2023, Chinese regulators ruled that all new 5G handsets sold in China from 2024 must support RCS. Technology blogger John Gruber claimed this Chinese regulation was instead the likely cause of Apple's reversal. In September 2024, iOS 18 was released with RCS support.

== Comparison with SMS ==
SMS (Short Messaging Service) was deployed on cellular networks in the 1990s alongside the earliest 2G digital GSM networks. It uses traditional circuit switching technology, as opposed to the data-based packet oriented standards that were introduced with newer technologies like GPRS and which have become standard. SMS has numerous limitations compared to more modern messaging standards (as in instant messenger clients), such as a 160 character limit, lack of read receipts, and media sharing (images may be shared but these would be sent as an MMS, with an increased charge). RCS aims to be a modern successor with newer features while still remaining an open standard for cell networks like SMS and hence would also not be a closed "walled garden" like commercial messaging networks (also known as OTT (over-the-top) services) such as Messenger and WhatsApp.

Additionally, RCS is IP-based, instead of the Signalling System No. 7 (SS7) standard that SMS uses. Unlike SMS, RCS may require an Internet connection depending on the RCS servers; this is further explained in the Technical details section below.

== RCS Business Messaging ==
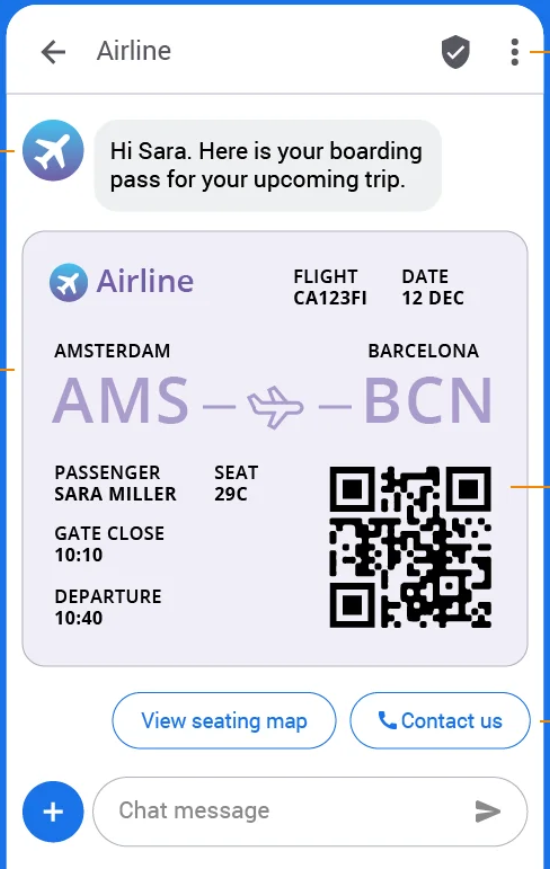
An example of an RCS Business chat: the chatbot sender has a verified identity, messages include images, and the receiver may choose from purpose-made responses

RCS Business Messaging (RBM) is the business-to-consumer (B2C) (A2P in telecoms terminology) version of RCS. RBM includes unique features, including predefined quick-reply suggestions, rich cards, carousels, and branding, designed to improve customer engagement and interactive features that facilitate new use cases. These are available as standard on preloaded RCS-enabled text messaging apps.

RBM is intended as a response to third-party messengers (or OTTs) absorbing mobile operators' messaging traffic and associated revenues. While RCS is designed to win back Person-to-Person (P2P) traffic, RBM is intended to retain and grow this A2P traffic. These additional features are only available with the use of a messaging-as-a-platform (MaaP) server integrated with the operator's network. SMS currently suffers from grey routes, where A2P messages are sent over P2P connections, which are cheaper or often free.

Unlike RCS P2P, before it was discontinued, Google Guest was not used for RBM, which is always a carrier-supported messaging service. A carrier may support RCS P2P but not RBM.

== Technical details ==
RCS Universal Profile is based on 3GPP's IP Multimedia Subsystem (IMS) architectural framework and uses Session Initiation Protocol (SIP) to establish sessions and exchange messages and other content.

RCS may require an Internet connection depending on the RCS servers: in an IMS 'single registration' setup, the SIP messaging traffic can be forwarded to be sent directly to the carrier's network, instead of going over the top across the Internet in a 'dual registration' scenario. In cases where RCS is able to operate over cellular networks without data, it supports messaging as well as file transfer, enriched calling, and more.

=== Features ===
A thread of group conversation in the Google Messages application on Android

RCS Universal Profile aims to build on SMS with additional interactive features that have become increasingly relevant in world of instant messaging. This includes typing indicators, read receipts, file sharing, high-resolution photo and video sharing, improved group chat functionality, audio messaging, and providing phonebook polling for service discovery. The service directly links to the user's phone number and does not require any account registrations, nor does it require downloading and setting up of third-party chat apps from an app store.

==== Encryption support ====
End-to-end encryption (E2EE) via Messaging Layer Security (MLS) was specified by Universal Profile RCS 3.0 for P2P RCS in March 2025. As of May 2026, implementation of the GSMA standard for E2EE is in rollout for Google Messages and Apple Messages in iOS 26.5.

RCS uses Transport Layer Security encryption when E2EE is not available. Google claims it will only retain message data in transit until it is delivered to the recipient over Google Jibe infrastructure.

RCS Business Messaging (RBM) does not offer E2EE. When provided by Google, RBM uses encryption to protect messages in transit between user devices and Google's servers, as well as between Google's servers and messaging partners.

MLS support of post-quantum cryptography (PQC) is noted in the GSMA's E2EE Specification for RCS. The Internet Engineering Task Force has prepared an Internet-Draft using PQC algorithms in MLS.

Previously, E2EE was not a feature of RCS specified by GSMA, instead deferring to the individual clients to establish E2EE. In November 2020, Google announced that it would begin to roll out E2EE for one-on-one conversations on their Google Messages client – using RCS but not part of the GSMA's RCS specifications – beginning with the beta version of the app. Google stated it would work with any company on RCS E2EE compatibility. Google Messages added E2EE using the Signal Protocol as the default option for one-on-one RCS conversations starting in June 2021. In December 2022, E2EE was added to group chats in Google Messages for beta users and was made available to all users in August 2023. Additionally, Google Messages enabled RCS by default to encourage E2EE adoption.

In July 2023, Google announced it was developing support for the Messaging Layer Security (MLS) E2EE standard in Google Messages to encourage interoperability of messaging platforms. In November 2023, Apple stated it will not support Google's E2EE extension over RCS, but would work with GSMA to create an RCS E2EE standard. In September 2024, the GSMA announced it was working on bringing E2EE to the standard. In December 2024, a GSMA spokesperson said the market would be updated with E2EE "in the coming months". In March 2025, Apple and Google announced they would support Universal Profile 3.0 with E2EE. A Google employee was credited as the author of the GSMA's RCS E2EE Specification Version 1.0 based on MLS, used in Universal Profile 3.0. In August 2025, tech reporter Aamir Siddiqui uncovered RCS MLS E2EE development activity in iOS 26 beta code. In February 2026, Apple announced testing of E2EE RCS, starting with Apple devices only, on the developer beta of iOS 26.4. In May 2026, Apple confirmed iOS 26.5 would support RCS E2EE in beta between iPhone and Android devices on supported carriers.

=== Interconnection and hubs ===
Mobile network carriers/operators typically have two ways to deploy RCS services: either basing it on their own IMS infrastructure, or use a third-party hosted service. Like SMS, RCS requires national and international interconnects to enable roaming. As with SMS, this will be accomplished with hubbing – where third-party providers complete agreements with individual operators to interwork their systems. Each subsequent operator that connects to a hub is therefore connected automatically to all other connected operators. This eliminates the need to each operator to connect to all the others to which they may need to send messages. RCS hubs are provided by stakeholders with a vested interest in increasing RCS use. These include traditional SMS hub providers (e.g. Sinch), and software and hardware vendors (e.g. Mavenir, ZTE, and most notably Google's Jibe Cloud platform).

== Reception ==
In 2018, Amnesty International researcher Joe Westby criticized RCS for not allowing end-to-end encryption (E2EE), because it was treated as a service of carriers and thus subject to lawful interception. In March 2025, the GSMA published an RCS E2EE specification based on Messaging Layer Security (MLS), and in May 2026 Apple and Google began rolling out E2EE RCS messaging in beta for supported iPhone and Android users.

The Verge in 2019 criticized the inconsistent support of RCS in the United States, with carriers not supporting RCS in all markets, not certifying service on all phones, or not yet supporting the Universal Profile. It also raised concerns over Google's decision to operate its own Google-hosted RCS service due to the possibility of antitrust scrutiny, while acknowledging that Google had done so to bypass inconsistent carrier support and make Android messaging more comparable to Apple's iMessage. By 2024, AT&T, T-Mobile, and Verizon had moved, or announced plans to move, their RCS services to Google's Jibe platform.

Ars Technica in 2019 criticized Google's move to launch a direct-to-consumer Google Guest RCS service, considering it a contradiction of RCS being native to carriers while providing features reminiscent of messaging apps. It described the move as another in a series of Google messaging efforts, including Google Talk, Google+ Messenger, Hangouts, and Allo, and noted limitations such as reliance on phone numbers as identity, limited multi-device synchronization, and the lack of E2EE at the time.

As reported by Brian Chen of The New York Times in 2023, Apple's adoption of RCS was an important social shift in ending "green versus blue bubble” elitism between iPhone and Android users.

== Specifications ==
=== Current feature availability ===
Feature support summary
Feature	Added in version	Google Messages (July 2025)	iOS Messages (27 beta)
Threaded and quoted message replies	2.7	Yes	Partial
Edit and delete messages	2.7	Yes	Partial
Custom emoji reactions	2.7, 3.0	Yes	Partial
End-to-end Encryption (E2EE)	3.0	Yes	Yes (as of iOS 26.5)
xHE-AAC	3.1	?	?
Rich text formatting	4.0	No	No
Native video calls	4.0	No	No

=== RCS Universal Profile ===
The GSMA's Universal Profile is a globally agreed-upon standard for implementing RCS. The profile allows subscribers of different carriers and nations to communicate with each other. Universal Profile became the dominant RCS specification since its introduction. Google Jibe worked with the GSMA to create the Universal Profile standard.

Version 1.0 (November 2016)
References RCS Advanced Communications Services and Client Specification (RACSCS) Release 6.0 Version 7.0. Includes capability discovery which is interoperable between regions, chat, group chat, file transfer, audio messaging, video share, multi-device, enriched calling, location share and live sketching.
Version 2.0 (July 2017)
RACSCS Release 7.0 Version 8.0. Includes Messaging as a Platform (MaaP) with chatbots, also known as RCS Business Messages, APIs, plug-in integration and improved authentication and app security. Adds group chat icons, group chat change of subject, and file transfer enhancements. Support for passing group chat administrator to another participant, and allowing various features to fall back to SMS.
Version 2.1 (December 2017)
References the same RACSCS Release 7.0 Version 8.0 as Universal Profile Version 2.0.
Version 2.2 (May 2018)
RACSCS Release 8.0 Version 9.0. Added additional chatbot features and vCard 4.0 format support.
Version 2.3 (December 2018)
RACSCS Release 9.0 Version 10.0. Support for large pager standalone messages.
Version 2.4 (October 2019)
RACSCS Version 11.0. Removes plug-in integration and includes integrated seamless web-view. Added additional chatbot features. This version is used in Messages (Apple) with iOS 18.
Version 2.5 (October 2020)
RACSCS Version 12.0. Additional messaging verification and chatbot features.
Version 2.6 (December 2022)
RACSCS Version 13.0. Optional procedures for file transfer authentication and additional chatbot verification.
Version 2.7 (June 2024)
RACSCS Version 14.0. Adds support for sending message replies, custom emoji reactions, editing and deleting messages. Improves spam handling and adds chatbot features. Google Messages had implemented some of the features in this version.
Version 3.0 (March 2025)
RACSCS Version 15.0. RCS E2EE Specification Version 1.0. E2EE using the MLS protocol for peer to peer, 1-to-1 and group messages, but not chatbots. Apple and Google announced support for UP 3.0 E2EE but it has not been implemented yet. Also adds a richer deep link format for businesses, procedures for unsubscribing and resubscribing to chatbots, improved message reactions, and new codecs to improve audio messaging.
Version 3.1 (July 2025)
RACSCS Version 16.0. RCS E2EE Specification Version 2.0. Includes new mechanisms for connecting RCS clients to operator services, attempting to improve reliability especially in challenging coverage conditions. Introduces support of xHE-AAC audio codec to improve voice message quality. Other improvements include better spam reporting, improved file transfer security, and the use of deep links to initiate a conversation.
Version 4.0 (February 2026)
RACSCS Version 17.0. RCS E2EE Specification Version 3.0. Supports 1-to-1 or group, E2EE video calls, rich text formatting including bold, italics, and strikethrough, identification of client support of media format support for higher quality audio, video, and images. Adds support for embedding streaming video and control of how links open to RCS Business Messages.
Version 4.1 (July 2026)
RACSCS Version 18.0. RCS E2EE Specification Version 4.0. Supports profile sharing with granular controls for privacy, and gRPC-based connectionless transport for improved network stability, faster message delivery, reduced battery drain, and greater reliability.

=== Historical specifications ===
Before Universal Profile RCS became the dominant RCS specification, there was a variety of proprietary RCS specifications that did not allow RCS messaging between carriers. More precisely, there is a common base specification (RACSCS), but it contains a large number of optional features. It is difficult to ensure interoperability between carriers and/or implementations using different sets of optional features.

==== RCS Advanced Communications Services and Client Specification ====
The RACSCS defines a basic framework for RCS. It predates the Universal Profile and remains maintained as the basis of the Universal Profile.

RCS combined different services defined by 3GPP and Open Mobile Alliance (OMA) with an enhanced phonebook. Another phone's capabilities and presence information could be discovered and displayed by a mobile phone. RCS reuses 3GPP specified IMS core system as the underlying service platform to take care of issues such as authentication, authorization, registration, charging and routing.

Release 1 Version 1.0 (15 December 2008)

Offered the first definitions for the enrichment of voice and chat with content sharing, driven from an RCS enhanced address book (EAB).

Release 2 Version 1.0 (31 August 2009)

Added broadband access to RCS features: enhancing the messaging and enabling sharing of files.

Release 3 Version 1.0 (25 February 2010)

Focused on the broadband device as a primary device.

Release 4 Version 1.0 (14 February 2011)

Included support for LTE.

Release 5 Version 1.0 (19 April 2012)

RCS 5.0 was completely backwards-compatible with RCS-e V1.2 specifications and also includes features from RCS 4 and new features such as IP video call, IP voice call and Geo-location exchange. RCS5.0 supported both OMA CPM and OMA SIMPLE IM. RCS 5.0 included the following features.
- Standalone Messaging
- 1-2-1 Chat
- Group Chat
- File Transfer
- Content Sharing
- Social Presence Information
- IP Voice call (IR.92 and IR.58)
- IP Video call (IR.94)
- Geolocation Exchange
- Capability Exchange based on Presence or SIP OPTIONS

Release 5.1

5.1 was completely backwards compatible with the RCS-e V1.2 and RCS 5.0 specifications. It introduced additional new features such as Group Chat Store & Forward, File Transfer in Group Chat, File Transfer Store & Forward, and Best Effort Voice Call, as well as lessons-learnt and bug fixes from the V1.2 interoperability testing efforts. RCS 5.1 supported both OMA CPM and OMA SIMPLE IM.
- Version 1.0 (13 August 2012)
- Version 2.0 (3 May 2013)
- Version 3.0 (9 September 2013)
- Version 4.0 (28 November 2013)

Release 5.2 Version 5.0 (7 May 2014)

Improved central message store and introduced service extension tags into the specification. It also introduced a number of incremental improvements and bug fixes to RCS 5.1 V4.0 that improved the user experience and resolve issues that were noticed in deployed RCS networks.

Release 5.3 Version 6.0 (28 February 2015)

Release 6.0 Version 7.0 (21 March 2016)

First version to be incorporated into Universal Profile, as were the subsequent versions.

==== RCS-e (RCS enhanced) ====
RCS-e was an attempt by Europe's five biggest mobile operators to galvanize RCS with a simplified version of RCS (in other words, they agree on what features to use and what to possibly add to the base standard). In other words, it is a profile derived from the standard RACSCS.

- Initial Version (May 2011)
- Version 1.2 (28 November 2011)
- Version 1.2.2 (4 July 2012)

===== Joyn =====
Joyn was a service brand of RCS-e.

- Joyn Hot Fixes (15 July 2013) – based upon the RCS-e 1.2.2 specification, this includes P2P chat, group chat, MSRP file sharing and video sharing (during a circuit-switched call). Services based upon this specification were live in Spain, France and Germany.
- Joyn Blackbird Drop 1 (19 June 2013) – based upon the RCS 5.1 specification, this extends the Joyn Hot Fixes service to include HTTP file sharing, location sharing, group file sharing, and other capabilities such as group chat store and forward. Joyn Blackbird Drop 1 was backwards compatible with Joyn Hot Fixes. Vodafone Spain's network is accredited for Joyn Blackbird Drop 1, and Telefónica and Orange Spain have also been involved in interoperability testing with vendors of Joyn Blackbird Drop 1 clients. A number of client vendors were accredited to Joyn Blackbird Drop 1.
- Joyn Blackbird Drop 2 (26 September 2013) – also based upon the RCS 5.1 specification, this primarily added IP voice and video calling.
- Joyn Crane (18 August 2015)

== Launch history ==
Apple maintains a global list of carriers, identifying those that support Universal Profile RCS messaging in Messages (Apple). These carriers that support RCS Person-to-Person (P2P) do not necessarily support RCS Business Messages, also known as Application-to-Person (A2P). Google Messages supports RCS with these carriers. The GSMA states that Universal Profile support is optional in 4G, but mandatory in 5G networks and devices.

RCS launches
Operator	Country	Launch date	Backend RCS service	Android	iPhone RCS Personal Chat	iPhone RCS Business Messaging	Note
Airtel	India	February 2016		Yes			
AT&T	United States	November 2015	Google Jibe	Yes	iOS 18	No	Branded as Advanced Messaging and Video Call. In June 2023, AT&T converted to Google Jibe for RCS services. AT&T announced the RCS capable AT&T Messages Android apps would be discontinued in 2024, recommending use of Google Messages instead.
au	Japan			Yes	Yes		Android uses Google Messages app.
Base	Belgium	February 2021		Yes	Yes	No	
Bell	Canada			Yes	Yes	No	Universal Profile.
Boost Mobile	United States	December 2024		Yes	iOS 18.2		Universal Profile.
BT	United Kingdom			Yes	Yes		
C Spire	United States			Yes	iOS 18	No	
Celcom	Malaysia	May 2017		Yes			Universal Profile.
China Mobile	China			Yes			Universal Profile.
Claro	Multiple markets List: Argentina; Brazil; Colombia; Ecuador; Paraguay; Peru; Puerto Rico; Uruguay	May 2013		Yes			Branded as joyn.
Consumer Cellular	United States			Yes	iOS 18		
COSMOTE	Greece			Yes			Branded as Message+
Cricket Wireless	United States			Yes	iOS 18		
Deutsche Telekom	Germany	February 2013		Yes	Yes	Yes	Branded as Message+
EE	United Kingdom			Yes	Yes		
Fido Solutions	Canada	December 2016		Yes	Yes	No	Universal Profile.
FirstNet	United States			Yes	iOS 18		
Freedom Mobile	Canada	October 2018		Yes	Yes	No	Universal Profile.
Globe Telecom	Philippines	February 2018		Yes			Universal Profile
Google Fi Wireless	United States	January 2019		Yes	iOS 18.4 (since Beta 2)	No	Universal Profile.
H20 Wireless	United States			Yes	iOS 18		
Jio	India	September 2016		Yes			Branded as Jio4GVoice.
KDDI	Japan	May 2018		Yes (+Message Japan only)	iOS 18.4 (and +Message Japan only)	Yes	Using +Message on iOS or Android, will not connect to global RCS networks.
KT	South Korea	December 2012					Branded as joyn. Discontinued in 2016.
LG U+	South Korea	December 2012					Branded as joyn. Discontinued in 2016.
Metro by T-Mobile	United States	November 2012		Yes	iOS 18		Branded as joyn.
Mint Mobile	United States			Yes	iOS 18.4 (Since Beta 2)	Yes	Universal Profile.
Movistar	Spain	June 2012		Yes	Yes		Branded as joyn.
MTS	Russia	October 2020					Only for Samsung smartphones and only for Moscow customers, MTS Connect still works for all MTS customers
NTT Docomo	Japan	May 2018		Yes (+Message Japan only)	Yes (+Message Japan only)		Using +Message on iOS or Android, will not connect to global RCS networks.
O_{2}	Germany	2015		Yes	Yes	Yes	Branded as Message+Call.
O_{2}	United Kingdom		Google Jibe	Yes	No	No	
Orange	Multiple markets List: Belgium; DR Congo; Côte d'Ivoire; France; Guinea; Guinea-Bissau; Jordan; Madagascar; Moldova; Morocco; Niger; Poland; Romania; Senegal; Slovakia; Spain; Tunisia	2019		Yes	France: iOS 18.4 Spain: iOS 18	Belgium: No France: Yes Spain: Yes	Branded as Chat Messages in Romania, joyn elsewhere. Since July 2018 branded as Chat – Universal profile in Slovakia. Service in France was interrupted as of 14 November 2017.
Proximus	Belgium	August 2020		Yes	Yes	No	
PureTalk	United States			Yes	iOS 18		
Rakuten Mobile	Japan	April 2020		Yes	Yes		As part of Link application.
Red Pocket	United States			Yes	iOS 18		
Rogers Wireless	Canada	December 2016	Carrier	Yes	Yes	No	Universal Profile.
SFR	France	May 2015		Yes	Yes	Yes	Initially branded as joyn, now RCS.
SK Telecom	South Korea	December 2012		Yes			Branded as joyn.
Slovak Telekom	Slovakia	June 2014		Yes			Branded as joyn.
SoftBank Corp.	Japan	May 2018		Yes (+Message Japan only)	Yes (+Message Japan only)		Using +Message on iOS or Android, will not connect to global RCS networks.
Spectrum Mobile	United States			Yes	iOS 18	No	
Swisscom	Switzerland	April 2020					Branded as Message+ Discontinued in 2023.
Telus	Canada		Google Jibe	Yes	Yes		Also supported on their Koodo Mobile brand.
T-Mobile US	United States	July 2015	Google Jibe	Yes	iOS 18	Yes	Branded as Advanced Messaging. In September 2023, T-Mobile US converted to Google Jibe for RCS services.
Telcel	Mexico	February 2013		Yes			Branded as joyn.
Telekom	Romania	June 2014		Yes			Branded as joyn.
Telekom	Hungary			Yes			Universal Profile.
Telekom Albania	Albania			Yes			Universal Profile.
Telenor	Multiple markets List: Bulgaria; Denmark; Hungary; India; Malaysia; Montenegro; Myanmar; Norway; Pakistan; Serbia; Sweden; Thailand	February 2017		Yes			Universal Profile.
Telia Company	Sweden	December 2017		Yes			Branded as SMS+.
Telia Company	Norway	February 2018		Yes			Branded as SMS+.
Telkom Mobile	South Africa			Yes			Universal Profile.
Telstra	Australia	October 2017		Yes			Branded as Telstra Messaging. Universal Profile v2.
TracFone Wireless	United States			Yes	iOS 18	Yes	Universal Profile.
Ultra Mobile	United States			Yes	iOS 18.4	Yes	
UScellular	United States	October 2018		Yes	iOS 18	No	Universal Profile.
US Mobile	United States	October 2024		Yes	Warp: iOS 18 Light Speed: iOS 18.4		For iPhone, Warp network only, announced by CEO, Ahmed Khattak, on the US Mobile Subreddit.
Verizon	United States	December 2018	Google Jibe	Yes	iOS 18	Yes	Branded as Chat. In February 2024, Verizon converted to using Google Jibe for RCS services. Verizon discontinued the RCS capable Verizon Messages (Message+) Android app in December 2024, recommending use of Google Messages instead.
Visible by Verizon	United States			Yes	iOS 18		
Vodacom	South Africa			Yes			Universal Profile.
Vodafone	Multiple markets List: Albania; Czech Republic; Germany; Greece; Hungary; Ireland; Italy; Malta; Netherlands; New Zealand; Portugal; Romania; Spain; Turkey; United Kingdom; Egypt	2012-2017		Yes	Germany: Yes	Germany: Yes Spain: Yes United Kingdom: No	Universal Profile. First Branded as joyn. Since November 2013 Message+.
Xfinity Mobile	United States			Yes	iOS 18		

== See also ==
- Matrix communication protocol
- XMPP, Extensible Messaging and Presence Protocol
- Multimedia Messaging Service (MMS)
- Instant messaging
- Text messaging
