= IMessage =

Instant messaging service by Apple

iMessage

- A thread of conversation in the Messages application on macOS Sonoma
- Developer: Apple
- Type: Instant messaging
- Launched: October 12, 2011; 15 years ago
- Platforms: iPhone; Apple Watch; iPad; iPod Touch; Mac; Apple Vision Pro
- Operating systems: iOS 5 and later; iPadOS; macOS High Sierra and later; watchOS; visionOS
- Status: Active
- Website: support.apple.com/messages

iMessage is an instant messaging service developed by Apple and launched on October 12, 2011. iMessage functions exclusively on Apple platforms, including iOS, iPadOS, macOS, watchOS, and visionOS. iMessage uses the Messages app client.

Core features of iMessage include sending text messages, images, videos, and arbitrary files to individual recipients and group chats; getting delivery and read statuses (read receipts); and end-to-end encryption so only the sender and recipient can read the messages. The service also allows sending location data and stickers. On iOS and iPadOS, third-party developers can extend iMessage capabilities with custom extensions.

iMessage was introduced with iOS 5 in 2011, and added to Macs with OS X Mountain Lion in 2012. In 2020, Apple introduced a redesigned Mac version of the Messages app with macOS Big Sur, adding some of the features previously unavailable on the Mac, such as location sharing and message effects.

== History ==
iMessage was announced by Scott Forstall at the WWDC 2011 keynote on June 6, 2011. A version of the Messages app for iOS with support for iMessage was included in the iOS 5 update on October 12, 2011. On February 16, 2012, Apple announced that a new Messages app would be part of OS X Mountain Lion, replacing iChat, and released a beta version of the Messages app the same day. Mountain Lion was released on July 25, 2012.

On October 23, 2012, Apple CEO Tim Cook announced that Apple device users had sent 300 billion messages using iMessage and that Apple delivered an average of 28,000 messages per second. In February 2016, Eddy Cue announced that the number of iMessages sent per second had grown to 200,000.

In May 2014, a lawsuit was filed against Apple over an issue where, if a user switched from an Apple device to a non-Apple device, messages being delivered to them through iMessage would not reach their destination. In November 2014 Apple addressed this problem by providing instructions and an online tool to deregister iMessage. A federal court dismissed the suit in Apple's favor.

On March 21, 2016, a group of Johns Hopkins University researchers published a report in which they demonstrated that an attacker in possession of iMessage ciphertexts could decrypt photos and videos that had been sent via the service. The researchers published their findings after Apple had patched the vulnerability.

On June 13, 2016, Apple announced the addition of Apps to the iMessage service, accessible via the Messages apps. Apps can create and share content, add stickers, make payments, and more within iMessage conversations without having to switch to standalone apps. One could develop standalone iMessage apps or an extension to existing iOS apps. Publishers can also create standalone stickers apps without writing any code. According to Sensor Tower, a data company that provides app store optimization services, as of March 2017 the iMessage App Store featured nearly 5,000 Message-enabled apps.

At the WWDC 2020 keynote on June 22, 2020, Apple previewed the next version of its macOS operating system, planned for release in late 2020. Big Sur shipped with a redesigned version of Messages, with features previously available only on iOS devices, such as message effects, memoji, stickers and location sharing.

On February 21, 2024, Apple announced that it would upgrade the iMessage protocol with a new post-quantum cryptographic (PQC) protocol called "PQ3". Apple said that, although quantum computers do not yet exist, it wanted to mitigate risk from future quantum computers as well as so-called "Harvest now, decrypt later" attack scenarios. Apple said it believed its PQ3 implementation provides protections that "surpass those in all other widely deployed messaging apps". Furthermore, because, according to Apple, there is no standard on security properties for messaging security levels that allow for easy comparison, Apple decided to create its own definitions consisting of 4 levels between 0 and 3. On this scale, Apple considers its PQ3 protocol to have "Level 3 security". The main differentiator of PQ3 compared to other PQC protocols is that it uses ongoing keying. Apple rolled out PQ3 with the public release of iOS 17.4, iPadOS 17.4, macOS 14.4, and watchOS 10.4, saying, "iMessage conversations between devices that support PQ3 are automatically ramping up to the post-quantum encryption protocol" and that PQ3 "will fully replace the existing protocol within all supported conversations [in 2024]."

=== Digital Markets Act (European Union) ===
In 2022, iMessage was included on a list of potential "gatekeeper services" to be regulated by new legislation in the European Union. This would have required iMessage to be interoperable with other messaging services that either serve a certain number of users or generates significant revenue. In September 2023, the Financial Times reported based on two sources with direct knowledge on the matter, that Apple appealed the inclusion of iMessage on the grounds that the iMessage userbase in Europe was not large enough to warrant labeling iMessage as a gatekeeper service. In December 2023, several media outlets reported that the appeal was successful. Bloomberg speculated that this "tentative" decision was reached because while iMessage's userbase is large enough to qualify, the service is not popular enough with businesses, specifically.

This rumored tentative decision was later formalized on February 13, 2024, when the European Commission announced that they had decided that, together with Bing, Edge and Microsoft Advertising, iMessage does not qualify as gatekeeper services. The European Commission did not go into detail on their decision beyond stating that it was the result of "a thorough assessment of all arguments, taking into account input by relevant stakeholders, and after hearing the Digital Markets Advisory Committee." Despite the lack of detail provided by the European Commission on their decision, multiple outlets speculated that the decision was indeed based on iMessage not meeting the threshold necessary to be classified as a gatekeeper service as was reported in the prior year.

This ultimately meant that Apple didn't have to make iMessage interoperable with other messaging services, nor did Apple have to conform to the other DMA regulations insofar it pertained to iMessage.

== Features ==
iMessage allows users to send texts, documents, photos, videos, contact information, and group messages over the Internet to other iOS, iPadOS, macOS, watchOS, or visionOS users. iMessage is an alternative to SMS, MMS, and RCS messaging for most users with devices running iOS 5 or later. The "Send as SMS" setting under Messages will cause the message to be sent via SMS if the sender does not have an active Internet connection. If the receiver has no Internet connection, the message should be stored on a server until a connection is restored.

iMessage is accessible through the Messages app on an iPhone, iPad or iPod Touch running iOS 5 or later, a Mac running OS X Mountain Lion or later or an Apple Vision Pro running any version of visionOS. Owners of these devices can register one or more email addresses with Apple. Additionally, iPhone owners can register their phone numbers with Apple, provided their carrier is supported. When a message is sent to a mobile number, Messages will check with Apple if the mobile number is set up for iMessage. If it is not, the message will seamlessly transition from iMessage to SMS.

In Messages, the user's sent communication is aligned to the right, with replies from other people on the left. A user can see if the other iMessage user is typing a message. A pale gray ellipsis appears in the text bubble of the other user when a reply is started. It is also possible to start a conversation on one iOS device and continue it on another. On iPhones, green buttons and text bubbles indicate SMS, MMS, or RCS communication; on all iOS devices, blue buttons and text bubbles indicate iMessage communication.

All iMessages are encrypted and can be tracked using delivery receipts. If the recipient enables Read Receipts, the sender will be able to see when the recipient has read the message. iMessage also allows users to set up chats with more than two people—a "group chat".

With the launch of iOS 10, users can send messages accompanied by a range of "bubble" or "screen" effects. By holding down the send button with force, the range of effects is surfaced for users to select from.

With the launches of iOS 14 and macOS 11 Big Sur, users gained several new features such as the ability to pin individual conversations, mention other users, set an image for group conversations, and send inline replies. Additionally, more of the features from the Messages app on iOS and iPadOS were ported over to their macOS counterpart.

With the launch of iOS 15.2, Apple added automated blurring of photos containing explicit images that are sent to underage users. The feature relies on scanning the photos on the device and can optionally be set to alert the underage user's parents if explicit material is received. The feature was originally launched only for the US with a later expansion to the UK, Canada, Australia and New Zealand. The feature remains regionally restricted for the rest of the world.

With the launch of iOS 16, Apple added the ability for users to edit and unsend sent iMessages. Users can unsend an iMessage for up to 2 minutes after it being sent, and can edit it for up to 15 minutes. Users also have the ability to recover deleted messages for up to 30 days.

With the launch of iOS 17, Apple added the safety feature "Check in" that shares the estimated time of arrival with a contact when traveling. Users also have the ability to send Live Stickers and Emoji Stickers.

With the launch of iOS 18, Apple added the ability for users to send messages with text formatting (bold, italics, underline and strike-through formatting), Animated Effects and Tapbacks with any Emoji or Sticker. Users can also schedule messages to be sent on a specified date and time in the future. On supported iPhones, users can now send messages via satellite when there is no cellular coverage available.

== Technology ==
The iMessage protocol is based on the Apple Push Notification service (APNs)—a proprietary, binary protocol. It sets up a Keep-Alive connection with the Apple servers. Every connection has its own unique code, which acts as an identifier for the route that should be used to send a message to a specific device. The connection is encrypted with TLS using a client-side certificate, that is requested by the device on the activation of iMessage.

Each message recipient's public keys are retrieved from Apple Identity Service (IDS), "Apple's directory of iMessage public keys, Apple Push Notification service (APNs) addresses, and phone numbers and email addresses that are used to look up the keys and device addresses." Each message is individually encrypted for each recipient device in a conversation. Message attachments are encrypted and uploaded to iCloud to be retrieved separately by the recipient. Messages are stored on Apple servers for up to 30 days.

== Platforms ==
iMessage is only officially available on Apple operating systems, such as iOS, iPadOS, macOS, watchOS and visionOS. Unlike some other messaging apps, it does not support Android or Microsoft Windows, and does not have any web access interface. There are independent apps that attempt to bring iMessage to other platforms.

In September 2013, an independent app called iMessage Chat was released on Google Play by the developer Daniel Zweigart (Huluwa). It connected to iMessage servers impersonating a Mac mini. The app required users to provide their Apple IDs and passwords, routing messages through a Chinese server, raising security and privacy concerns. iMessage Chat was later removed from the Play Store.

On May 3, 2016, an independent open-source project named "PieMessage" was announced by app developer Eric Chee, consisting of code for OS X that communicates with iMessage and connects to an Android client, allowing the Android client to send and receive messages. PieMessage has since been abandoned. Chee said, "I've moved onto other projects and haven't had time to finish this".

On December 10, 2017, an independent app called weMessage, developed by Roman Scott, was announced with a YouTube video. It was released for Android and required a Mac. The app uses a weServer app on a Mac, which takes iMessages that are delivered to a Mac and forwards them to an Android smartphone or tablet using accessibility features on the Mac that interact with the Messages app for the Mac. The app is no longer available on Google Play and has not been updated since 2019.

On February 23, 2019, an independent open-source app called "AirMessage" was announced by app developer Cole Feuer. This is done by routing messages through a Mac computer via the AirMessage server app, which acts as a relay server, connecting to Apple's iMessage network and back to the user's device. The app is available on the web and supports modern web browsers.

On November 28, 2020, an independent open-source app called BlueBubbles was announced by app developer Zach Shames. It uses a server app on a macOS device that communicates with the client apps and forwards messages to a client app available on Android, Windows, and Linux.

On December 5, 2023, an independent app called Beeper Mini, which used reverse engineering of the iMessage protocol, was released for Android. It quickly reached the top five free communications apps on Google Play and became the fastest-growing paid Android app in history, gaining more than 100,000 downloads in the first 48 hours. A few days after it launched, Apple briefly shut it down, but it resumed operations again. Amy Klobuchar and Mike Lee, who lead the Senate's antitrust committee, wrote the Department of Justice a letter expressing concern that Apple was not allowing competition. Beeper Mini's developers restored the service again, but Apple soon shut it down again. Ultimately, Beeper Mini's creators gave up on bypassing Apple's attempts to shut down the service and stopped trying to reverse-engineer iMessage.

== Reception ==
On November 12, 2012, Chetan Sharma, a technology and strategy consulting firm, published the US Mobile Data Market Update Q3 2012, noting the decline of text messaging in the United States, and suggested the decline may be attributed to Americans using alternative free messaging services such as iMessage.

In 2017, Google announced it would compete with iMessage with its own messaging service, Google Messages (formerly Android Messages).

=== Security and privacy ===
On November 4, 2014, the Electronic Frontier Foundation (EFF) listed iMessage on its "Secure Messaging Scorecard", giving it a score of 5 out of 7 points. It received points for having communications encrypted in transit, having communications encrypted with keys the provider does not have access to (end-to-end encryption), having past communications secure if the keys are stolen (forward secrecy), having their security designs well-documented, and having a recent independent security audit. It missed points because users can not verify contacts' identities and because the source code is not open to independent review. In September 2015, Matthew Green noted that, because iMessage does not display key fingerprints for out-of-band verification, users are unable to verify that a man-in-the-middle attack has not occurred. The post also noted that iMessage uses RSA key exchange. This means that, as opposed to what EFF's scorecard claims, iMessage does not feature forward secrecy.

On August 7, 2019, researchers from Project Zero presented 6 "interaction-less" exploits in iMessage that could be used to take over control of a user's device. These six exploits have been fixed in iOS 12.4, released on July 22, 2019, however there are still some undisclosed exploits which will be patched in a future update. Project Pegasus revelations in July 2021 found the software used iMessage exploits.

In 2021, an FBI document was obtained through an FOIA request by Property of the People, Inc., a 501(c)(3) nonprofit organization. The document says that WhatsApp and iMessage are vulnerable to law-enforcement real-time searches. Reuters also reported that Apple had had plans to encrypt iCloud backups of iMessage data, but dropped them after the FBI complained.

Eric Migicovsky, founder of third-party iMessage client Beeper Mini, has criticized Apple for preventing iMessage access on Android phones. Migicovsky argues that it is hypocritical of Apple to claim iMessage is private and secure while simultaneously allowing only SMS messages when communicating with users on non-Apple devices (such as Android), even when alternatives exist. Apple has implied that third-party applications like Beeper Mini are less secure because "techniques posed significant risks to user security and privacy, including the potential for metadata exposure and enabling unwanted messages, spam, and phishing attacks." All four of the security and privacy risks suggested by Apple's statement also apply to SMS, which iMessage uses for fallback when communicating with non-iMessage users. Apple has long resisted bringing iMessage to non-Apple devices, with CEO Tim Cook previously offering the solution "buy your mom an iPhone" when questioned at Code Conference about a better way to message with someone who uses Android. Of the conflict between Beeper Mini and Apple, Senator Elizabeth Warren tweeted: "Green bubble texts are less secure. So why would Apple block a new app allowing Android users to chat with iPhone users on iMessage? Big Tech executives are protecting profits by squashing competitors. Chatting between different platforms should be easy and secure."

=== Vendor lock-in ===
Media outlets have described iMessage as a means of achieving vendor lock-in.

=== Anti-SMS/MMS user sentiment ===
According to an autumn 2023 survey by Piper Sandler, 87% of US teenagers have iPhones. Claims have been made that the app's use of different colors for iMessage and SMS messages has contributed to social exclusion among some teens.

On November 16, 2023, Apple announced that Rich Communication Services (RCS) support would be coming to iOS the next year to be used as a fallback when iMessage is unavailable and the other user can use RCS. It confirmed that RCS messages would remain green. After the news broke, Google revealed that it would be working with Apple to implement RCS into iOS.

On September 16, 2024, Apple released iOS 18, which brought RCS to supported iOS devices.

On March 14, 2025, Apple announced that it would support the RCS Universal Profile 3.0 in "future software updates".
