= Messages (Apple) =

Instant messaging software application

- Developer: Apple
- Release: iOS: June 29, 2007; 19 years ago (as Text); June 17, 2009; 17 years ago (as Messages); macOS: July 25, 2012; 14 years ago; watchOS: April 24, 2015; 11 years ago; visionOS: February 2, 2024; 2 years ago
- Operating system: iOS; iPadOS; watchOS; macOS; visionOS
- Predecessor: iChat (macOS)
- Type: Instant messaging
- License: Freeware

Messages is a text messaging software application developed by Apple for its macOS, iOS, iPadOS, watchOS, and visionOS operating systems.

All versions of Messages support Apple's own iMessage and Apple Messages for Business services, while the mobile version of Messages on iOS – used on iPhone and cellular-enabled models of the iPad – also supports SMS, MMS, and RCS since iOS 18. Users can tell the difference between messages sent via carrier messaging (SMS/MMS/RCS) and messages sent over iMessage or Apple Messages for Business by the bubble color. The bubbles will appear either green for carrier messaging (SMS/MMS/RCS), blue for iMessage, or dark gray for Apple Messages for Business.

First released in 2007, the mobile version was known as Text prior to iPhone OS 3, while the desktop Messages application replaced iChat as the native OS X instant messaging client with the release of OS X Mountain Lion in 2012, bringing additional support for iMessage and FaceTime integration.

== Supported messaging services and protocols ==
Messages supports the iMessage, Apple Messages for Business, SMS and MMS protocols, and, as of iOS 18, Rich Communication Services (RCS) is also supported. Messages that are sent via SMS, MMS, or RCS appear in green bubbles, while messages sent via iMessage appear in blue bubbles, and messages sent via Apple Messages for Business appear in dark gray bubbles.

== iOS and iPadOS versions ==
The Text app debuted on iPhone OS 1.0 as a built-in app.

In iPhone OS 1.1.3, the ability to send messages to multiple numbers was added.

iPhone OS 2.1 added the ability to repeat message notifications up to two times.

With iPhone OS 3.0 on June 17, 2009, the Text application was renamed Messages, due to the addition of MMS protocol support, in addition to the previously available SMS protocol. The original iPhone did not receive support for MMS, citing hardware limitations. Messages also gained support for sharing contacts using the vCard standard. Other changes included support for copy and paste, and the ability to forward or delete multiple messages at a time.

Messages received minor improvements in iOS 4. Among the new features was the ability to search within text messages, much like the search feature in Mail. It also added support for displaying a character count to notify when one had gone over the standard SMS character limit. iOS 4.0 also included support for a red exclamation mark to appear on the app's icon to warn failure to send a message. Developers were provided with a new API that allowed them to add embedded messaging functionality to their apps.

iMessage support was added with iOS 5 on October 12, 2011. The iPhone supported SMS, MMS and iMessage, while the iPad and iPod touch only supported iMessage. With iMessage, users could send text, picture messages and contacts over WiFi or 3G to other iOS 5 devices without using their carrier quota. In addition, a user could start their conversation on one device and continue on another. Messages also introduced typing indication, delivery and read receipts. With the introduction of Notification Center, new SMS, and MMS notifications could now be seen on the lock screen or by pulling down the Notification Center, in addition to iMessage notifications.

iOS 6 improved syncing between multiple devices. iPod touch and iPad users could now use their iPhone phone numbers to send or receive iMessages. Earlier, iPhone users could not receive iMessages sent to their phone number on iPad or iPod touch. Users could now add additional emails to receive and send messages on any device. iOS 6 also added a Share button on apps like Safari and Photos, which enabled users to share links and photos using SMS/MMS or iMessage without leaving the app.

Messages gained a redesigned user interface in iOS 7. The ability to see a message post date by swiping from right to left was also added.

In iOS 7.1, the logo was slightly modified.

In iOS 8, users can send audio and video messages by holding down a new recording icon. In group conversations, users can remove/add someone to a thread, name a thread, share their location in a thread, view all attachments, and turn on Do Not Disturb to not receive notifications from a specific thread. As a part of the new continuity feature, users can now use their iPhones as a relay to send and receive SMS and MMS messages on Macs and iPads.

In iOS 9, the app received a redesigned overlay when sending an audio clip, as well as seeing contact photos in list view on iPhone 6 or later, the user can also search for text and have that text be highlighted (and scrolled).

In iOS 10, the app gained its own App Store allowing the user to download third-party apps that allow users to send stickers and play games within the app. It also received new visual effects, for example, chat bubbles with a "loud" or "gentle" effect.

In iOS 11, the app on the iPhone X introduced face-tracking emoji called "Animoji" (animated emoji), using Face ID. A new app drawer for iMessage was also added, and aims to simplify the experience of using apps and stickers, and an optimized storage system reduces the backup size of messages. The logo was also updated.

By the time of the iOS 11 release in September 2017, the feature was not present, having been removed in an earlier beta version, with Apple announcing the feature as "coming this fall with an update to iOS 11". It was launched a few days after the iOS 11.2 update went live, although initially only available in the United States.

The Messages app added a "Business Chat" feature for users to communicate directly with businesses through the app. It was later renamed "Apple Messages for Business." This can be accessed through various "entry points," including message buttons on a business's web site, tapping on phone numbers of a registered businesses, scanning QR codes, tapping on message buttons in a business's iOS app, and others. However, this feature was not included with the initial release of iOS 11 (instead launching with iOS 11.3).

The application gained the ability to synchronize messages across iOS and macOS through iCloud, reflecting message deletion across devices. This feature was temporarily removed in the fifth beta release and returned on May 29, 2018, when iOS 11.4 was released. At the time of the iOS 11 announcement in June 2017, Apple presented functionality letting users send person-to-person payments with Apple Pay through Messages.

In iOS 12, a new type of customizable Animoji called "Memoji" was introduced, which allows a user to create a 3D character of themselves. There are also new Koala, Tiger, Ghost, and T-Rex Animojis, while new text and GIF effects similar to those found on other social media applications and the performance of the app was increased.

In iOS 13, user profiles can be created and Memoji can be used as an iMessage profile picture. All iOS devices with an A9 processor or newer can create custom Memoji.

In iOS 13.2, the ability for Siri to announce Messages was added.

In iOS 14, users could now pin up to nine individual conversations above other message threads. Group chats using iMessage may be given a custom image, a Memoji, or an emoji. Users may now mention other users, and change notification settings to only be notified when explicitly mentioned. Messages may be replied to with inline replies, allowing for simultaneous conversation threads and see the replies in the general conversation or as a separate thread. SMS filter: third-party apps that filter unwanted SMS from unknown senders can show the custom categories with which they classify these messages (e.g. transactions, promotions, spam) directly in the Messages app.

In iOS 15, a new feature called "Shared with You" was added, which organizes links and other content shared through Messages in a dedicated section in their native apps for later viewing.

In iOS 15.2, automated blurring was added to iMessages of photos containing explicit content sent to underage users. The feature relies on scanning the photos on the device and can optionally be set to alert the underage user's parents if explicit material is received. The feature was originally launched only for the US with a later expansion to the UK, Canada, Australia and New Zealand. The feature remains regionally restricted for the rest of the world.

In iOS 16, a few new features were added. Sent messages can now be edited within 15 minutes and can be deleted within 2 minutes. SharePlay is now available in the Messages app to watch a movie or listen to music with friends, without requiring them to make a FaceTime call. The ability to recover deleted messages for up to 30 days was added. The ability to invite someone to work on a project, so that every time someone edits a shared document, the user receives updates in a thread of the Messages app. It works with iOS apps such as Files, Keynote, Numbers, Pages, Notes, Reminders, Safari, and third-party apps designed to take advantage of this Collaboration feature. On audio messages previously sent or received, users can swipe with the finger on the sound wave graph to position at the exact point. The Ability to report SMS/MMS junk to carriers was also added.

In iOS 17, there is a new "Check In" feature which allows the user to pick a location and Check In notifies the contact once the user reaches the destination safely. If the user stops moving towards the destination and does not respond to prompts, the user's location, route, and battery level are automatically shared with the contact. The contact otherwise has no access to the user's location, and this information is end-to-end encrypted.

On February 21, 2024, Apple announced that they were going to upgrade the iMessage protocol with a new post-quantum cryptographic (PQC) protocol called "PQ3." Apple stated that, although quantum computers don't exist yet, they wanted to mitigate risks from future quantum computers as well as so-called "Harvest now, decrypt later" attack scenarios. Apple stated that they believe their PQ3 implementation provides protections that "surpass those in all other widely deployed messaging apps." Furthermore, because, according to Apple, there is no standard on security properties for messaging security levels that allow for easy comparison, Apple decided to create their own definitions consisting of 4 levels between 0 and 3. On this scale, Apple considers its PQ3 protocol to reach what Apple calls "Level 3 security". The main differentiator of PQ3, compared to other PQC protocols, is that PQ3 utilizes ongoing keying. Apple rolled out PQ3 with the public release of iOS 17.4, iPadOS 17.4, macOS 14.4 and watchOS 10.4, stating that “iMessage conversations between devices that support PQ3 are automatically ramping up to the post-quantum encryption protocol” and that PQ3 "will fully replace the existing protocol within all supported conversations [in 2024]."

In iOS 18, RCS support was added. Messages sent with RCS appear in green, and a label denoting that the message is being sent with RCS is visible in the composer box. The logo was also updated. Users can also have artificial intelligence make emojis for them, called Genmoji.

In iOS 26, the Messages app received a design overhaul, along with other first party apps with Liquid Glass, as well as features like backgrounds, polls, live translation, message filtering and selecting a portion of a text. Backgrounds set can be seen and changed by everyone.

== watchOS version ==
Apple Watches can send and receive SMS and MMS messages through a paired iPhone, while iMessages can be sent and received over Wi-Fi without a paired iPhone. As the Apple Watch has no keyboard, users can respond to messages using preset replies or text transcribed by Siri. Apple Watch can also send emojis, audio recordings, and hand-drawn "scribbles".

== visionOS version ==
Launched on the Apple Vision Pro on February 2, 2024, the Vision Pro comes with the Messages app pre-installed, allowing users on visionOS to send and receive messages, emojis, stickers, and media with the iMessage protocol, just as they can do on iOS or macOS. Users can create messages with their voice, a virtual keyboard, or a Bluetooth connected keyboard.

== macOS version ==
Messages was announced for OS X as a beta application on February 16, 2012 for Macs running Mac OS X 10.7 "Lion". The stable release of Messages was released on July 25, 2012 with OS X Mountain Lion, replacing iChat. In addition to supporting Apple's new iMessage protocol, Messages retained its support for AIM, Yahoo Messenger, Google Talk and Jabber.

Messages uses the newly added Notification Center to notify the user of incoming messages. The introduction of a new Share button in applications like Safari, Finder and Preview gave users the ability to share links to webpages, photos, and files. Messages also supported dragging and dropping files and photos for sharing. It also supports video calling through Apple's FaceTime and the third-party IM services it supports.

With the release of OS X Mountain Lion 10.8.2, Messages gained the ability to send and receive iMessages using an iPhone phone number.

OS X Mavericks added the ability to respond to messages from the Notification Center.

OS X Mavericks 10.9.2 added the option to block users in iMessage.

Messages received a major redesign in OS X Yosemite, following the flat design aesthetic. As a part of the new Continuity feature, users can send and receive SMS and MMS messages through paired iPhones running iOS 8 or later.

OS X El Capitan added multi-touch gestures to the app that allows a user to delete or mark emails or conversations by swiping a finger on a multi-touch device, such as a trackpad. OS X also analyzes the contents of individual emails in Mail and uses the gathered information in other applications, such as Calendar. For example, an invitation in Mail can automatically be added as a Calendar event.

The Messages app gained a few new features in MacOS Sierra. Aesthetic effects are introduced to messages, such as three times bigger emojis and click back with hearts or thumbs-up on a message bubble. The ability to play YouTube videos and preview links in a conversation was introduced. Users can view interactive content added to iMessage in iOS 10. The app also allows you to turn on or off read receipts on a conversation by conversation basis.

macOS High Sierra drops support for the AIM protocol.

The release of macOS High Sierra 10.13.5 introduced support for Messages in iCloud. This feature allows messages to sync across all devices using the same iCloud account. When messages are deleted they are deleted on each device as well, and messages stored in the cloud do not take up local storage on the device anymore. In order to use the feature, the user has to enable two-factor authentication for their Apple ID.

In macOS Mojave, support for the Jabber protocol was removed.

In macOS Catalina, the microphone feature received a redesigned icon.

macOS Big Sur dropped the original codebase in favor of porting the iOS version using Catalyst. It also brought features from earlier iOS version that had not been added to Mac, as well as some new ones; conversation pinning, the ability to mention individuals, message searching, and more tools to send messages such as Memoji.

macOS Monterey introduced a few new features, also introduced in iOS 15, such as "Shared with You" which provides shortcut links to content shared via Messages in other Apple apps such as Safari, Photos, Music, and News. When multiple photos are sent/received, they are now displayed as a collection instead of multiple messages. A download button is provided to download all photos simultaneously.

Users received the ability to undo or edit messages in macOS Ventura, a carryover from iOS 16.

In macOS Sonoma, the app received a few changes. More precise search filters: for example, the contact name can be combined with a search term to look for the term within a specific conversation. A new feature called Catch-up, witch lets the user quickly jump to the first unread message in a conversation. Tapback was redesigned into multiple icons instead of being a context menu, while iMessage stickers were given a new selection interface.

== Reception ==
=== Praise ===
As a headlining feature in iOS 5, Messages was widely reviewed and was met with fairly positive reviews.

Dante Cesa from Engadget, in his review, praised the "brilliance" in Apple's execution of Messages. He complimented the way Messages did not change the earlier SMS UI and would automatically convert an SMS/MMS to iMessage if the recipient was registered; and from iMessage to SMS/MMS if they stopped using the service. Dan Moren from Macworld was also in praise of Apple execution saying that "...there's no having to explain to your less technically savvy friends how they can send you a free message instead of an SMS; it's all done automatically." This feature was widely praised.

AnandTech praised Apple's technical achievements with Messages, particularly with iMessage. They noted that doing away with SMS's character limits (140 or 160) helped eliminate messages being sent and received split up into two or more messages. In their tests they found that Apple actually prioritized using cellular networks to send text messages as opposed to WiFi networks in spite of possibly incurring data costs. They claimed that data usage with text based iMessage was small enough to ignore especially when it is considered that cellular networks are more secure than WiFi (protected or not). With picture or video messages, Apple prioritized WiFi given the much higher data consumption as compared to text.

=== Criticism ===
Most of the criticism for Messages relates to iMessage. Before the release of iOS 6 and OS X Mountain Lion (10.8.2), the inability to receive iMessages sent to iPhone phone numbers on the iPad, iPod touch, and Mac was criticized. This feature was addressed in iOS 6 for iPhones, iPads and iPod touches and OS X 10.8.2 for Macs.

Messages also came under fire due to multiple cases of Apple's iCloud service going down. Messages relies on iCloud to send and receive iMessages.

Apple famously refused to adopt the RCS texting standard within Messages. In 2022, an iPhone user during an event asked Tim Cook if there were any plans to adopt RCS within the Messages app and iPhone. Cook explained that the majority of iPhone users simply were not expressing interest in RCS coming to iPhone and Messages. The person then followed that question up, explaining that their mother uses an Android phone whilst they use an iPhone, to which Cook jokingly replied "Buy your mom an iPhone" to massive controversy. This dialog and quote was later referenced in an anti-trust lawsuit against Apple Inc. filed by the United States Department of Justice. Google ran an advertising campaign known as "Get The Message", pressuring Apple to implement RCS within iOS. It encouraged social networking users to share the hashtag "#GetTheMessage" with a link to the Get The Message homepage with information about RCS. Several Android OEMs joined the campaign and created their own advertisements, such as Samsung. RCS later came to Messages in iOS 18.

== Accessibility ==
Using Apple's VoiceOver screen reader (on both iOS and macOS), visually impaired users can tap on a message and have it be read out to them. They can also navigate the Messages UI using Voice Over. Utilizing Siri with Messages enables one to dictate and send messages with just a few commands. Siri is also able to read out new incoming messages. The default font size on iOS Messages is editable under the Accessibility tab in the Settings application.

== See also ==
- Comparison of cross-platform instant messaging clients
- Comparison of instant messaging protocols
- Comparison of Internet Relay Chat clients
- Comparison of LAN messengers
- Comparison of VoIP software
- List of SIP software
- List of video telecommunication services and product brands
