= Comparison of cross-platform instant messaging clients =

The landscape for instant messaging involves cross-platform instant messaging clients that can handle one or multiple protocols. Clients that use the same protocol can typically federate and talk to one another. The following table compares general and technical information for cross-platform instant messaging clients in active development, each of which have their own article that provide further information.

== General ==
Client	Developer	Initial release	Platform	Latest release		License (client)	License (server)	Monthly active users
Client	Developer	Initial release	Platform	Version	Date	License (client)	License (server)	Monthly active users
BBM Enterprise	Blackberry	June 2014; 12 years ago	iOS, Android			Proprietary freeware	Proprietary	
Beeper	Nova Technology, Inc.; Beeper, Inc.; Automattic	May 10, 2021; 5 years ago	Android; ChromeOS; iOS; Linux; macOS; Windows			Apache-2.0	Apache-2.0	
Briar		May 9, 2018; 8 years ago	Android	1.5.9	2024-01-16	GPL-3.0-or-later	Not applicable (peer-to-peer over Bluetooth, WiFi, or Tor network)	
Conversations	Daniel Gultsch	March 24, 2014; 12 years ago	Android	2.20.2	2026-09-09	GPL-3.0-only	XMPP protocol	
Discord	Discord Inc.	March 6, 2015; 11 years ago	Android	269.11	2025-03-10	Proprietary freeware	Proprietary	150 million (2021)
Discord	Discord Inc.	March 6, 2015; 11 years ago	iOS	270.0	2025-03-10	Proprietary freeware	Proprietary	150 million (2021)
Discord	Discord Inc.	March 6, 2015; 11 years ago	Linux	0.0.88	2025	Proprietary freeware	Proprietary	150 million (2021)
Discord	Discord Inc.	March 6, 2015; 11 years ago	macOS	0.0.270	2022-12-12	Proprietary freeware	Proprietary	150 million (2021)
Discord	Discord Inc.	March 6, 2015; 11 years ago	Windows	1.0.9166	2024-10-08	Proprietary freeware	Proprietary	150 million (2021)
Element	New Vector Limited	July 2016; 10 years ago	Android			AGPL-3.0	Matrix protocol	43 million (2021)
Element	New Vector Limited	July 2016; 10 years ago	iOS			AGPL-3.0	Matrix protocol	43 million (2021)
Element	New Vector Limited	July 2016; 10 years ago	Linux			AGPL-3.0	Matrix protocol	43 million (2021)
Element	New Vector Limited	July 2016; 10 years ago	macOS			AGPL-3.0	Matrix protocol	43 million (2021)
Element	New Vector Limited	July 2016; 10 years ago	Windows			AGPL-3.0	Matrix protocol	43 million (2021)
Element	New Vector Limited	July 2016; 10 years ago	Web			AGPL-3.0	Matrix protocol	43 million (2021)
Fluxer	Fluxer Platform AB	January 2026; 9 months ago	Linux; Windows; macOS; Android; iOS; Web			AGPLv3	AGPLv3	
Fractal		March 16, 2018; 8 years ago	Linux desktops and mobile OSs			GPLv3	Matrix protocol	
Gadu-Gadu	Łukasz Foltyn, GG Network S.A.	August 15, 2000; 26 years ago				Proprietary freeware	Proprietary	
Gajim	Yann Le Boulanger	May 21, 2004; 22 years ago	BSD	2.6.0	2026-08-27	GPL-3.0-only	XMPP protocol	
Gajim	Yann Le Boulanger	May 21, 2004; 22 years ago	Linux	2.6.0	2026-08-27	GPL-3.0-only	XMPP protocol	
Gajim	Yann Le Boulanger	May 21, 2004; 22 years ago	macOS	2.6.0	2026-08-27	GPL-3.0-only	XMPP protocol	
Gajim	Yann Le Boulanger	May 21, 2004; 22 years ago	Windows	2.6.0	2026-08-27	GPL-3.0-only	XMPP protocol	
Gitter	New Vector Ltd	February 13, 2023; 3 years ago	Web, Windows, Mac, iOS, Android, Linux			MIT License	Apache-2.0 (Synapse)	
Google Chat (formerly Google Hangouts)	Google	May 15, 2013; 13 years ago (as Google Hangouts) March 9, 2017; 9 years ago (as Google Chat)	Android			Proprietary freeware	Proprietary	1 billion (2021) 500 million active (2020)
Google Chat (formerly Google Hangouts)	Google	May 15, 2013; 13 years ago (as Google Hangouts) March 9, 2017; 9 years ago (as Google Chat)	iOS			Proprietary freeware	Proprietary	1 billion (2021) 500 million active (2020)
Google Chat (formerly Google Hangouts)	Google	May 15, 2013; 13 years ago (as Google Hangouts) March 9, 2017; 9 years ago (as Google Chat)	Web			Proprietary freeware	Proprietary	1 billion (2021) 500 million active (2020)
Google Messages (RCS)	Google	2018; 8 years ago	Android			Proprietary freeware	Proprietary	1 billion (2021) 500 million active (2020)
Google Messages (RCS)	Google	2018; 8 years ago	Web			Proprietary freeware	Proprietary	1 billion (2021) 500 million active (2020)
Google Messages (RCS)	Google	2018; 8 years ago	Wear OS			Proprietary freeware	Proprietary	1 billion (2021) 500 million active (2020)
ICQ	Mail.Ru	November 1996; 29 years ago				Proprietary adware freemium	Proprietary	Defunct
Jami	Savoir-faire Linux	December 23, 2004; 21 years ago	Android			GPL-3.0-or-later	Not applicable (peer-to-peer)	
Jami	Savoir-faire Linux	December 23, 2004; 21 years ago	iOS			GPL-3.0-or-later	Not applicable (peer-to-peer)	
Jami	Savoir-faire Linux	December 23, 2004; 21 years ago	Linux			GPL-3.0-or-later	Not applicable (peer-to-peer)	
Jami	Savoir-faire Linux	December 23, 2004; 21 years ago	macOS			GPL-3.0-or-later	Not applicable (peer-to-peer)	
Jami	Savoir-faire Linux	December 23, 2004; 21 years ago	Windows			GPL-3.0-or-later	Not applicable (peer-to-peer)	
Jitsi	Emil Ivov	2003; 23 years ago	Desktop	2.10.5550	2017-10-01	Apache-2.0	Apache-2.0	20 million (2020)
KakaoTalk	Kakao Corp.	March 18, 2010; 16 years ago				Proprietary freeware	Proprietary	47 million (2021)
Keet								
Kik Messenger	Medialab	October 2010; 16 years ago	Android	17.3.1.31975	2025-01-20	Proprietary adware freemium	Proprietary	15 million (2017)
Kik Messenger	Medialab	October 2010; 16 years ago	iOS	17.4.0	2025-01-13	Proprietary adware freemium	Proprietary	15 million (2017)
Line	LY Corporation	March 2012; 14 years ago	Android	26.6.1	2026-05-07	Proprietary freemium	Proprietary	169 million (2020)
Line	LY Corporation	March 2012; 14 years ago	iOS	26.6.0	2026-05-07	Proprietary freemium	Proprietary	169 million (2020)
Line	LY Corporation	March 2012; 14 years ago	Chrome	3.7.2	2026-02-24	Proprietary freemium	Proprietary	169 million (2020)
Line	LY Corporation	March 2012; 14 years ago	macOS	26.1.0	2026-03-03	Proprietary freemium	Proprietary	169 million (2020)
Line	LY Corporation	March 2012; 14 years ago	Windows	9.8.0.3597	2025-09-26	Proprietary freemium	Proprietary	169 million (2020)
Linphone	Belledonne Communications	2001; 25 years ago	Android	4.5.6	2021-11-08	GPL-3.0-or-later or proprietary	SIP protocol, could connect to any SIP provider/server, including Linphone's service	only for SIP linphone service : over 700,000 in 2024
Linphone	Belledonne Communications	2001; 25 years ago	iOS	4.5.1	2021-10-08	GPL-3.0-or-later or proprietary	SIP protocol, could connect to any SIP provider/server, including Linphone's service	only for SIP linphone service : over 700,000 in 2024
Linphone	Belledonne Communications	2001; 25 years ago	Linux	5.2.4	2024-04-11	GPL-3.0-or-later or proprietary	SIP protocol, could connect to any SIP provider/server, including Linphone's service	only for SIP linphone service : over 700,000 in 2024
Linphone	Belledonne Communications	2001; 25 years ago	macOS	5.2.4	2024-04-11	GPL-3.0-or-later or proprietary	SIP protocol, could connect to any SIP provider/server, including Linphone's service	only for SIP linphone service : over 700,000 in 2024
Linphone	Belledonne Communications	2001; 25 years ago	Windows	5.2.4	2024-04-11	GPL-3.0-or-later or proprietary	SIP protocol, could connect to any SIP provider/server, including Linphone's service	only for SIP linphone service : over 700,000 in 2024
Linphone	Belledonne Communications	2001; 25 years ago	BSD				SIP protocol, could connect to any SIP provider/server, including Linphone's service	only for SIP linphone service : over 700,000 in 2024
Mattermost	Mattermost Inc	2015; 11 years ago	Android			Apache-2.0	MIT license binary, AGPLv3 for source code, Apache-2.0 for admin tools and config files	
Mattermost	Mattermost Inc	2015; 11 years ago	iOS			Apache-2.0	MIT license binary, AGPLv3 for source code, Apache-2.0 for admin tools and config files	
Mattermost	Mattermost Inc	2015; 11 years ago	Linux			Apache-2.0	MIT license binary, AGPLv3 for source code, Apache-2.0 for admin tools and config files	
Mattermost	Mattermost Inc	2015; 11 years ago	macOS			Apache-2.0	MIT license binary, AGPLv3 for source code, Apache-2.0 for admin tools and config files	
Mattermost	Mattermost Inc	2015; 11 years ago	Windows			Apache-2.0	MIT license binary, AGPLv3 for source code, Apache-2.0 for admin tools and config files	
Messenger	Meta Platforms	August 9, 2011; 15 years ago	Android			Proprietary freeware	Proprietary	988 million (2022)
Messenger	Meta Platforms	August 9, 2011; 15 years ago	iOS			Proprietary freeware	Proprietary	988 million (2022)
Messenger	Meta Platforms	August 9, 2011; 15 years ago	macOS			Proprietary freeware	Proprietary	988 million (2022)
Messenger	Meta Platforms	August 9, 2011; 15 years ago	Windows			Proprietary freeware	Proprietary	988 million (2022)
Movim	Timothée Jaussoin	March 3, 2011; 15 years ago	Any, Progressive web application	0.35.1	2026-09-21	AGPL-3.0-or-later	XMPP protocol	
Mumble		September 22, 2005; 21 years ago	Linux, Microsoft Windows, macOS, Android, iOS	1.4.287	2022-09-14	3-clause BSD	Open source	
Olvid								
Palringo	Palringo Ltd	2006; 20 years ago	Android	10.14	2021-11-29	Proprietary freemium	Proprietary	
Palringo	Palringo Ltd	2006; 20 years ago	iOS	10.13.1	2021-10-19	Proprietary freemium	Proprietary	
Paltalk	AVM Software, Inc	June 1998; 28 years ago				Proprietary freeware	Proprietary	5.5 million (2013)
Pidgin	Mark Spencer	November 1998; 27 years ago	BSD	2.14.14	2025-01-23	GPL-2.0-or-later	Umpteen, both open protocols and interfaces with proprietary messengers	
Pidgin	Mark Spencer	November 1998; 27 years ago	Linux	2.14.14	2025-01-23	GPL-2.0-or-later	Umpteen, both open protocols and interfaces with proprietary messengers	
Pidgin	Mark Spencer	November 1998; 27 years ago	macOS	2.14.14	2025-01-23	GPL-2.0-or-later	Umpteen, both open protocols and interfaces with proprietary messengers	
Pidgin	Mark Spencer	November 1998; 27 years ago	Windows	2.14.14	2025-01-23	GPL-2.0-or-later	Umpteen, both open protocols and interfaces with proprietary messengers	
Psi	Psi and Psi+ developers	2001; 25 years ago	Linux	1.5	2020-09-06	GPL-2.0-or-later	XMPP protocol	
Psi	Psi and Psi+ developers	2001; 25 years ago	macOS	1.5	2020-09-06	GPL-2.0-or-later	XMPP protocol	
Psi	Psi and Psi+ developers	2001; 25 years ago	Windows	1.5	2020-09-06	GPL-2.0-or-later	XMPP protocol	
QQ	Tencent Holdings	February 10, 1999; 27 years ago	Android	9.2.10	2025-08-20	Proprietary adware	Proprietary	597 million (2023)
QQ	Tencent Holdings	February 10, 1999; 27 years ago	iOS, iPadOS, watchOS	9.2.12	2025-08-28	Proprietary adware	Proprietary	597 million (2023)
QQ	Tencent Holdings	February 10, 1999; 27 years ago	Windows	9.9.21	2025-09-04	Proprietary adware	Proprietary	597 million (2023)
QQ	Tencent Holdings	February 10, 1999; 27 years ago	macOS	6.9.79	2025-08-20	Proprietary adware	Proprietary	597 million (2023)
QQ	Tencent Holdings	February 10, 1999; 27 years ago	Linux	3.2.19	2025-08-20	Proprietary adware	Proprietary	597 million (2023)
RetroShare	Cyril Soler, Gioacchino Mazzurco	2006; 20 years ago		0.6.7	2023-11-30	GPL	Not applicable (peer-to-peer)	
Ricochet	Invisible.im	June 2014; 12 years ago	FreeBSD	1.1.4 (fork took over development, now at 3.0.15)	2016-11-07	BSD-3-Clause	Not applicable (peer-to-peer over the Tor network)	
Ricochet	Invisible.im	June 2014; 12 years ago	Linux	1.1.4 (fork took over development, now at 3.0.15)	2016-11-07	BSD-3-Clause	Not applicable (peer-to-peer over the Tor network)	
Ricochet	Invisible.im	June 2014; 12 years ago	macOS	1.1.4 (fork took over development, now at 3.0.15)	2016-11-07	BSD-3-Clause	Not applicable (peer-to-peer over the Tor network)	
Ricochet	Invisible.im	June 2014; 12 years ago	Windows	1.1.4 (fork took over development, now at 3.0.15)	2016-11-07	BSD-3-Clause	Not applicable (peer-to-peer over the Tor network)	
Session	Session Technology Foundation (STF)	February 2020; 6 years ago	Android iOS Microsoft Windows macOS Linux	Funding needed to keep active		BSD-3-Clause; MIT; GPL-3.0	BSD-3-Clause; MIT; GPL-3.0	
Signal	Signal Foundation	July 2014; 12 years ago	Android	8.26.4	2026-09-09	GPL-3.0-only	AGPL-3.0-only	40 million (2021)
Signal	Signal Foundation	July 2014; 12 years ago	iOS	8.30	2026-09-23	GPL-3.0-only	AGPL-3.0-only	40 million (2021)
Signal	Signal Foundation	July 2014; 12 years ago	Desktop	8.28.0	2026-09-23	AGPL-3.0-only	AGPL-3.0-only	40 million (2021)
Skype	Skype Technologies, a subsidiary of Microsoft Corporation	2003; 23 years ago				Proprietary adware freemium	Proprietary	Defunct
Slack	Slack Technologies	August 2013; 13 years ago				Proprietary freemium	Proprietary	12 million (2019)
Snapchat	Snap Inc.	November 2011; 14 years ago	Android	13.31.1.0	2025-03-08	Proprietary freeware	Proprietary	557 million (2022)
Snapchat	Snap Inc.	November 2011; 14 years ago	iOS	13.31.0.47	2025-03-05	Proprietary freeware	Proprietary	557 million (2022)
Surespot	Surespot LLC	2013; 13 years ago	Android			GPL-3.0-or-later + freemium		Defunct
Surespot	Surespot LLC	2013; 13 years ago	iOS			GPL-3.0-or-later + freemium		Defunct
TeamNote	TeamNote Limited	2012; 14 years ago				Subscription	Proprietary	
Telegram	Telegram Messenger LLP	2013; 13 years ago	Android	12.8.1	2026-06-11	GPL-2.0-or-later	Proprietary	700 million (2022)900 million (2024)
Telegram	Telegram Messenger LLP	2013; 13 years ago	iOS, iPadOS	12.8	2026-06-09	GPL-2.0-or-later	Proprietary	700 million (2022)900 million (2024)
Telegram	Telegram Messenger LLP	2013; 13 years ago	Desktop	6.9.1	2026-06-09	GPL-3.0-or-later	Proprietary	700 million (2022)900 million (2024)
Telegram	Telegram Messenger LLP	2013; 13 years ago	macOS	12.8	2026-06-10	GPL-2.0-or-later	Proprietary	700 million (2022)900 million (2024)
Threema	Threema GmbH	December 2012; 13 years ago	Android	6.5.3-1216	2026-09-23	AGPL-3.0-only	Proprietary	10 million (2021)
Threema	Threema GmbH	December 2012; 13 years ago	iOS	7.0.4	2026-03-15	AGPL-3.0-only	Proprietary	10 million (2021)
Threema	Threema GmbH	December 2012; 13 years ago	Web			AGPL-3.0-or-later	Proprietary	10 million (2021)
Trillian	Cerulean Studios	July 1, 2000; 26 years ago	Android	6.6.0.13	2023-07-25	Proprietary adware freemium	Proprietary	
Trillian	Cerulean Studios	July 1, 2000; 26 years ago	iOS	6.6.77	2024-09-13	Proprietary adware freemium	Proprietary	
Trillian	Cerulean Studios	July 1, 2000; 26 years ago	Linux	6.3.0.1	2020-05-27	Proprietary adware freemium	Proprietary	
Trillian	Cerulean Studios	July 1, 2000; 26 years ago	macOS	6.6.0.18	2024-11-20	Proprietary adware freemium	Proprietary	
Trillian	Cerulean Studios	July 1, 2000; 26 years ago	Windows	6.5.0.45	2024-09-04	Proprietary adware freemium	Proprietary	
Trillian	Cerulean Studios	July 1, 2000; 26 years ago	Web	6.6.19	2024-04-30	Proprietary adware freemium	Proprietary	
Viber	Rakuten Viber	December 2, 2010; 15 years ago	Android	20.4.3.0	2023-07-02	Proprietary freemium	Proprietary	260 million (2019)
Viber	Rakuten Viber	December 2, 2010; 15 years ago	iOS	20.4.0	2023-07-04	Proprietary freemium	Proprietary	260 million (2019)
Viber	Rakuten Viber	December 2, 2010; 15 years ago	Linux	20.3.0.1	2023-06-14	Proprietary freemium	Proprietary	260 million (2019)
Viber	Rakuten Viber	December 2, 2010; 15 years ago	macOS	20.2.0	2023-06-12	Proprietary freemium	Proprietary	260 million (2019)
Viber	Rakuten Viber	December 2, 2010; 15 years ago	Windows	20.4.0.0	2023-06-30	Proprietary freemium	Proprietary	260 million (2019)
Voxt.ai	Actual Chat, Inc.	March 2, 2023; 3 years ago	Android		13 February 2026	AGPL-3.0-only	AGPL-3.0-only	
Voxt.ai	Actual Chat, Inc.	March 2, 2023; 3 years ago	iOS		13 February 2026	AGPL-3.0-only	AGPL-3.0-only	
Voxt.ai	Actual Chat, Inc.	March 2, 2023; 3 years ago	Web		13 February 2026	AGPL-3.0-only	AGPL-3.0-only	
Voxt.ai	Actual Chat, Inc.	March 2, 2023; 3 years ago	Windows		13 February 2026	AGPL-3.0-only	AGPL-3.0-only	
WeChat	Tencent Holdings Limited	January 21, 2011; 15 years ago				Proprietary freeware	Proprietary	1.263 billion (2022)
WhatsApp	Meta Platforms	January 2009; 17 years ago	Android	2.26.37.71	2026-09-18	Proprietary freeware	Proprietary	2 billion (2020), confirmed in 2024
WhatsApp	Meta Platforms	January 2009; 17 years ago	iOS	26.37.73	2026-09-21	Proprietary freeware	Proprietary	2 billion (2020), confirmed in 2024
WhatsApp	Meta Platforms	January 2009; 17 years ago	macOS	26.37.73	2026-09-21	Proprietary freeware	Proprietary	2 billion (2020), confirmed in 2024
WhatsApp	Meta Platforms	January 2009; 17 years ago	Windows	2.2636.100.0	2026-09-17	Proprietary freeware	Proprietary	2 billion (2020), confirmed in 2024
Wire	Wire Swiss GmbH	December 3, 2014; 11 years ago	Android	4.15.4	2025-10-16	GPL-3.0-or-later	AGPL-3.0-or-later	20 million
Wire	Wire Swiss GmbH	December 3, 2014; 11 years ago	iOS	4.12.2	2026-01-21	GPL-3.0-or-later	AGPL-3.0-or-later	20 million
Wire	Wire Swiss GmbH	December 3, 2014; 11 years ago	Linux	3.40.3882	2025-12-10	GPL-3.0-or-later	AGPL-3.0-or-later	20 million
Wire	Wire Swiss GmbH	December 3, 2014; 11 years ago	macOS	3.40.5442	2025-12-10	GPL-3.0-or-later	AGPL-3.0-or-later	20 million
Wire	Wire Swiss GmbH	December 3, 2014; 11 years ago	Windows	3.40.5233	2025-12-10	GPL-3.0-or-later	AGPL-3.0-or-later	20 million
Wire	Wire Swiss GmbH	December 3, 2014; 11 years ago	Web	Webapp-2026-01	2026-01-27	GPL-3.0-or-later	AGPL-3.0-or-later	20 million
Client	Developer	Initial release	Platform	Latest release		License (client)	License (server)	Monthly active users
Client	Developer	Initial release	Platform	Version	Date	License (client)	License (server)	Monthly active users

== Operating system support ==
Operating system support for messaging clients
Client	Windows	macOS	Linux	Web	Android	iOS	iPadOS
Beeper	Yes	Yes	Yes	No	Yes	Yes	
Briar	No	No	Yes	No	Yes	No	
Discord	Yes	Yes	Yes	Yes	Yes	Yes	Yes
Element	Yes	Yes	Yes	Yes	Yes	Yes	Yes
Fluxer	Yes	Yes	Yes	Yes	Yes	Yes	Yes
Fractal	No	Yes	Yes	No	Yes	Yes	
Gadu-Gadu	Yes	Yes	Yes	Yes	Yes	Yes	
Gajim	Yes	Yes	Yes	Yes	Yes	Yes	
Gitter	Yes	No	Yes	No	No	No	
Google Chat	No	No	No	Yes	Yes	Yes	Yes
Google Messages (RCS)	No (Note: In addition to other official and third-party solutions, a native desktop application can be generated for the instant messaging app website using Nativefier.)	No	Needs third-party client	Yes	Included	No	No
ICQ	Yes	Yes	Yes	Yes	Yes	Yes	
Jami	Yes	Yes	Yes	Yes	Yes	Yes	
Jitsi	Yes	Yes	Yes	Yes	Yes	Yes	
KakaoTalk	Yes	Yes	No	No	Yes	Yes	Yes
Kik Messenger	No	No	No	No	Yes	Yes	
Line	Yes	Yes	As browser extension	No	Yes	Yes	Yes
Linphone	Yes	Yes	Yes	No	Yes	Yes	
Mattermost	Yes	Yes	Yes	Yes	Yes	Yes	
Messages (Apple)	No	Included	No	No	No	Included	Yes
Messenger	Yes	Yes	Needs third-party client	Yes	Yes	Yes	Yes
Mumble	Yes	Yes	Yes		Yes	Yes	
Movim	Yes	Yes	Yes	Yes	Yes	Yes	
Palringo	No	No	No	No	Yes	Yes	
Paltalk	Yes	Yes	No	No	Yes	Yes	
Pidgin	Yes	Yes	Yes	No	No	No	
Psi	Yes	Yes	Yes	No	No	No	
RetroShare	Yes	Yes	Yes	No	Yes	No	
Ricochet	Yes	Yes	Yes	No	No	No	
Session	Yes	Yes	Yes	No	Yes	Yes	
Signal	Yes	Yes	Yes	No	Yes	Yes	Yes
Skype	Included	Yes	Yes	Yes	Yes	Yes	Yes
Slack	Yes	Yes	Yes	Yes	Yes	Yes	
Snapchat	No	No	No	No	Yes	Yes	Yes
Surespot	No	No	No	No	Yes	Yes	
TeamNote	No	No	No	Yes	Yes	Yes	
Telegram	Yes	Yes	Yes	Yes	Yes	Yes	Yes
Tencent QQ	Yes	Yes	Yes	Yes	Yes	Yes	Yes
Threema	Yes	Yes	Yes	Yes	Yes	Yes	Yes
Trillian	Yes	Yes	Yes	Yes	Yes	Yes	Yes
Viber	Yes	Yes	Yes	No	Yes	Yes	Yes
WeChat	Yes	Yes	Needs third-party client	Yes	Yes	Yes	Yes
WhatsApp	Yes	Yes	Needs third-party client	Yes	Yes	Yes	Yes
Wire	Yes	Yes	Yes	Yes	Yes	Yes	Yes
Client	Windows	macOS	Linux	Web	Android	iOS	iPadOS

== Connectivity ==
Client	Registration requirement	Independent of mobile phone	End-to-end encryption	Peer-to-peer text chat	Open source servers	Federated servers
Briar	No		Yes	Yes	N/A(P2P)	N/A(P2P)
Discord	Email and Phone number	Yes	No	No	No	No
Element	No	Yes	Yes	No	Yes	Yes
Fractal	No			No	Yes	Yes
Gadu-Gadu	Email and Phone number			No	No	
Gajim	No	Yes	Yes	No	Yes	
Gitter	?	?	?	?	?	?
Google Chat	Email; Google account	Yes				
Google Messages (RCS)	Phone number	Similar to SMS requirements, RCS messaging requires a valid SIM card to be inserted in the device. RCS chat features may continue to work for up to 14 days, when a SIM card is removed from the device.	Yes, only for RCS chats		N/A	Yes
ICQ	Phone number	Phone required for initial registration. Desktop client can function independently afterwards.		No		
Jami	No	Yes	Yes	Yes	N/A(P2P)	N/A(P2P)
Jitsi	No	Yes		No	Yes	Yes
KakaoTalk		No		No	No	No
Kik Messenger	Email	No		No	No	No
Line	Phone number	No		No	No	No
Linphone	No	Yes	No	No	Yes	Yes
Mattermost				No	Yes	No
Messages (Apple)	Email; Apple ID account	Yes		No	N/A	N/A
Messenger	Email or Phone number; Facebook account	Yes		No	No	No
Movim	No			No	Yes	Yes
Mumble	no	Yes			Yes	Yes
Palringo	No			No	No	
Paltalk	Email			No	No	
Pidgin	No	Yes	With extension only	Yes	Yes	Yes
Psi				No		
RetroShare				Yes	N/A(P2P)	N/A(P2P)
Ricochet			Yes	Yes	N/A(P2P)	N/A(P2P)
Session	No	Yes	Yes	No	Yes	Yes
Signal	Phone number; iOS or Android device. VoIP number	Phone required for initial registration. iPadOS or Desktop client can function independently afterwards.	Yes	No	Yes	No
Skype	Email; Microsoft account	Yes		No	No	No
Slack	Email	Yes		No	No	No
Snapchat	Email or Phone number	No		No	No	No
Surespot	No			No	No	
TeamNote						
Telegram	Phone number; iOS or Android device	Phone required for initial registration & login. Desktop client can function independently afterwards.	For some features: secret chats, voice and video calls, and voice chats in groups	No	No	No
Tencent QQ		No	No	No	No	No
Threema	No	A valid phone number or email address is not required for registration & login. However, the mobile app serves as the primary device, due to the end-to-end encryption architecture.	Yes	No	No	No
Trillian	No	Yes		No	No	Yes
Viber	Phone number	No	Yes	No	No	No
WeChat	Phone number or QQ number	No	No	No	No	No
WhatsApp	Phone number	No	Yes	No	No	No
Wire	Email or Phone number	Yes	Yes	No	Yes	Yes
Client	Registration requirement	Independent of mobile phone	End-to-end encryption	Peer-to-peer text chat	Open source servers	Federated servers

== Privacy ==
Some messaging services that are not designed for privacy require a unique phone number for sign-up, as a form of identity verification and to prevent users from creating multiple accounts.

Some messaging services that do not solely focus on a mobile-first experience, or enforce SMS authentication, may allow email addresses to be used for sign-up instead.

Some messaging services offer greater flexibility and privacy, by allowing users to create more than one account to compartmentalize personal & work purposes, or not requiring personally identifiable information for sign-up.

To find out if the software has end-to-end encryption, see "media" table below.

Client	Share username	Hide number	Account expiration	Reset password	Password lockout	Search for contacts	Voice changer	Plugins
Briar						by public key or in-person pairing		
Discord						Username & Discord Tag; Phonebook contacts scanning if enabled		No
Element						Username; Matrix ID		Yes
Fractal						Username; Matrix ID		
Gadu-Gadu								No
Gajim								Yes
Gitter								
Google Chat						Email address		
Google Messages (RCS)						Phone number		
ICQ								Yes
Jami	Yes		No (not stored on servers)	No (not stored on servers)	No (not stored on servers)	by random identifier or email-like address	No	Yes
Jitsi						by shared 4-random-words URL		Yes
KakaoTalk								
Kik Messenger						Username; Phonebook contacts scanning if enabled		
Line						Username; Phone number; Phonebook contacts scanning if enabled (sending friend requests are required)		Yes
Linphone								
Mattermost								Yes
Messages (Apple)						Email address; Phone number		No
Messenger						Facebook profile; Username URL; Phone number; Phonebook contacts scanning if enabled		Yes
Movim								No
Mumble						username		
Palringo								No
Paltalk								No
Pidgin								Yes
Psi								Yes
RetroShare								
Ricochet								
Signal	Yes	Default. Number is only visible if it is saved to a friend's contact		No	30 seconds after 5 fails	Phone number (Contact list syncs automatically with phonebook contacts)		No
Skype						Username; Email address; Phone number		Yes
Slack						Name (requires joining a Slack workspace); Email address invitation (requires Slack Connect)		Yes
Snapchat						Username; Phonebook contacts scanning if enabled		Yes
Surespot							No	No
TeamNote								
Telegram			6 months		5 seconds after 3 fails	Username; Phone number (Contact list syncs automatically with phonebook contacts)		No
Tencent QQ								No
Threema								No
Trillian								Yes
Viber						Phone number (Contact list syncs automatically with phonebook contacts)		Yes
WeChat						Username; Phone number; Phonebook contacts scanning if enabled (sending friend requests are required)		
WhatsApp	No					Phone number (Contact list syncs automatically with phonebook contacts)		No
Wire								No
Client	Share username	Hide number	Account expiration	Reset password	Password lockout	Search for contacts	Voice changer	Plugins

- 1: Apple iOS doesn't allow screenshot protection.

=== Screenshot security ===
Client	Hide number in chats	Lock screen timeout	Lock screen when closed	Lock screen button	Screenshot detection	Screenshot/recording disabled (Android only)
Briar		Yes				Yes
Discord		No				
Element		No				
Fractal						
Gadu-Gadu						
Gajim	No	No	No	No	No	No
Gitter						
Google Chat						
Google Messages (RCS)						
ICQ						
Jami	No (not stored on servers)	No			No	Yes
Jitsi		No				
KakaoTalk						
Kik Messenger						
Line		Yes				
Linphone						
Mattermost		No				
Messages (Apple)		No				
Messenger		No				
Movim		?				
Mumble						
Palringo						
Paltalk						
Pidgin						
Psi						
RetroShare						
Ricochet						
Signal		Yes	No	Yes		Yes
Skype						
Slack						
Snapchat		Yes				
Surespot						
TeamNote						
Telegram	Yes	Yes	No		Yes (on Secret Chats)	Yes (on Secret Chats)
Tencent QQ						
Threema		Yes				
Trillian						
Viber		Yes				
WeChat						
WhatsApp	No	Fingerprint sensor				
Wire		No				
Client	Hide number in chats	Lock screen timeout	Lock screen when closed	Lock screen button	Screenshot detection	Screenshot/recording disabled (Android only)

== Message handling ==
Client	Threads			Sent messages				Read messages		Self-destructing messages	
Client	Threads	Collapse	Ignore	Editing	Deleting	Delete for contacts	Delete notification	Receipts	Hide receipts	Exists	Deletion trigger
Briar	Yes	No	No					Yes		No	
Discord	Yes	Yes	Yes	Yes	Yes			No		No	
Element	Yes	Yes	No	Partial	Yes			Yes		No	
Fractal											
Gadu-Gadu											
Gajim				Yes				Yes		No	
Gitter											
Google Chat	Yes	Yes	Yes	Originally for Google Workspace accounts only; rolled out to consumer accounts in July 2023	Originally for Google Workspace accounts only; rolled out to consumer accounts in July 2023			Yes		No	
Google Messages (RCS)	No	No	No	No	Yes			Yes		No	
ICQ	No	No	No		Yes						
Jami	No	No	No	No	Desktop only	No	Not applicable	Yes	Android only	Yes	
Jitsi	No	No	No							No	
KakaoTalk	No	No	No								
Kik Messenger	No	No	No								
Line	No	No	No	No	Partial			Yes		No	
Linphone	No	No	No								
Mattermost	Yes	Optional 7+	No	Yes	Yes			No		No	
Messages (Apple)	No	No	No							No	
Messenger	Yes	No	No	No	Yes			Yes		Yes	
Movim	Yes	No	No	Yes	Yes					No	
Mumble	No	No	No								
Palringo	No	No	No								
Paltalk	No	No	No								
Pidgin	No	No	No	Yes							
Psi	No	No	No	Yes							
RetroShare	Yes	Yes	No	No	No			Yes		No	
Ricochet	No	No	No								
Signal	No	No	No	Yes	Yes	Within 24 hours	Yes	Yes	Yes	Yes	Read
Skype	No	No	No								
Slack	Yes	Yes	Yes	Yes	Yes			Yes			
Snapchat	No	No	No	No	Yes			Yes		Yes	
Surespot	No	No	No							No	
TeamNote	No	No	No	Yes	Yes			No			
Telegram	No	No	No	Yes	Yes	Yes	No	Yes	No	Yes	Read
Tencent QQ	No	No	No								
Threema	No	No	No	No	Yes			Yes		No	
Trillian	No	No	No					Yes			
Viber	No	No	No	Yes	Yes			Yes		Yes	
WeChat	No	No	No								
WhatsApp	No	No	No	No	Partial			Yes	Yes	No	
Wire	No	No	No	Yes	Yes			Yes		Yes	
Client	Threads			Sent messages				Read messages		Self-destructing messages	
Client	Threads	Collapse	Ignore	Editing	Deleting	Delete for contacts	Delete notification	Receipts	Hide receipts	Exists	Deletion trigger

== Media ==
Client	File transfer	Voice messages	Voice chat	Video chat	E2EE		Encrypted local storage
Client	File transfer	Voice messages	Voice chat	Video chat	Individual	Groups	Encrypted local storage
Briar	Yes	No	No	No	Yes	Yes	Yes
Discord	Yes	Yes	Yes	Yes	No	No	
Element							
Fractal							
Gadu-Gadu	Yes	Yes	Yes		No	No	
Gajim	Yes	Yes	No	No	Yes	Yes	
Gitter							
Google Chat	Yes	Yes	Yes	Yes	Yes	No	
Google Messages (RCS)	Yes	Yes	Yes	Yes	Yes	Yes	
ICQ	Yes	No	Yes	Yes	No	No	
Jami	Yes	Yes	Yes	Yes	Yes	Yes	Yes
Jitsi	Yes	Yes	Yes	Yes	Yes		
KakaoTalk	Yes				Yes	Yes	
Kik Messenger	Yes				No	No	
Line	Yes	Yes	Yes	Yes	Partial	Yes	
Linphone							
Mattermost	Yes	Plug-in	Plug-in	Plug-in	No	No	
Messages (Apple)	Yes	Yes	Yes	Yes	Yes	Yes	
Messenger	Yes	Yes	Yes	Yes	Yes	No	
Movim	Yes	No	Yes	Yes	Yes	For private group	
Mumble	Yes		Yes	No	No	No	
Palringo	No	No	Yes	No	No	No	
Paltalk	Yes		Yes	Yes	No	No	
Pidgin	No	No	Partial	Yes	Yes		
Psi	Yes	Yes	Partial	Partial	Yes	Yes	
RetroShare	Yes				Yes	Yes	
Ricochet					Yes		
Signal	Yes	Yes	Yes	Yes	Yes	Yes	Partial
Skype	Yes	Yes	Yes	Yes	Yes	No	
Slack	Yes				No	No	
Snapchat	No	Yes	Yes	Yes	No	No	
Surespot	Yes	Yes	Yes	No	Yes	No groupchat	
TeamNote		Yes		No			
Telegram	Yes	Yes	Yes	Yes	Secret Chats	No	No
Tencent QQ	Yes	No	Yes	Yes	No	No	
Threema	Yes	Yes	Yes	Yes	Yes	Yes	Yes
Trillian	Yes	Partial	Yes	Yes	No	No	
Viber	Yes	Yes	Yes	Yes	Yes	Yes	
WeChat	Yes	Yes	Yes	Yes	No	No	
WhatsApp	Yes	Yes	Yes	Yes	Yes	Yes	No
Wire	Yes	Yes	Yes	Yes	Yes	Yes	No
Client	File transfer	Voice messages	Voice chat	Video chat	E2EE		Encrypted local storage
Client	File transfer	Voice messages	Voice chat	Video chat	Individual	Groups	Encrypted local storage

== Backup and restore messages ==
Official status to guarantee support for backing up and restoring messages.

Client	Windows	macOS	Linux	Web	Android	iOS
Beeper						
Briar						
Discord						
Element						
Fractal						
Gadu-Gadu						
Gajim						
Gitter						
Google Chat						
Google Messages (RCS)						
ICQ						
Jami						
Jitsi						
KakaoTalk						
Kik Messenger						
Line						
Linphone						
Mattermost						
Messages (Apple)						
Messenger						
Mumble						
Movim						
Palringo						
Paltalk						
Pidgin						
Psi						
RetroShare						
Ricochet						
Session						
Signal	No	No	No	No	Yes	Yes
Skype						
Slack						
Snapchat						
Surespot						
TeamNote						
Telegram						
Tencent QQ						
Threema						
Trillian						
Viber						
WeChat						
WhatsApp	No	No	No	No	Yes	Yes
Wire	Yes	Yes	Yes	Yes	Yes	Yes
Client	Windows	macOS	Linux	Web	Android	iOS

== Miscellaneous ==
Messaging services can operate around different models, based on security and accessibility considerations.

A mobile-focused, phone number-based model operates on the concept of primary and secondary devices. Examples of such messaging services include: WhatsApp, Viber, Line, WeChat, Signal, etc. The primary device is a mobile phone and is required to login and send/receive messages. Only one mobile phone is allowed to be the primary device, as attempting to login to the messaging app on another mobile phone would trigger the previous phone to be logged out. The secondary device is a computer running a desktop operating system, which serves as a companion for the primary device. Desktop messaging clients on secondary devices do not function independently, as they are reliant on the mobile phone maintaining an active network connection for login authentication and syncing messages.

A multi-device, device-agnostic model is designed for accessibility on multiple devices, regardless of desktop or mobile. Examples of such messaging services include: Skype, Facebook Messenger, Google Hangouts (subsequently Google Chat), Telegram, ICQ, Element, Slack, Discord, etc. Users have more options as usernames or email addresses can be used as user identifiers, besides phone numbers. Unlike the phone-based model, user accounts on a multi-device model are not tied to a single device, and logins are allowed on multiple devices. Messaging services with a multi-device model are able to eliminate feature disparity and provide identical functionality on both mobile and desktop clients. Desktop clients can function independently, without relying on the mobile phone to login and sync messages.

Client	Typing notifications	Multi-device support	Emoji reactions	Stickers	GIF search	Custom emoji	Themes / skins
Briar				No		Yes	No
Discord	Yes	Yes	Yes	Yes (custom stickers require paid)	Yes	Paid	Paid
Element		Yes	Yes	Yes	No	Yes	Yes
Fractal							
Gadu-Gadu						No	
Gajim	Yes					Yes	Yes
Gitter							
Google Chat		Yes (an optional setting allows messages to be accessible on Gmail as well)		Yes	Yes		No
Google Messages (RCS)		On secondary web browsers only (phone required to sync messages)	Only a limited set of reactions available	Yes	Yes		Partial
ICQ		Yes		Yes		Yes	Yes
Jami	Yes	Yes	Partial	No			
Jitsi						Yes	
KakaoTalk		On secondary desktop devices only (phone required to sync messages)				No	
Kik Messenger		No				Yes	Yes
Line		On secondary desktop devices only (phone required to sync messages)		Yes	Yes	No	Yes
Linphone							
Mattermost				No		Yes	Yes
Messages (Apple)		Yes (Apple devices)				No	No
Messenger		Yes (messages are also accessible on the main Facebook website)	Yes	Yes	Yes	No	Yes
Movim				Yes		No	No
Mumble							
Palringo						No	Yes
Paltalk						No	Yes
Pidgin				No	No	Yes	Yes
Psi						Yes	Yes
RetroShare				Yes		No	
Ricochet						No	
Signal	Yes	On secondary desktop devices only (phone required to sync messages; 5 linked devices)	Yes	Yes	Only on Android and iOS	No	Yes
Skype		Yes		Yes	Yes	No	No
Slack	Yes	Yes				Yes	Yes
Snapchat		No		Yes	Yes	No	No
Surespot						No	Yes
TeamNote						No	
Telegram	Yes	Yes	Full set of reactions only available on Telegram Premium	Yes	Yes	Requires subscription	Yes
Tencent QQ		On secondary desktop devices only (phone required to sync messages)				No	Yes
Threema		On secondary desktop devices only (phone required to sync messages). Phone must maintain an active network connection at all times to use the desktop client.		Yes		No	Yes
Trillian						Yes	Yes
Viber		On secondary desktop devices only (phone required to sync messages)	Only a limited set of reactions available	Yes	Yes	No	Yes
WeChat		On secondary desktop devices only (phone required to sync messages)				No	
WhatsApp	Yes	On secondary desktop devices only (phone required to sync messages; 4 linked devices); Phone must not be offline for ≥ 14 days; message history limited to 3 months. Unsupported on iPad, iPod Touch.	Yes	Yes	Yes	No	No
Wire	Yes	Yes	Yes	Yes	Yes	Yes	Yes
Client	Typing notifications	Multi-device support	Emoji reactions	Stickers	GIF search	Custom emoji	Themes / skins

== See also ==
- Comparison of instant messaging protocols
- Comparison of IRC clients
- Comparison of VoIP software
  - List of SIP software
- Comparison of LAN messengers
- List of video telecommunication services and product brands
- Comparison of user features of messaging platforms
