= List of free and open-source iOS applications =

Applications for iOS

This is an incomplete list of notable applications (apps) that run on iOS where source code is available under a free software/open-source software license. Note however that much of this software is dual-licensed for non-free distribution via the iOS app store; for example, the GPL version 3 is not compatible with the app store.

Application name	Description	License	Source	Notes
Adblock Plus	An open source content blocker for Safari	GPLv3	git	Also available for Android and as a browser extension.
AdGuard	An open source adblocker for iOS	GPLv3	git	Also available for Android, Windows, macOS, and as a browser extension.
AltStore	An alternative app store for non-jailbroken iOS devices.	AGPLv3	git	
Brave	Mobile web browser	MPL 2.0	git	Also available for Android, Windows, macOS and Linux.
Bitwarden	Password manager	GPLv3	git	Also available for Windows, Linux, macOS and Android.
Bluesky	Official Bluesky app	MIT	git	Also available for Android.
ChatSecure	Encrypted XMPP client	GPLv3	git	
Collabora Online	Office suite compatible with Microsoft Office, enterprise ready LibreOffice	MPLv2.0	git	Also available for Android, ChromeOS, iPadOS, Windows, macOS and Linux.
CoMaps	Offline maps and navigation using OpenStreetMap data	Apache 2.0	git	Fork of Organic Maps. Also available for Android, macOS, and Linux.
DuckDuckGo	DuckDuckGo search engine client	Apache 2.0	git	Also available for Firefox, Chrome, Safari and Android.
Element	Matrix collaboration client for iOS	Apache 2.0	git	Also available for Android, Web and Linux.
Firefox Focus	Mobile web browser	MPL 2.0	git	Also available for Android.
Firefox for iOS	Mobile web browser	MPL 2.0	git	
iNaturalist	The official iNaturalist app	MIT	git	Also available for Android.
Infomaniak Drive	File sync and share - The secure cloud	GPLv3	git	Also available for Windows, Linux, macOS and Android.
IVPN	Official IVPN iOS app	GPLv3	git	Also available for Android, Windows, macOS, and Linux.
Jami	Softphone and instant messenger	GPLv3	git	Also available for Windows, Linux, macOS and Android.
Joplin	Note taking and to-do application with synchronization capabilities	MIT	git	Also available for Android, Windows, macOS and Linux.
Kickstarter	App for the website kickstarter.com	Apache 2.0	git	Also available for Android.
Kiwix	An offline reader for Wikipedia	LGPLv3	git	Also available for Android, Windows, macOS, Linux and as a browser extension.
Kodi	An open source media player	GPLv2+	git	Also available for Android, Windows, macOS, and Linux.
Linphone	Video SIP/VoIP client	GPLv2	git	Also available for Android.
MAPS.ME	Offline maps and navigation using OpenStreetMap data	Apache 2.0	git	Also available for Android.
Mastodon	Official app for the Mastodon decentralized social network	GPLv3	git	Also available for Android.
Meshtastic	Official iOS Meshtastic client app for the Meshtastic decentralized network	GPLv3	git	Also available for Android.
Mullvad	The Mullvad VPN client app for iOS	GPLv3	git	Also available for Android, Windows, macOS, and Linux.
MuPDF	PDF reader	AGPL v3+	git	Also available for Android, Windows, and Unix-like systems.
NetNewsWire	RSS reader	MIT	git	Also available for macOS.
Nextcloud	File sync and share, with encryption possible	GPLv3	git	Also available for Android, Windows, macOS, and Linux.
Nextcloud Talk	Chat, voice and video calling	GPLv3	git	Also available for Android.
NymVPN	VPN service	GPLv3	git	Also available for Android, MacOS, Linux, and Windows.
OnlyOffice	Open-source office suite compatible with Microsoft Office	AGPL v.3	git	Also available for Android, Windows, macOS, and Linux.
Open Food Facts	Open-source and open-data food scanner	Apache 2.0	git	Also available for Android.
Onion Browser	An open-source, privacy-enhancing web browser for iOS, utilizing the Tor anonymity network	own	git	
Organic Maps	Offline maps and navigation using OpenStreetMap data	Apache 2.0	git	Also available for Android and on F-Droid and AppGallery.
OsmAnd	Offline maps and navigation using OpenStreetMap data	MIT	git	Also available for Android.
OwnCloud	File sync and share (the official ownCloud app)	GPLv3	git	Also available for Android, Windows, macOS and Linux.
Proton Drive	Remote file storage, sync/share	GPLv3	git	Integrates with Proton Docs and Proton Sheets. Also available for Android (and MacOS, Linux, and Windows).
Proton Mail	Email client	GPLv3	git	Also available for Android (and MacOS, Linux, and Windows).
Proton Pass	Password manager	GPLv3	git	Also available for Android (and MacOS, Linux, and Windows).
Proton VPN	VPN service	GPLv3	git	Also available for Android (and MacOS, Linux, and Windows).
Signal	Encrypted instant messaging, voice and video calling	GPLv3	git	Also available for Android, Windows, macOS, and Linux.
Session	Encrypted, decentralized, privacy-focused messaging & calling without any meta-data collected	GPLv3	git	Also available for Android, Windows, macOS, and Linux.
Simplenote	Encrypted notes	GPLv2	git	Also available for Android, Windows, macOS and Linux.
Surespot	Encrypted instant messaging	GPLv3	git	Also available for Android.
Telegram	Instant messaging	GPLv2	git	Also available for Android, Windows Phone, and Firefox OS.
Threema	Encrypted instant messaging, voice, video, and group calls	AGPLv3	git	Also available for Android, Windows, macOS, Linux and web.
Tuta	Email client	GPLv3	git	Also available for Android, Windows, macOS and Linux.
Vim	A port of the UNIX based text editor to iOS, with syntax highlighting	Free software	git	
VLC for iOS	A port of the free VLC media player	MPL 2.0; GPLv2+	git	
The White House	The official White House app	MIT	git	
wikiHow	wikiHow app	GPL	git	
Wikipedia	The official Wikipedia app	MIT	git	Also available for Android, webOS and Kindle.
Wire	Encrypted instant messaging, voice and video calling	GPLv3	git	Also available for Android, Windows, macOS and Linux.
WordPress	The official WordPress app	GPLv2	git	Also available for Android.

== See also ==
- App Store
- List of iOS games
- List of free and open-source Android applications
- List of free and open-source software packages
