= Fractal (disambiguation) =

A fractal is a mathematical set that has a fractal dimension that usually exceeds its topological dimension and may fall between the integers. There is also a fractal derivative, defined in fractal spacetime.

Fractal or Fractals may also refer to:

- Fractal (EP), 2009 album by Swedish metal band Skyfire
- Fractal (software), an instant messaging client and collaboration software
- Fractal (video game), 2011 puzzle game by Philadelphia-based studio Cipher Prime
- Fractal Analytics, multinational artificial intelligence company
- Fractal art, form of algorithmic art
- Fractal Audio Systems, an American guitar amplifier brand
- Fractal Design, Swedish hardware company
- Fractal161, Classic Tetris World Championship winner Justin Yu
- Fractals (journal), scientific journal published by World Scientific
- Fractals, 2015 album by English dubstep producer Silkie
- The Baudelaire Fractal, a 2020 novel by Lisa Robertson
- NASA X-70 Fractal, a proposed research aircraft
