= Matrix element =

Matrix element may refer to:

- The (scalar) entries of a matrix.
- Matrix element (physics), the value of a linear operator (especially a modified Hamiltonian) in quantum theory
- Matrix coefficient, a type of function in representation theory
- Element (software), free and open-source software instant messaging client implementing the Matrix protocol.
