= Social media use by the Islamic State =

The Islamic State is widely known for its posting of disturbing content, such as beheading videos, on the internet. This propaganda is disseminated through websites and many social media platforms such as Twitter, Facebook, Telegram, and YouTube. By utilizing social media, the organization has garnered a strong following and successfully recruited tens of thousands of followers from around the world. In response to its successful use of social media, many websites and social media platforms have banned accounts and removed content promoting the Islamic State from their platforms.

== Background ==
The Islamic State is a Jihadist militant group and a former unrecognised proto-state. The group sophisticatedly utilizes social media as a tool for spreading its message and for international recruitment.

== Target audience ==
IS targets a variety of different groups both in the Middle East and Western Countries. There are a wide variety of motives for why fighters may be prompted to join IS. Researchers from Quantum cite nine attributes characteristic of a fighter looking to join IS: status seeking, identity seeking, revenge, redemption, thrill, ideology, justice, and death.

The standard IS recruit, both from the Middle East and Western countries, is relatively young. The average age of IS fighters is around 26 years old, with 86% of recruits being male. Middle Eastern recruits come from economically disadvantaged backgrounds in Northern Iraq. Recent destruction in the Iraq War and Syrian Civil War has created hatred of Western Powers in the region.

By 2025, researchers identified a significant shift toward targeting minors and adolescents, a phenomenon dubbed the "Alt-Jihad." This younger demographic is targeted not through theological arguments, but through a "victimhood-revenge" narrative that blends extremist ideology with pop-culture aesthetics in gaming environments like Roblox and Minecraft. In 2024 alone, 42 minors were arrested in Europe for involvement in IS-related plotting or propaganda.

Western recruits are often second or third-generation immigrants. Computer scientist Zeeshan ul-hassan Usmani also found that the majority of the Western recruits do not feel "at home" in their home country. As a result, these fighters often have desires to go abroad and escape conditions in their home country.

In addition to recruitment, IS's social media presence is also meant to intimidate and spread terror around the world. IS's posting of beheadings and other execution videos primarily target the Western world.

== Content and messages ==
IS produces propaganda videos that range from video executions to full-length documentaries. The videos have a high production quality and incorporate montages, slow motion scenes, and are often accompanied by a short dialogue. IS has a dedicated team of over 100 media insurgents dedicated to recording these videos.

While the group previously relied on glossy magazines like Dabiq, post-territorial strategies have shifted focus to the weekly newsletter Al-Naba. Unlike previous publications designed for recruitment, Al-Naba serves as a "central pillar" of the group's media strategy, focusing on bureaucratic reporting and military statistics to project a narrative of endurance and maintain internal cohesion among dispersed fighters.

The IS executions typically consist of beheadings or mass shootings in retaliation to western intervention in IS territory. The particular videos that IS often post include executions of "enemies of the Caliphate," which often consist of westerners or Jordanian nationals. Most infamously, an executioner nicknamed Jihadi John was seen in many of these videos prior to his death in 2015. Jihadi John is notorious for executing many US, UK, and Japanese citizens such as Steven Sotloff, David Haines, and Alan Henning.

In many of the videos and materials produced by IS, there is the theme of inclusion and brotherhood. Additionally, the videos also focus on three main messages:

1. Convey narrative of global war and ultimate victory
2. Radicalize populations globally
3. Encourage international lone state actor and small cell attacks in support of IS

These messages can be seen throughout all content produced by the Islamic State such as war documentaries, execution videos, and Rumiyah (magazine).

== Social media usage ==
From 2013 to 2014, the organization primarily used mainstream platforms such as Twitter, Facebook, and YouTube. In 2014, these large social media platforms removed IS content. Since then, IS has chosen to utilize social media platforms that either protect their content or allow for content to quickly be reposted. These platforms of choice are Telegram, Justpaste.it, and Surespot, until the latter's shutdown in 2022. By 2025, the group had further diversified into decentralized platforms like Rocket.Chat and TamTam to evade moderation.

IS also implements marketing initiatives like “Jihadist Follow Friday,” which encourages users to follow new IS-related accounts each Friday. This specific hashtag mirrors commonly used hashtags such as #motivation monday or #throwbackthursday. To augment their online presence and popularity, the organization encourages their followers to use a plethora of Arabic hashtags, which translate to #theFridayofSupportingISIS, and #CalamityWillBefalltheUS. This allows them to gain followers each week while promoting their community and message on a weekly basis.

=== Twitter ===
During 2014, there were an estimated 46,000 to 90,000 Twitter accounts that advocated for IS or were run by supporters of the group. In 2015, Twitter reported that it banned 125,000 IS sympathetic accounts. In 2016, it published an update of 325,000 deleted accounts.

Though many accounts have been suspended, IS supporters often create new accounts. Twitter defines those who recreate accounts as “resurgents” and explains that these are often difficult accounts to remove completely, since they tend to pop back up in alternate forms. It is estimated that approximately 20% of all IS affiliated Twitter accounts can be traced back to fake accounts created by the same user. Many of these accounts are traced back to the “Baqiya family,” which is an online network of thousands of IS followers. Many of these accounts are active during important IS military victories. During the IS march on Mosul, there were about 42,000 tweets on Twitter supporting the invasion.

=== Telegram ===
During 2014, IS became very active on Telegram after many major social media platforms banned IS content and sympathetic accounts. Telegram is an encrypted messaging application. The platform by nature is created as an end-to-end user encryption platform. Further, it also has special features such as the self-destruct timer which erase all evidence and messages. The app has a user data protection policy because violating this policy could potentially damage the app’s brand of customer privacy. Government agencies have been unable to break Telegram's encryption technology.

On Telegram, IS often uses the hashtag #KhilafahNews to attract their users. Telegram is used by IS to plan social media campaigns on alternate platforms. The organization also uses Telegram as an anchor platform to connect with their user base when their other accounts are banned on Twitter and Facebook.

On 28 February 2016 a video was uploaded threatening to expose the najaasah and shoot the hesitates. Produced by Ibn-Altayb and distributed by Al-Hayat, the video shows footage of Bruxelles attacks and the victims.

In July 2017, Telegram came under scrutiny from the media and news media outlets. It has been documented that IS gunmen have used this app to maintain contact with IS leaders in Raqqa days before terror attacks in Turkey, Berlin, and St. Petersburg. Despite concerns from Western media, there has been little to no action taken against IS accounts on Telegram.

In April 2019 a video was uploaded in which they urged lone wolves to attempt to attack during the Holy Week in Sevilla and Málaga. In Sevilla, a jihadist who intended to perform a lone wolf attack was arrested.

=== TikTok ===
In October 2019, it was reported that IS recruitment content was discovered on TikTok. Approximately two dozen accounts were subsequently shut down in response.

By 2025, TikTok had evolved into a "low-threshold" gateway for extremist recruitment, characterized by researchers as part of a "Virtual Caliphate Complex." Nearly 93 unofficial IS support groups, known as "feeder groups," were found to be repackaging official IS content into short-form videos with pink hearts, catchy music, and internet memes to evade detection and appeal to the "TikTok generation." This content often promotes a "victimhood-revenge" narrative rather than complex theology, specifically designed to radicalize minors.

=== Justpaste.it ===
Justpaste.it, an anonymous photo and text sharing website, has also been utilized heavily. With the option to lock images, the website allows anonymous users to send and receive content without registration. For this reason, IS members have shared photos of countless murders, executions, and battlegrounds onto the app to be disseminated to other applications.

There have been calls to shut down the site to prevent its usage by IS or other extremist groups. However, founder Mariusz Żurawek has resisted doing so. He stated, "I do not want to interfere with any type of conflict and stay on one side. Justpaste.it has many users. I cannot focus on a single group. I don’t see any reason why they should shut down the service. Should they shut down Twitter, too?"

In 2014, Justpaste.it removed graphic content from the website—this prompted IS to launch their own content-sharing pages. These sites included Manbar.me in 2014, Nasher.me in January 2015, and Alors.ninja, in July 2015. IS social media offices relied most heavily on Manbar.me to distribute propaganda photos of battles and city raids. In 2016, IS introduced PasteMaker and Sharetext, which mirrored the encrypted messages of Justpaste.it. Despite creating their own platforms periodically, they were considerably more difficult to navigate; thus IS returned to using Justpaste.it.

=== The Dawn of Glad Tidings smartphone application ===
IS created The Dawn of Glad Tidings, an Arabic-language application. This app shared many of the tweets, pictures, and videos from IS sympathetic Twitter accounts. Additionally, it allowed users to see and monitor hashtags, tweets, images, videos, and comments that were posted on their accounts. The application was originally intended for IS followers to have a private online forum to communicate. This app was downloaded several hundred times on the Google Play app store before being taken down.

=== Offline impact ===
As the November 2015 attacks in Paris demonstrate, IS also resorts to old-fashioned methods of communication and propaganda. Lewis notes that the attacks in Paris represent a 'propaganda of the deed', a method developed by 19th century anarchists in Europe. The November 2015 IS attacks were perpetrated without prior warning, largely because the operatives met face-to-face and used other non-digital means of communication. Additionally, it is common for IS to claim responsibility of many terror attacks around the world such as the Paris Attacks, the Pulse night club shooting, and the Las Vegas attack.

== Usage of the dark web ==
IS’s activities on the surface web are subject to scrutiny and regulations by corporations, government agencies, and hackers. IS has been forced to look for a new online safe haven; thus, it posts a variety of content on the Dark Web as well as their own internally generated platforms. IS's usage of dark web has made anti-terrorism work more difficult.

Using the dark web, IS has made their own platform to increase their ability to spread their message. Without the intervention of corporate actors or government entities, IS has been able to freely spread their messages on their own platforms and websites. In 2017, Europol, the European Police, was able to uncover 52 unique online IS networks on the dark web. These 52 unique networks contained over 2,000 unique extremist items.

== Relevant impact of the IS social media usage ==
IS social media posts have mobilized ordinary citizens throughout the world and other radical jihadists groups to act upon their digitized demands. Their methods have worked to effectively recruit younger individuals to join their groups in a consolidated setting. Platforms such as Facebook, Twitter, and YouTube are more impressionable mediums, especially on a younger demographic. For this reason, ISIS strategically places their polished messages on these platforms to attract potential new members from an early age. A study about the repercussions of social media demonstrated that there were approximately 1,264 cases that could be categorized as “violent-inciting” examples; in these cases, IS social media experts have deliberately posted threatening propaganda to provoke offline aggression. Many “call for action” verbs that have a positive connotation have also been utilized to establish feelings of justification towards any pertinent violence.

A 2022 study found that IS online "propaganda conveying the material, spiritual, and social benefits of joining ISIS increased online support for the group, while content displaying brutal violence decreased endorsement of ISIS across a wide range of videos."

== Critiques of movement and backlash ==
Both national governments and corporations have taken a stand against IS in both the physical and virtual spheres.

The U.S. Department of State announced an international coalition in 2014, in which they list five lines of effort to expose IS. They include:

- Providing military support to partners
- Impeding the flow of foreign fighters
- Stopping financing and funding
- Addressing humanitarian crises in the region
- Exposing true nature

Companies are also taking action to hinder IS social media recruitment attempts. Google’s ThinkTank, Jigsaw, launched a collaboration with YouTube in July 2017 to redirect any potential recruits using the Redirect Method. After facing growing pressure from the government leaders, Facebook announced that the company is using Artificial Intelligence to detect terrorism related contents, their effort would extend to other Facebook owned platforms such as WhatsApp.

“The Redirect Method uses Adwords targeting tools and curated YouTube videos uploaded by people all around the world to confront online radicalization. It focuses on the slice of ISIS’ audience that is most susceptible to its messaging, and redirects them towards curated YouTube videos debunking ISIS recruiting themes. This open methodology was developed from interviews with ISIS defectors, respects users’ privacy and can be deployed to tackle other types of violent recruiting discourses online.”

By using this tactic, Jigsaw catches slogans that manifest any positive IS sentiments, like Baqiyah wa Tatamadad ('Remaining and Expanding'), and Al Dawla Al Islameyah, which includes al-Dawla, a sign of respect.

Lastly, Anonymous declared war against IS in November 2015, attempting to thwart the social media recruitment efforts by targeting IS's communication networks.
