= Vyvozhuk =

- Вывожук
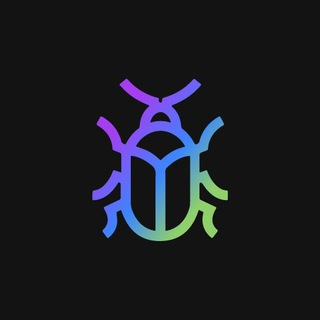
- Formation: 9 October 2022; 3 years ago
- Legal status: Active
- Location: Various countries
- Website: zhuk.world

Vyvozhuk is an international online organization, aimed at aiding the Russian citizens who are facing persecution for their opposition to the Russian invasion of Ukraine. The name of the organization is a pun on the Russian words "evacuation" and "bugs".

Vyvozhuk gives instructions and provides aid to Russians who are being persecuted by FSB, helping then to safely leave Russia. Members of the organization are anonymous, and use the messenger Element for communication.

On 16 July 2025, the journalist Irina Shikhman took an interview with the members of Vyvozhuk.

== Links ==
- Vyvozhuk's Telegram channel
