= Coala (software) =

Language independent analysis toolkit

coala

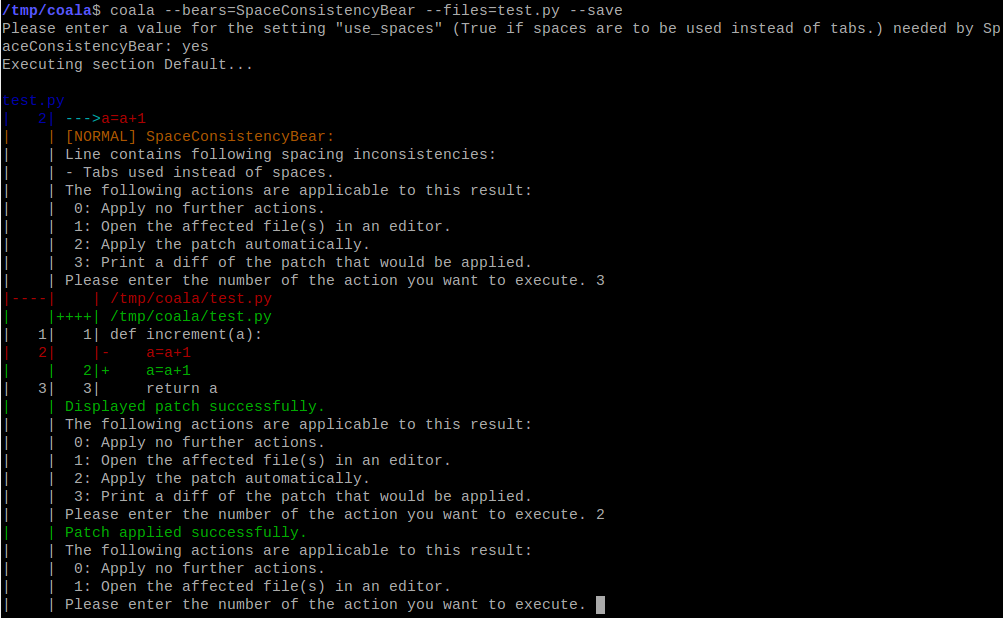
- The SpaceConsistencyBear detecting tabs in files where spaces were expected using coala's terminal interface.
- Original author(s): https://github.com/coala
- Developer(s): The coala community
- Stable release: 0.11.0 / 22 May 2017; 7 years ago
- Repository: github.com/coala/coala
- Written in: Python
- Type: Code analysis
- License: AGPLv3
- Website: coala.io

coala is a free and open-source language independent analysis toolkit, written in Python. The primary goal of coala is to make it easier for developers to create rules which a project's code should conform to. coala emphasizes on reusability and pluggability of analysis routines, and the principle of don't repeat yourself (DRY).

On 6 May, it was featured on SDTimes.com as GitHub Project of the Week. coala was also featured in the hackerpublicradio. On 9 May 2016, an article was published on Medium by Gitter regarding its community.

== Features ==
=== Bears ===
Bears in coala are the equivalent plugins or extensions which provide some analysis routines. Bears can be language dependent as well as language independent. The language dependent bears supported by the coala community provide analysis routines for more than 30 languages.

=== Integrations ===
Integrations with a few editors/IDEs have been supported. This includes:

- Atom
- Sublime Text 3
- Vim
- gedit
- Emacs
- Eclipse

There are also interfaces with different visualizations provided like the web interface, command-line, D-Bus, and JSON.

== Version History ==
Version	Date	Code name
0.2	26 Jul 2015	wombat
0.3	31 Dec 2015	platypus
0.4	30 Jan 2016	eucalyptus
0.5	18 Mar 2016	joey
0.6	29 Apr 2016	honeybadger
0.7	22 Jun 2016	
0.8	22 Aug 2016	
0.9	22 Nov 2016	
0.10	5 Feb 2017	
0.11	22 May 2017	
