= Gajim =

Free instant messaging client for the XMPP protocol

- framless
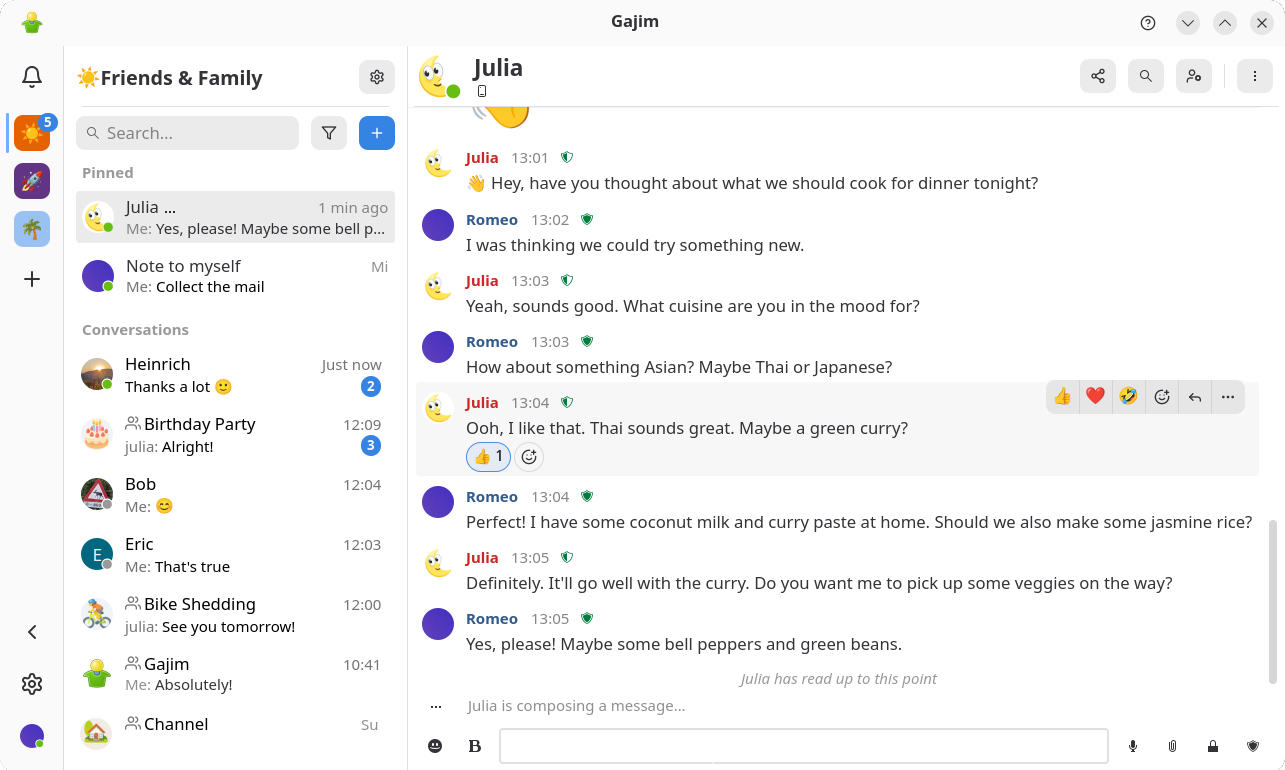
- Gajim main window (version 2.3.0)
- Developer: Gajim Developers
- Release: May 21, 2004
- Stable release: 2.6.0 / 27 August 2026
- Written in: Python
- Operating system: BSD, Linux, macOS, Microsoft Windows
- Standard: XMPP
- Available in: Multi language
- Type: Instant messaging client
- License: GPL-3.0-only
- Website: gajim.org
- Repository: gitlab.com/gajim/gajim

Gajim /ɡɛˈʒiːm/ is an instant messaging client for the XMPP protocol which uses the GTK toolkit. The name Gajim is a recursive acronym for "Gajim's a jabber instant messenger". Gajim runs on Linux, BSD, macOS, and Microsoft Windows. Released under the GPL-3.0-only license, Gajim is free software. A 2009 round-up of similar software on Tom's Hardware found version 0.12.1 "the lightest and fastest jabber IM client".

== Features ==
Gajim aims to be an easy-to-use and fully featured XMPP client. Gajim uses GTK (PyGObject) as GUI library, which makes it cross-platform compatible. Some of its features:

- Group chat support
- Emojis, Avatars, File transfer
- Systray icon, Spell checking
- TLS and end-to-end encryption support with OMEMO, OpenPGP, OTR (with a plugin)
- Transport Registration support
- Service Discovery including Nodes
- Wikipedia, dictionary and search engine lookup
- Multiple accounts support
- D-Bus Capabilities
- XML Console
- Jingle voice and video support (removed since version 2.0.0 due to lack of maintainer)
- HTTP file upload
- Read markers
- Hats

Gajim is available in Basque, Bulgarian, Chinese, Croatian, Czech, English, Esperanto, French, German, Italian, Norwegian (Bokmål), Polish, Russian, Spanish, Slovak, Swedish, Ukrainian and others.

=== Third-party plugins ===
Gajim supports various third-party plugins (official list).

== See also ==
- Comparison of instant messaging clients
