= TeamNote =

- Developer: TeamNote Limited
- Release: 2012
- Operating system: Android, iOS, web browser
- Available in: English, Traditional Chinese, Simplified Chinese
- Website: https://teamnoteapp.com

TeamNote is a mobile-first business communication and collaboration software developed by the Hong Kong–based technology company TeamNote Limited. TeamNote is a product that is provided as a white label solution to corporations and deployed in a private cloud or an on-premises server. It allows users to send text messages and voice messages, share images, documents, user locations, and other content. It is not available for download on the iOS App Store or in Google Play. TeamNote adds new users by sending out links or manual deployment.

== Features ==
TeamNote offers standardized communication features, customizable workflow modules and system integration. The primary features of TeamNote are instant messaging including text and voice, individual and group chat mode, as well as news announcements organized by top management. It also offers GPS location tracking, polling or voting, task assignments, photo reporting, sales reporting in chat rooms and share training manual. In addition, TeamNote also has customized features such as form filling, HR tasks, job dispatch, and duty roster.

== Platforms ==
TeamNote provides Android and iOS mobile apps for end user, and web portal for web clients including end user and superuser.

== Business model ==
TeamNote offers subscription business model and claimed to charge US$5 per user per month. The fee would be adjusted accordingly for additional features. A custom rate could be applied if a deeper integration is required.

== History ==
TeamNote is a product started off its research and development in 2012, under its then-parent company Apptask Limited, a project-led mobile applications development company. TeamNote was originally developed for a Hong Kong local real estate conglomerate as a customized corporate communication app, which inspired its founder Roy Law and the team to develop TeamNote as a product.

TeamNote Limited as an independent company was founded in July 2013, after spinning off from its now-sister company Apptask Limited and TeamNote is officially launched to the Asia market in the first quarter of 2014. In January 2015, TeamNote Limited as a startup company was shortlisted to be a part of Y Combinator's three-month-long accelerator programme and received $120,000 seed money and later raised approximately US$1M angel round. TeamNote announced its global launch during an interview with TechCrunch in March 2015.

The original TeamNote app focused on secure messaging. This included password-protected conversations, the ability to send a message out to a group and get private replies, and even a feature to make sensitive messages disappear after a specific expiration date. As it expanded, the application has gained features for managing shifts for workers on the field, who can send back messages and photographs related to their work in to their company’s home base to complete tasks. There are also mobile training modules, letting teams quickly get new workers out on the field up to speed without making them sit down and watch an entire training session.

== Award ==
In 2014, TeamNote won the Red Herring (magazine) Asia Top 100 Technology Award in Hong Kong and Global Top 100 Technology Award in Los Angeles. In 2015, TeamNote won the Best Mobile Apps Grand Award and Best Mobile Apps (Business and Enterprise Solution) Gold Award in Hong Kong ICT Awards. TeamNote also won merit of Asia Pacific ICT Alliance Awards (APICTA).

== See also ==
- Comparison of cross-platform instant messaging clients
- List of collaborative software
- Secure communication

== Sources ==
- Emily Goh, 25 startups in Asia that caught our eye (8/3/2015),
- 來自香港的Slack對手 – TeamNote (8/03/2015),
- Josh Horwitz, Y Combinator-backed TeamNote is a Hong Kong–born answer to Slack and HipChat (4/03/2015),
- Kyle Russell, YC-Backed TeamNote Provides Enterprise Communications For Companies With People Out In The Field (3/03/2015),
- 當辦公也移動：YC 孵化的“團信”欲打造企業版WhatsApp (5/02/2015),
- 羅國明, 矽谷啟示錄(一)：闖矽谷需要盲公竹 (30/01/2015),
- 港產通訊App 闖矽谷：「創業很型！」(27/01/2015),
- Y Combinator casts its eye towards Asia and what that means for you (18/03/2015),
- Here Are The Companies That Presented At Y Combinator Demo Day 1 (24/03/2015),
- 深入矽谷精煉技術TeamNote向國際進發 (24/03/2015),
- 2015 香港資訊及通訊科技獎得獎者巡禮 (二) (15/05/2015),
- Startups to Watch: Hong Kong, The Wall Street Journal (19/05/2015),
- 我從矽谷加速器回來，學到的是…(30/05/2015),
- 矽谷啟示錄(二)：知識分享並非「教路」(02/06/2015),
- 2015香港資訊及通訊科技獎得獎巡禮(三) (04/06/2015),
- 香港初創科企：走出創業迷霧 (05/06/2015),
