= Threema =

Instant messaging smartphone service

- App icon
- Developer: Threema AG
- Release: December 2012

Stable release(s)
- Android: 6.5.3-1216 / 23 September 2026
- iOS: 7.0.4 / 15 March 2026
- Desktop: 1.2.50 / 9 March 2026
- Written in: Objective-C (iOS), Java (Android), C, .NET (Windows Phone)
- Operating system: iOS, Android, Windows Phone
- Available in: English, German, French, Spanish, Italian, Russian, Brazilian Portuguese, Polish, Rumantsch Grischun
- Type: Encrypted instant messaging & voice calling
- License: Android client: AGPL-3.0-only iOS client: AGPL-3.0-only; Web client: AGPL-3.0-or-later; Protocol: MIT; Server: Proprietary
- Website: threema.ch

Threema is a paid cross-platform encrypted instant messaging app developed by Threema AG in Switzerland and launched in 2012. Users can make voice and video calls, send photos, files, and voice notes, share locations, and join groups. The service offers end-to-end encryption. Unlike many other popular secure messaging apps, Threema does not require phone numbers or email addresses for registration, only a one-time purchase that can be paid via an app store or anonymously with Bitcoin or cash.

Threema is available on Android and iOS, and has clients for HarmonyOS, Linux, macOS and Windows. It can be accessed via web browser but requires a mobile app to function.

== Features ==
The service claims to be based on the privacy by design principles by not requiring a phone number or other personally identifiable information. This helps anonymize the users to a degree.

Threema uses a randomly generated user ID, created after the initial app launch, instead of requiring a linked email address or phone number to send messages. It is possible to find other users by phone number or email address, if the user allows the app to synchronize their address book.

Linking a phone number or email address to a Threema ID is optional. Hence, the service can be used anonymously.

Users can verify the identity of their Threema contacts by scanning their QR code when they meet in person. The QR code contains the public key of the user, which is cryptographically tied to the ID and will not change during the lifetime of the identity.

Using this strong authentication feature, users can make sure they have the correct public key from their chat partners, which provides additional security against a man-in-the-middle attack.

Threema classifies contacts according to three verification trust levels. The verification level of each contact is displayed in the Threema application as dots next to the corresponding contact.

In addition to text messaging, users can make voice and video calls, share locations, voice messages, and send media or other files. A web app, Threema Web, can be used on desktop devices, but only as long as the phone with the Threema installation of the user is online. There is a beta for iOS users, which allows for the phone to be offline while using a desktop app.

In addition to one-to-one chats, Threema offers group chats with up to 256 people. Files are limited to 50MB per file. It is also possible to create polls in personal or group chats.

To emulate the 'Saved Messages' feature available in other messengers, one can create a group with only oneself as a member. For licensing and privacy reasons, Threema does not include a GIF library natively, but it is compatible with GIF keyboards and plays animations seamlessly in the chat.

== Software ==
Threema is developed by the Swiss company Threema AG. The servers are in Switzerland and the development is based in Pfäffikon SZ. As of May 2021, Threema had 10 million users and the business version, Threema Work, was used by 2 million users across 5,000 companies and organizations.

At the end of July, 2021 Threema introduced the ability for companies to host the messenger on their own server, primarily intended for companies with significantly high privacy concerns.

=== Clients ===
With Threema Web, a client for web browsers, Threema can be used from other devices like desktop computers, though only as long as the original device is online.

Threema optionally supports Android Wear smartwatch and Android Auto. Threema launched support for end-to-end encrypted video calls on August 10, 2020. The calls are person-to-person with group calls unavailable.

The application does not allow the self-deletion of messages after a period defined by the interlocutors. The application does prevent screenshots in conversations when configured to do so.

=== Architecture ===
The entire communication via Threema is end-to-end encrypted. During the initial setup, the application generates a key pair and sends the public key to the server while keeping the private key on the user's device. The application then encrypts all messages and files that are sent to other Threema users with their respective public keys. Once a message is delivered successfully, it is immediately deleted from the servers.

The encryption process used by Threema is based on the open-source library NaCl. Threema uses asymmetric ECC-based encryption, with 256-bit strength. Threema offers a "Validation Logging" feature that makes it possible to confirm that messages are end-to-end encrypted using the NaCl Networking and Cryptography library.

In August 2015, Threema was subjected to an external security audit. Researchers from cnlab confirmed that Threema allows secure end-to-end encryption, and claimed that they were unable to identify any weaknesses in the implementation.

Cnlab researchers also confirmed that Threema provides anonymity to its users and handles contacts and other user data as advertised.

== History ==
Threema was founded in December 2012 by Manuel Kasper. The company was initially called Kasper Systems GmbH. Martin Blatter and Silvan Engeler joined Kasper to develop an Android application that was released in early 2013.

In Summer 2013, the Snowden leaks helped create an interest in Threema, boosting the user numbers to the hundreds of thousands. When Facebook took over WhatsApp in February 2014, Threema got 200,000 new users, doubling its userbase in 24 hours. Around 80% percent of those new users came from Germany. By March 2014 Threema had 1.2 million users.

In Spring 2014, operations were transferred to the newly created Threema GmbH. Martin Blatter took over the position of CEO.

In December 2014, Apple listed Threema as the most-sold app of 2014 at the German App Store.

In 2020, Threema expanded with video calls, plans to open-source its client-side apps and introduce reproducible builds of them, as well as introduce Threema Education, a variation of Threema intended for education institutions.

In September 2020, Threema was acquired by AFINUM, a German private equity firm based in Munich.

During the second week of 2021, Threema saw a quadrupling of daily downloads spurred on by controversial privacy changes in the WhatsApp messaging service. A spokesperson for the company also confirmed that Threema had risen to the top of the charts for paid applications in Germany, Switzerland, and Austria. This trend continued into the third week of the year, with the head of Marketing & Sales confirming that downloads had increased to ten times the regular amount, leading to "hundreds of thousands of new users each day".

In October 2022, researchers from ETH Zurich reported multiple vulnerabilities affecting Threema's security against network, server and client-based attacks. A new release fixing these issues was released in November 2022 and the vulnerabilities were announced publicly in January 2023.

In September 2024, CEO Martin Blatter and the remaining founders and original developers left the company and Robin Simon, a former executive from TX Group became CEO.

On 13 January 2026, the German private equity firm Comitis Capital announced that they reached an agreement with Threema Holding AG to acquire the company.

== Related products ==
=== Threema Work ===
On May 25, 2016, Threema Work, a corporate version of Threema, was released. Threema Work offers extended administration and deployment capabilities. Threema Work is based on a yearly subscription model.

=== Threema Gateway ===
On March 20, 2015, Threema released a gateway for companies. Similar to an SMS gateway, businesses can use it to send messages to their users who have Threema installed. The code for the Threema Gateway SDK is open for developers and available on GitHub.

=== Threema Broadcast ===
On August 9, 2018, Threema released Threema Broadcast, a tool for top-down communication. Similar to emails in electronic newsletters, Threema messages can be sent to any number of feed subscribers, and the Threema Broadcast allows to create chatbots.

=== Threema Education ===
On September 10, 2020, Threema released Threema Education, a version of its messenger designed for education institutions. The app integrates Threema Broadcast and requires a one-time payment for each device used. It's intended for use by teachers, students, and parents.

=== Threema OnPrem ===
On July 27, 2021, Threema released Threema OnPrem, a version of the messenger which could be hosted on a company's own servers for maximum security purposes.

== Privacy ==
Since Threema's servers are in Switzerland, they are subject to the Swiss federal law on data protection. The data center is ISO/IEC 27001-certified.

Linking a phone number and/or email address to a Threema ID is optional; when doing so, only checksum values (SHA-256 HMAC with a static key) of the email address and/or phone number are sent to the server.

Due to the small number of possible digit combinations of a telephone number, the phone number associated with a checksum could be determined by brute force. The transmitted data is TLS-secured. The address book data is kept only in the volatile memory of the server and is deleted immediately after synchronizing contacts.

If a user chooses to link a phone number or email address with their Threema ID, they can remove the phone number or email address at any time. Should a user ever lose their device (and their private key), they can revoke their Threema ID if a revocation password for that ID has been set.

Groups are solely managed on users’ devices and group messages are sent to each recipient as an individual message, encrypted with the respective public key. Thus, group compositions are not directly exposed to the server.

Data (including media files) stored on the users’ devices is encrypted with AES 256. On Android, it can be additionally protected by a passphrase.

Since 2016, Threema AG publishes a transparency report where public authority inquiries are disclosed.

On March 9, 2017, Threema was listed in the "Register of organizers of information dissemination in the Internet" operated by the Federal Service for Supervision of Communications, Information Technology and Mass Media of the Russian Federation.

In a response, a Threema spokesperson publicly stated:

"We operate under Swiss law and are neither allowed nor willing to provide any information about our users to foreign authorities."

On April 29, 2021, Threema won a significant case at the Federal Supreme Court of Switzerland against the Swiss Federal Department of Police and Justice, who wished to classify the company as a telecommunications provider. Had they lost the case, Threema would have had a legal requirement to identify users and send information about their users to law enforcement.

Starting January 2022, Swiss Armed Forces suggested that the troops should use Threema instead of WhatsApp, Telegram and Signal, citing Threema being Swiss-based without servers in the United States and thus not subject to the CLOUD Act, also promising that soldiers would be reimbursed for the cost.

== Reception ==
In February 2014, German consumer organisation Stiftung Warentest evaluated several data-protection aspects of Threema, WhatsApp, Telegram, BlackBerry Messenger and Line.

It considered the security of the data transmission between clients, the services' terms of use, the transparency of the service providers, the availability of the source code, and the apps' overall availability.

Threema was the only app rated as 'non-critical' (unkritisch) in relation to data and privacy protection, but lost marks due to its closed-source nature, though this has changed for its frontend clients since the end of 2020.

Along with Cryptocat and Surespot, Threema was ranked first in a study evaluating the security and usability of instant messaging encryption software, conducted by the German PSW Group in June 2014.

As of November 2015, Threema had a score of 6 out of 7 points on the – now withdrawn and outdated – Electronic Frontier Foundation's "Secure Messaging Scorecard". It received points for having communications encrypted in transit, having communications encrypted with keys the provider doesn't have access to (i.e. having end-to-end encryption), making it possible for users to independently verify their correspondent's identities, having past communications secure if the keys are stolen (i.e. implementing forward secrecy), having its security design well-documented and having completed an independent security audit.

It lost a point because its source code was not open to independent review (i.e. it was not open-source, though in late 2020 its client apps were open-sourced, leaving only its server daemons proprietary).

Since May 2023, Threema and several other encrypted messaging apps are banned in India for their alleged use by terrorists.

== See also ==
- Comparison of instant messaging clients
- BBM Enterprise
