= Fluxer =

Instant messaging and VoIP software

- Logo used since 2026

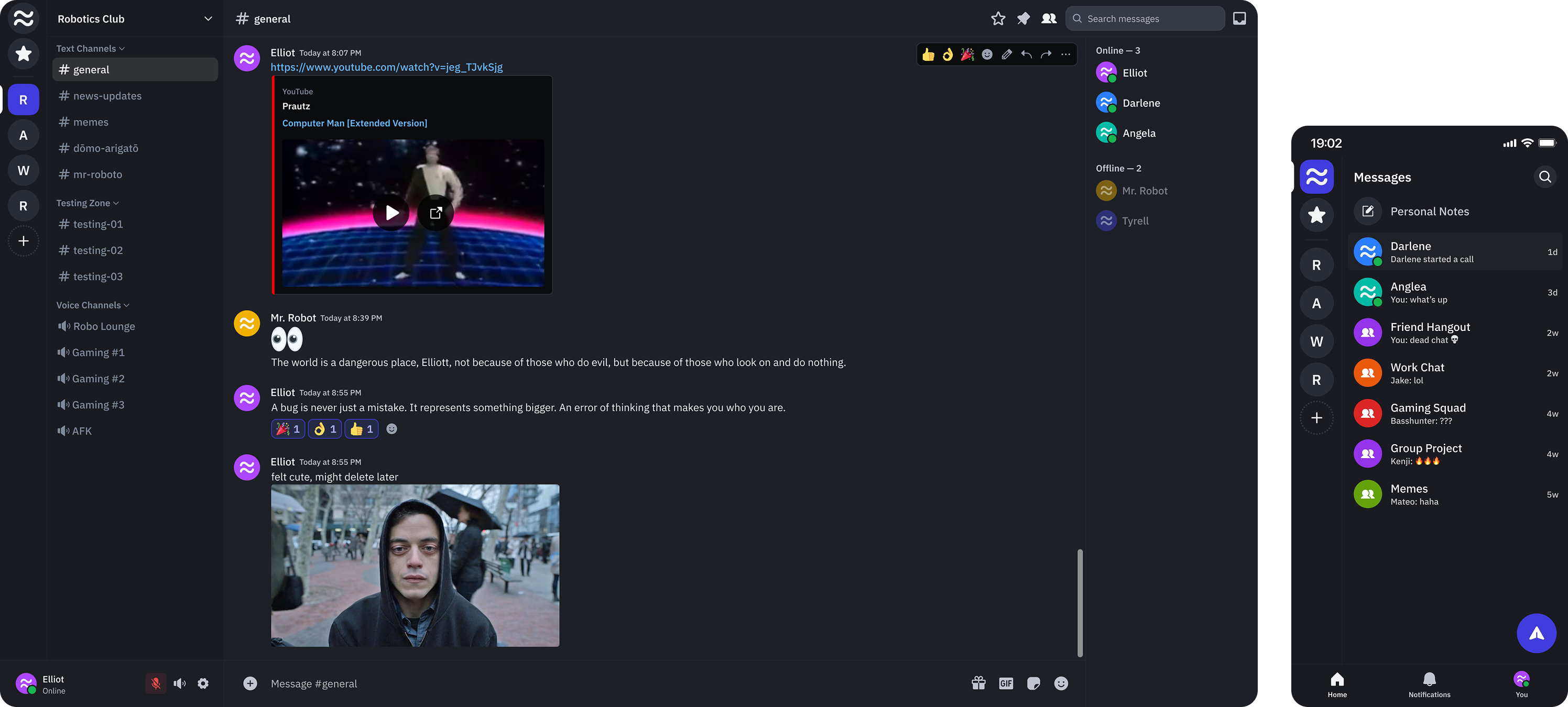
- Screenshot Fluxer on PC and mobile
- Original author: Hampus Kraft
- Developer: Fluxer Platform AB
- Release: 1 January 2026; 10 months ago
- Operating system: Windows, macOS, Linux, Android, iOS, web browsers
- Type: VoIP communications, Instant messaging
- License: AGPLv3
- Website: fluxer.com
- Repository: github.com/fluxerapp/fluxer

Fluxer is a free and open source instant messaging app and VoIP social media platform. It was created independently by Swedish student Hampus Kraft and released to the public in early January 2026. It is seen widely as an alternative to Discord, gaining popularity following its age verification policy changes.

Although the service is freemium, it does not require a subscription for most features, and the platform promises never to sell user data and never to use it to train generative artificial intelligence.

Fluxer is offering self-hosting, and federation is on its roadmap.

== History ==
The app was released in early January 2026 in hopes of competing with Discord. By late February of the same year, there was a sharp rise in new accounts, following Discord's announcement of a new age verification policy.

In March 2026, Fluxer had reached 125,000 users on its primary server. When Discord's IPO plans leaked, a viral Bluesky post led to massive user influx and server overload, changing the scale of the project drastically.

As of 19 October 2026, Fluxer surpassed half a million registered users.

== Funding ==
=== Plutonium ===
The Plutonium subscription serves as a paid premium plan and an equivalent to Discord's Nitro. It offers a wider range of tools such as higher file upload limits. However, the limits only apply to the official Fluxer instance. Third-party hosts are not affected and can set their own limits and tiers.

=== Visionary ===
When Fluxer first released, a one time $299 Plutonium payment called Visionaries was offered. This only had 1,000 places and from when it opened (25 October 2025) it sold out all of the places by 17 February 2026.

=== Operator Pass ===
Community operators may optionally buy the Operator Pass, granting additional support, however the pass is not required to operate a self-hosted Fluxer server.

The Operator Pass grants access to a PDF-document with a name of choice, a spot on the Operators' Wall, a unique badge and access to the #operators channel in the Fluxer Labs community. With the exception of the PDF-document, all other perks may change at Fluxer's discretion.

People who host their own Fluxer community may receive a unique mark within Fluxer's host discovery (called "instances"). Fluxer may decide not to list a host at its own discretion.
