= Session (software) =

Instant messaging software

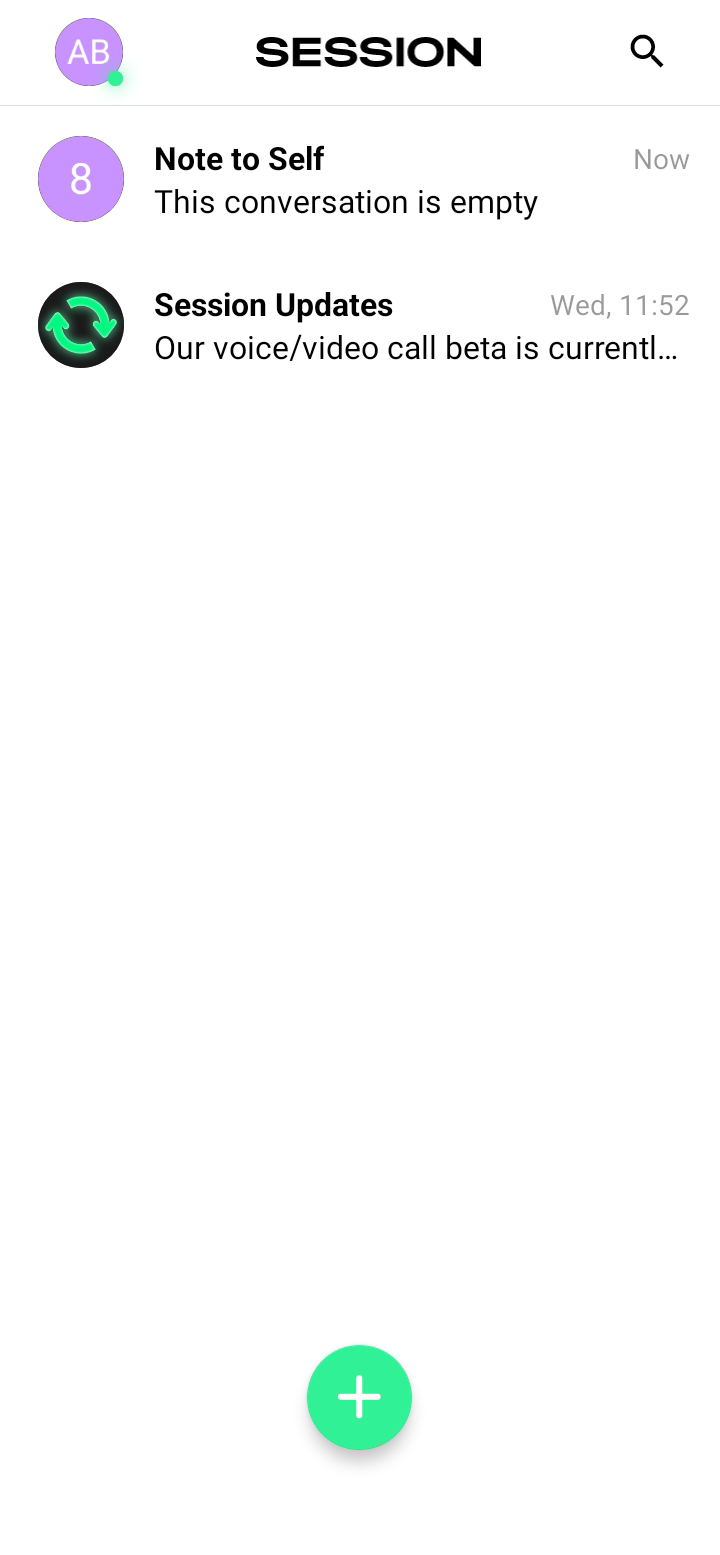
- Screenshot of Session version 1.17.4 on Android (December 2023)
- Developer: The Session Technology Foundation
- Release: February 2020; 6 years ago

Stable release(s)
- Android: 1.33.4 / April 9, 2026; 3 months ago
- iOS: 2.15.2 / April 9, 2026; 3 months ago
- Operating system: Android 6 or above; iOS 12 or above; Windows; macOS; Linux
- Type: Instant messaging
- License: BSD-3-Clause; MIT; GPL-3.0
- Website: getsession.org
- Repository: github.com/session-foundation/

Session is an Australian, currently Switzerland-based, cross-platform end-to-end encrypted instant messaging application emphasizing user confidentiality and anonymity. Developed and maintained by the non-profit The Session Technology Foundation, it employs a blockchain-based decentralized network for transmission. Users can send one-to-one and group messages, including various media types such as files, voice notes, images, and videos.

Session provides applications for various platforms, such as macOS, Windows, and Linux, along with mobile clients available on both iOS and Android.

On April 9, 2026, Session Technology Foundation announced that it will close operations after July 8th if it does not receive at least $1M in funding. On June 15, 2026, the STF announced they had enough resources to continue operation.

== Features ==
Session does not require a telephone number or email address for account creation. Instead, it utilizes a randomly generated 66-digit alphanumeric number for user identification. Communication between users, including messages, voice clips, photos, and files, is end-to-end encrypted using the Session protocol. Session uses the Loki blockchain network for transmissions. In 2021, an independent review by the third-party Quarkslab verified these claims. In 2025, Session announced that it had migrated to its own network, the Session Network — a decentralized, open-source blockchain network designed to transmit encrypted data, specifically for the Session messenger.

In December 2025, it was announced that Session's v2 protocol will implement Perfect Forward Secrecy (PFS), and Post-Quantum Cryptography (PQC).

Session's privacy policy, as of January 2026, indicates that it has no-logging policy, for instance the IP addresses, for users.

== Development ==
Development of Session began in 2018 under the Australia-based Oxen Privacy Tech Foundation. The project started as a fork of another messenger, Signal, aiming to build upon its foundation. However, concerns about the centralized structure of Signal Protocol and potential metadata collection led the team to deviate and create their own protocol, called "Session Protocol". This approach prioritized increased anonymity and decentralization. During development, the team encountered various challenges, leading to the necessity of abandoning or modifying many features.

In 2024, facing increasingly restrictive privacy and surveillance legislation in Australia, the Session Technology Foundation was established in Switzerland to take over the development and publication of the application.

== Limitations ==
Session lacks support for two-factor authentication, and its underlying protocols are still in a developmental phase. Following the migration from the Signal Protocol to its internally developed protocol, forward secrecy and deniable authentication were not implemented.

== See also ==
- Comparison of cross-platform instant messaging clients
- Internet privacy
- Secure communication
