= Gadu-Gadu =

Instant messaging software

- Developer: Fintecom Sp. z o.o.
- Initial release: August 15, 2000; 25 years ago
- Stable release: 12.4.109.12193
- Operating system: Windows, macOS, Linux, iOS, Android, Symbian, Windows Phone, BlackBerry OS
- Size: 5
- Available in: Polish and English
- Type: Instant messaging client
- License: adware
- Website: www.gg.pl

Gadu-Gadu (Polish for "chit-chat"; commonly known as GG or gg) is a Polish instant messaging client using a proprietary protocol. At its peak, Gadu-Gadu was the most popular IM service in Poland, with over 15 million registered accounts and up to 300 million messages sent per day. In 2010, the service reported over 10 million monthly active users.

Gadu-Gadu is financed by the display of advertisements. The developer is based in Koszalin, Poland and the company is wholly owned by another Polish company, Fintecom.

== Features ==
Gadu-Gadu uses its own proprietary protocol. As with ICQ, users are identified by unique serial numbers. Protocol's features include status messages, file sharing, and VoIP. Users may format and embed images in messages. Starting from client version 6.0, an experimental feature utilizing a secure SSL connection was introduced, although it remained inactive until the beta release of version 10.0.

The official client provides over 150 emoticons, allows grouping contacts, sending SMS, and integrates with other services run by the same company, such as the internet radio Open.fm and the social networking site MojaGeneracja.pl (defunct since 5 November 2012).

On February 9, 2009, a significant new major version of the application, named Nowe Gadu-Gadu (which translates to "New Gadu-Gadu" in Polish), was released. The graphical user interface underwent a complete overhaul, being rebuilt from scratch using the Qt framework. This update brought along a range of notable enhancements, including the introduction of voice calling capabilities, a spell checker, an anti-spam filter, the ability to display YouTube videos directly within the chat window as embeds, customizable skins, the addition of tabs, and several other additions aimed at improving the user experience and security.

Gadu-Gadu allows its users to add personal information to a publicly searchable directory. Language options include English and Polish. There is also a browser version available.

== Blip.pl ==
Blip.pl (or just Blip) was a Polish social networking internet service, founded in May 2007 and currently owned by Gadu-Gadu. It had microblogging capability. Soon after being established, it was purchased by Gadu-Gadu S.A in June 2007.

About 329,000 people visited the site in June 2009. In October 2009 the number of posts on the network exceeded ten million. By 4 December 2010 the service had 80,000 users. Notable Polish celebrities and politicians, such as Lech Wałęsa and Grzegorz Napieralski, used the site. The service was used as a communication channel of various governmental services, for example ZUS.

Blip was closed on 2 September 2013, following a two-month advance notice. During this period, users could choose to migrate their accounts to Wykop, which hosts a similar microblogging service.

== Recent developments ==
In 2025, Gadu-Gadu (GG) is undergoing a major transformation under the ownership of Fintecom S.A., which has developed new features and services to modernize the platform. The company is rolling out GGapp, a new cross-platform business communicator with audio-video calls, an AI assistant, GGchat for websites, and GGwallet for mobile payments and money transfers. As of mid-2025, GG has about 400,000 monthly active users, with over 13,000 supporting the platform through GG Premium subscriptions. Fintecom S.A. aims to turn GG into a European “super app,” integrating secure messaging, social features, and digital financial services.

== See also ==
- Comparison of instant messaging clients
- Comparison of instant messaging protocols
