= Gitter =

Open source messaging software

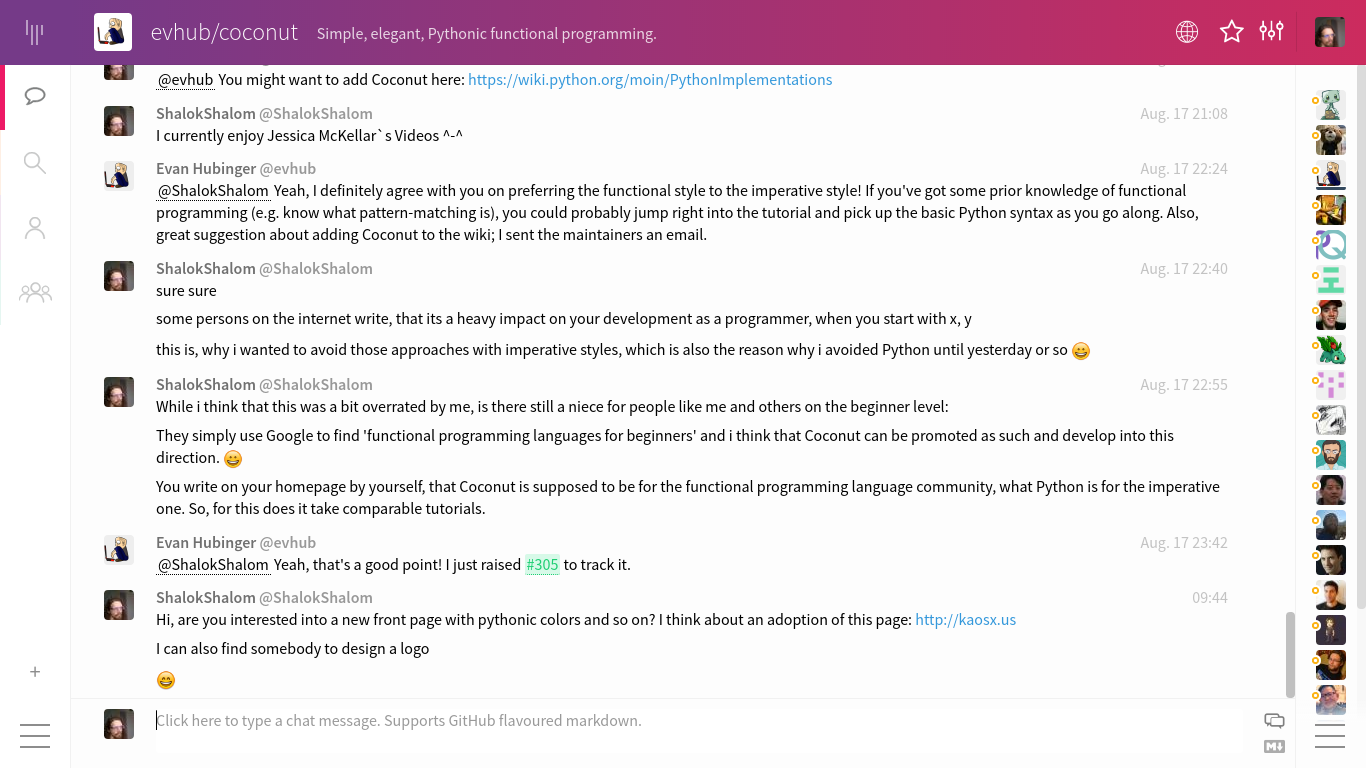
- Original author: Troupe Technology Ltd (subsidiary of GitLab)
- Developer: New Vector Ltd (trading as Element)
- Stable release: 21.56.9 / 13 February 2023; 3 years ago
- Written in: JavaScript
- Platform: Web, Windows, macOS, iOS, Android, Linux
- Type: Instant messaging
- License: MIT License
- Website: gitter.im
- Repository: gitlab.com/gitterHQ/webapp

Gitter is an open-source instant messaging and chat room system for developers and users of GitLab and GitHub repositories. Gitter is provided as software as a service, with a free option providing all basic features and the ability to create a single private chat room, and paid subscription options for individuals and organisations, which allows them to create arbitrary numbers of private chat rooms.

Individual chat rooms can be created for individual Git repositories on GitHub. Chatroom privacy follows the privacy settings of the associated GitHub repository: thus, a chatroom for a private (i.e. members-only) GitHub repository is also private to those with access to the repository. A graphical badge linking to the chat room can then be placed in the git repository's README file, bringing it to the attention of all users and developers of the project. Users can chat in the chat rooms, or access private chat rooms for repositories they have access to, by logging into Gitter via GitHub.

Gitter is similar to Slack. Like Slack, it automatically logs all messages in the cloud.

In late 2020, New Vector Limited acquired Gitter from GitLab, and announced Gitter's features would eventually be moved to New Vector's flagship product, Element, thereby replacing Gitter entirely. On February 13, 2023, Gitter migrated their service to a custom-branded Matrix instance that uses Element for its web interface.

== Features prior to Migration to Matrix ==
Gitter supports:

- Notifications, which are batched up on mobile devices to avoid annoyance
- Inline media files
- Viewing and subscribing to ("starring") multiple chat rooms in one web browser tab
- Linking to individual files in the linked git repository
- Linking to GitHub issues (by typing # and then the issue number) in the linked Git repository, with hovercards showing the details of the issue
- GitHub-flavored Markdown in chat messages
- Online status for users
- User hovercards, based on their GitHub profiles and statistics (number of GitHub followers, etc.)
- Browsable and searchable message archives, grouped by month
- Connection from IRC clients
- Gitter on iOS support authentication using GitHub or Twitter

=== Integrations with non-GitHub sites and applications ===
Gitter integrates with Trello, Jenkins, Travis CI, Drone (software), Heroku, and Bitbucket, among others.

=== Apps ===
Official Gitter apps for Windows, Mac, Linux, iOS and Android are available.

=== Account registration ===
Like other chat technologies, Gitter allows clients to instant message each other. It allows people to authenticate using a GitHub account and join a chatroom from a web browser, thus not requiring one to install any software, or create additional online accounts.

== History ==
Gitter was created by some developers who were initially trying to create a generic web-based chat product, but then wrote extra code to hook their chat application up to GitHub to meet their own needs, and realised that they could turn the combined product into a viable specialist product in its own right.

Gitter came out of beta in 2014. During the beta period, Gitter delivered 1.8 million chat messages.

On March 15, 2017, GitLab announced the acquisition of Gitter. Included in the announcement was the stated intent that Gitter would continue as a standalone project. It was published as open source under an MIT License as of June 2017. (Note: The source code has since been published in a set of repositories on GitLab's own instance of GitLab.)

On September 30, 2020, New Vector Limited acquired Gitter from GitLab, and announced upcoming support for the Matrix protocol in Gitter, which went live by the end of the year. Gitter's features would eventually be moved to New Vector's flagship product, Element, thereby replacing Gitter entirely.

On February 13, 2023, Gitter migrated their service to a custom-branded Matrix instance that uses Element for its web interface.

== Implementation prior to Migration to Matrix ==
The Gitter web application is implemented entirely in JavaScript, with the back end being implemented on Node.js. The source code to the web application was formerly proprietary (it was open-sourced in June 2017), although Gitter had made numerous auxiliary projects available as open-source software, such as an IRC bridge for IRC users who prefer using IRC client applications (and their extra features) to converse in the Gitter chat rooms.
