= The World's Online Festival =

Instant messaging and gaming software

WOLF
- Other names: Palringo
- Developer: Palringo Limited
- Initial release: 2006

Stable release(s)
- Android: 10.14 / 29 November 2021
- iOS: 10.13.1 / 19 October 2021
- Operating system: Android 6.0 or later, iOS 14.5 or later
- Available in: English, Arabic
- Type: Entertainment
- Website: wolf.live

The World's Online Festival (WOLF, formerly known as Palringo) is a British messaging and gaming platform, which developed the WOLF Qanawat app for iOS, Android, and website for Arabic-speaking users in the Middle East and North Africa region.

The platform allows users to create groups where they can send each other images, text, and audio messages, which then features a stage that provides five live microphone slots for users to chat. It also includes in-app purchases that can be used to send in-app gifts to other users and get access to additional features and games.

WOLF's headquarters are in London, UK, with branch offices in Newcastle upon Tyne, Riyadh, and Amman.

== History ==
Palringo was launched by Martin Rosinski in 2006, offering Palringo Local, a service which allowed users to view the location of their peers using their manual position, GPS, triangulation, or estimation based on the internet network the user was connected to. Palringo Local used Google Maps API to show peer locations, and also featured a "nearby" section in friends and group lists to show users in proximity.

In 2010, Palringo launched a version of the app for businesses, offering private group communication networks.

In August 2012, Palringo shifted their business model towards the consumer market, selling virtual products such as premium accounts, decorative profile stickers (called Charms), game bots, and functional utilities. The company acquired the Swedish games developer Free Lunch Design (FLD) in May 2014, and the Finnish game developer Tribe Studios in May 2015. In 2016, Gary Knight was brought on as CEO.

In late 2019, Palringo introduced the Stages feature, which allowed up to five users to broadcast live audio within their chat group.

In February 2020, Palringo was re-branded as the World's Online Festival, known as WOLF. In August 2023, WOLF released WOLF Virtual Reality (VR) on the Meta Quest platform, and in October 2023, they launched Yasmine, an AI virtual assistant.

WOLF reported that, As of 2025, over 4 million users had used the platform, with the community producing over 22,000 live shows per month. The company also reported an average revenue per paying user (ARPPU) of over $150 per month.

In August 2025, WOLF announced a revenue increase of $14 million, a 9% increase from their previous 2024 report.

== Philanthropy ==
WOLF has been involved in charity fundraising campaigns:

- In 2013, Palringo users raised over US$230,000 for Charity Right and Islamic Relief.
- During Ramadan in 2015, Palringo raised more than $300,000 to be split between Action Against Hunger and Islamic Relief Worldwide.
- In 2020, WOLF began charity fundraising for Save the Children.
