= Fractal (software) =

Messaging software for GNOME

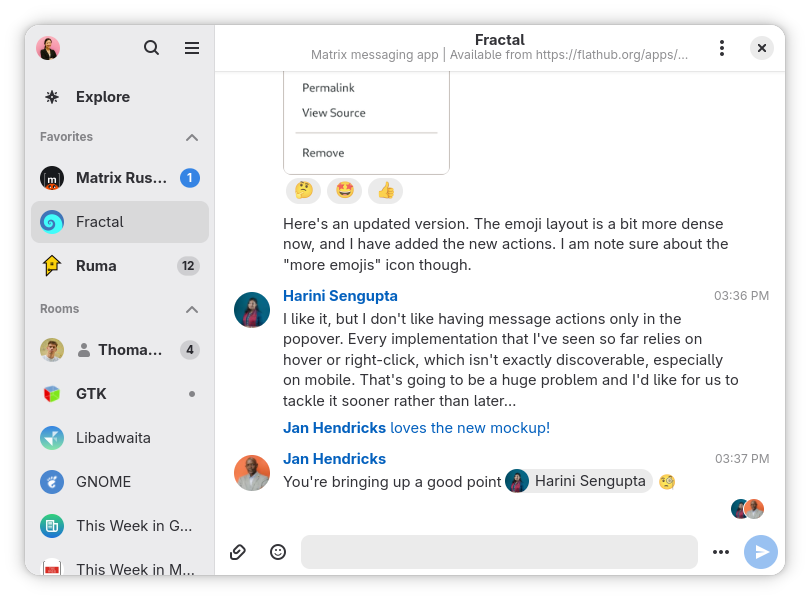
- Version 13
- Developer: The GNOME Project
- Release: 16 March 2018; 8 years ago
- Written in: Rust
- Platform: Unix-like
- Standard: Matrix
- Available in: 47 languages
- Type: IM, chat
- License: GPLv3
- Website: gitlab.gnome.org/World/fractal
- Repository: gitlab.gnome.org/World/fractal

Fractal is an instant messaging client and collaboration software for the GNOME desktop based on the Matrix protocol.

It is free software under the GNU General Public License version 3. Fractal can be installed on various Linux distributions via Flathub, which is the recommended installation method, although some distributions provide packages through their official repositories.

== Features ==
Fractal integrates well into the GNOME desktop with a clean and easy-to-use user interface design that is optimized for collaboration in big groups. It implements end-to-end encryption but lacks support for audio/video calls. The user interface targets both smartphones and desktop systems and adapts to different screen sizes and formats.

== Architecture ==
Fractal is written in Rust and has a graphical user interface that, like software for GNOME, is based on the GTK widget toolkit. For the adaptive user interface, it uses a software library called Libadwaita. Logon credentials can be stored in any local password manager that provides the Secret Service API.

== History ==
The first code was committed to Fest (formerly known as ruma-gtk) on December 29, 2016, from which the Fractal codebase was forked by Daniel García Moreno in August 2017. For the first release (v0.1.0) on November 10, 2017, it was called Guillotine.

With the release of version 0.1.22 on March 27, 2018, it entered beta status. With GNOME version 3.30 of September 5, 2018, it reached release status.

Over that summer, two students worked on Fractal, which was sponsored as part of the Google Summer of Code program, including the development of localization and spell-checking support. Computer manufacturer Purism was working to integrate it into the crowd-funded Linux smartphone Librem 5, and sponsored the development of some features such as support for Matrix' end-to-end encryption (E2EE) that was standardized in 2018. E2EE was implemented as a separate software module whose basic functionality was available by autumn 2018.

In 2021, a rewrite of Fractal was sponsored by NLnet. The goal was to base it on the Matrix Rust SDK which would then enable the software to fully support Matrix' end-to-end-encryption. The rewrite took two years and resulted in Fractal version 5.
