= Fractals (journal) =

- Discipline: Fractals
- Language: English
- Edited by: T. Taylor, S. S. Manna, M. M. Novak, B. Yu

Publication details
- History: 1993-present
- Publisher: World Scientific
- Frequency: Quarterly
- Impact factor: 3.154 (2 years) (2018)

Standard abbreviations
- ISO 4: Fractals

Indexing
- CODEN: FRACEG
- ISSN: 0218-348X (print); 1793-6543 (web)
- LCCN: 93648954
- OCLC no.: 28056668

Links
- Journal homepage; Online access

Fractals is a peer-reviewed scientific journal devoted to explaining complex phenomena using fractal geometry and scaling. It is published by World Scientific and has explored diverse topics from turbulence and colloidal aggregation to stock markets.

== Abstracting and indexing ==
The journal is indexed and abstracted in:

- Science Citation Index
- Current Contents/Physical, Chemical & Earth Sciences
- Mathematical Reviews
- Inspec
- Calcium and Calcified Tissues Abstracts
- Pollution Abstracts
- Aquatic Sciences and Fisheries Abstracts
- Selected Water Resources Abstracts
- Microbiology Abstracts
- Zentralblatt MATH
- Compendex

According to the Journal Citation Reports, the journal has a 2018 impact factor of 1.629.
