= Rocket.Chat =

Open-source messaging software

- Developer: Rocket.Chat Technologies Corp.
- Release: 2015
- Stable release: 8.4.0 / May 1, 2026; 4 months ago
- Engine: Meteor
- Website: rocket.chat
- Repository: github.com/RocketChat/Rocket.Chat

Rocket.Chat is an open-source team communication platform that provides messaging, file sharing, video conferencing, and collaboration tools. It is developed in TypeScript and built on Node.js and MongoDB. The software is available as both self-hosted and cloud-based deployments.

== History ==
Rocket.Chat was created in 2015 by Gabriel Engel and collaborators in Porto Alegre, Brazil. The project began as part of work on a customer relationship management (CRM) system when the developers needed a live chat component. According to Gabriel Engel, the team, originally working at the Brazilian business software company Konecty, had explored integrating Slack but found it too limited for their needs and decided to build their own chat platform using JavaScript. A prototype was published on GitHub, after which the project attracted community interest and further development.

The company was subsequently incorporated in Delaware while maintaining engineering operations in Brazil. Rocket.Chat has since maintained and expanded the project, securing external investment to support its growth. According to company statements, Rocket.Chat is in use internationally and has been adopted by a range of organizations, including enterprises and government agencies.

In 2024, Rocket.Chat's end-to-end encryption (E2EE) was independently analyzed by two research groups. One study was conducted by a research team based at The University of Osaka and was presented at the Annual Computer Security Applications Conference (ACSAC), an academic conference. Separately, an independent security analysis was conducted by a master's student at ETH Zurich as part of a master's thesis. Both studies reported multiple vulnerabilities affecting the confidentiality and integrity guarantees of Rocket.Chat's E2EE, and subsequent releases addressed several of the reported issues.

== Features ==
Rocket.Chat is a communication tools that cover messaging, voice, and video interaction, as well as security and customer engagement features. The platform supports real-time chat through channels, direct messages, discussions, and threads, along with file sharing and audio messaging. For video and voice communications, it integrates with Jitsi Meet and Pexip and also supports SIP-based VoIP calls. Security and compliance measures include two-factor authentication, LDAP and SSO integration, and optional end-to-end encryption. The platform reports compliance with major standards such as GDPR, HIPAA, SOC 2, and ISO 27001.

In 2022, Rocket.Chat adopted the Matrix protocol for federation, making it possible to interoperate with other communication systems. This was described as "a major coup for the Matrix movement" given the number of Rocket.Chat's users.

The platform supports an omnichannel feature that allows organizations to manage conversations from multiple sources, including email, SMS, WhatsApp and Instagram, which makes it useful for customer support and engagement. Rocket.Chat provides browser-based interface, desktop applications for Windows, macOS, and Linux, and mobile apps for iOS and Android.

== Architecture ==
Rocket.Chat is developed using TypeScript, Node.js, and MongoDB, and it can be deployed in several ways, including through Docker, Kubernetes, or conventional server setups. Organizations can choose different deployment models depending on their needs: self-hosted environments managed internally, cloud-hosted instances operated by Rocket.Chat, isolated air-gapped installations for high-security contexts, or hybrid configurations that combine local and cloud infrastructure.

The platform also supports integration capabilities through a marketplace on the Apps-Engine framework and allows developers to create and share extensions written in TypeScript. REST APIs and SDKs are also available for connecting Rocket.Chat with existing enterprise systems or custom applications.

== Business model ==
Rocket.Chat is a freemium product. The free plan offers self-managed hosting; the paid tiers provide additional features on a per-user subscription basis. There is also a plan for larger organizations that offers advanced capabilities and scalability options. The company generates revenue through these paid subscriptions, as well as from professional services and customer support contracts.

== Reception ==
- Sweden’s Digital Collaboration Platform for the Public Sector report evaluated several messaging tools by criteria such as federation, integration, usability, and data privacy, and selected Rocket.Chat among the "Permanent Chat Solutions", also noting it was seen as one of the most user-friendly viable platforms.
- In mid-2022, Rocket.Chat formed a partnership with Pexip to deliver a communication solution offering high-security deployments, including on-premises and geo-fenced options, aimed at organizations with strict data sovereignty requirements.
- Rocket.Chat was included in The Forrester Wave: Secure Communications Solutions (Q3 2024), a report that benchmarks vendors in secure communications.

== See also ==
- Mattermost
- List of collaborative software

== Bibliography ==
- Johnson, Richard (June 6, 2025), Rocket.Chat Administration and Deployment Guide, HiTeX Press, p. 250
- Thesis, Master; Schmid, Noah (March 18, 2024), Breaking Cryptography in the Wild: Rocket.Chat (PDF), Swiss Federal Institute of Technology Zurich, p. 81
- Kimura, Hayato; Ito, Ryoma; Minematsu, Kazuhiko; Isobe, Takanori (December 8–12, 2025). "Gravity of the Situation: Security Analysis on Rocket.Chat E2EE". Proceedings of the 2025 Annual Computer Security Applications Conference (ACSAC). Honolulu, Hawaii, USA: IEEE. pp. 15–30.
