= Jami (software) =

Distributed multimedia communications platform

GNU Jami
- Developers: Savoir-faire Linux Inc. and community contributors
- Release: December 23, 2004; 21 years ago

Stable release(s)
- App Store: 4.00 / October 22, 2025; 10 months ago
- Chocolatey: 2025.10.1 / October 1, 2025; 10 months ago
- F-Droid: 20251114-01 / November 14, 2025; 9 months ago
- Flathub: 20251106.0 / November 6, 2025; 9 months ago
- GNU/Linux: 20251116 / November 16, 2025; 9 months ago
- Google Play: 20251117-01 / November 17, 2025; 9 months ago
- Homebrew: 2.37 / November 22, 2025; 9 months ago
- macOS: 2.37 / November 22, 2025; 9 months ago
- Snap Store: 20251106 / November 6, 2025; 9 months ago
- Windows: 20251001 / October 1, 2025; 10 months ago
- Written in: Java, Kotlin, Python, Shell, Makefile, PowerShell, roff
- Operating system: Android, Android TV, iOS, iPadOS, Linux, Microsoft Windows, macOS
- Platform: 64-bit x86-64 and ARM
- Available in: Arabic, Albanian, Bulgarian, Catalan, Chinese, Croatian, Czech, Danish, Dutch, English, Estonian, Finnish, French, Galician, German, Greek, Hindi, Hungarian, Indonesian, Italian, Japanese, Korean, Malay, Malayalam, Nepali, Norwegian, Persian, Polish, Portuguese, Romanian, Russian, Serbian, Slovak, Slovenian, Spanish, Swedish, Tamil, Thai, Turkish, Vietnamese
- Type: Voice over IP, instant messaging, videoconferencing, telephony, softphone, SIP
- License: GPL-3.0-or-later
- Website: jami.net
- Repository: git.jami.net/savoirfairelinux

Jami is a telecommunications platform for peer-to-peer and distributed videotelephony, videoconferencing, and voice calls. Jami is free and open-source software released under the GNU GPL-3.0-or-later.

== History ==
In December 2004, Savoir-faire Linux launched the SFLPhone project.

In November 2009, CIO magazine listed SFLphone among the top five open-source VoIP softphones to watch.

In May 2015, SFLphone was renamed to Ring.

In December 2018, Ring was renamed to Jami to avoid confusion with commercial products also using the English term Ring.

In 2025, TechRadar listed it as one alternative to Skype following its discontinuation.

== Features ==
Available features depend on both the Jami client and the platform used.

- Operates on a peer-to-peer basis without a central server (apart from the centralised name server). Jami can be used on local networks without an Internet connection.
- End-to-end encryption used for chat, video, and voice.
- SIP-compatible with OpenDHT support.
- Instant messaging.
- Call recording.
- Audio and video calls with multi-party audio and video conferencing.

Usernames are stored on a private Ethereum blockchain administered centrally by Jami.
