= Mattermost =

Open-source messaging software

- Developer: Mattermost Inc
- Release: October 2, 2015; 11 years ago
- Written in: Go, JavaScript, TypeScript
- Available in: 16 languages
- License: MIT License for "Mattermost Team Edition" Linux binary server compiled by Mattermost, Inc., AGPLv3 for uncompiled Mattermost server source code, (Apache License 2.0 for Admin Tools and Configuration Files), and Apache License 2.0 for the rest
- Website: mattermost.com
- Repository: github.com/mattermost/mattermost

Mattermost is an open-source, self-hostable online chat service with file sharing, search, and third-party application integrations. It is designed as an internal chat for organisations and companies, and mostly markets itself as an open-source alternative to Slack and Microsoft Teams.

== History ==
The code was originally proprietary, as Mattermost was used as an internal chat tool inside SpinPunch, a game developer studio, but was later open-sourced. The 1.0 was released on October 2, 2015.

The project is maintained and developed by Mattermost Inc. The company generates funds by selling support services and additional features that are not in the open-source edition.

It was also integrated into GitLab as "GitLab Mattermost".

== Features ==
In the media, Mattermost is mostly regarded as an alternative to the more popular Slack. Aside from the in-browser version, there are desktop clients for Windows, MacOS and Linux and mobile apps for iOS and Android.

As of version 6.0 Mattermost includes kanban board and playbook features integrated in main interface.

== See also ==
- Rocket.Chat
- List of collaborative software
