= Surespot =

2013–2022 instant messaging app

- Developer: Surespot LLC
Final release
- Android: 81 / April 27, 2019; 7 years ago
- iOS: 21 / November 29, 2018; 7 years ago
- License: GPL-3.0-or-later
- Website: www.surespot.me
- As of: 12 August 2022

Surespot was a free open-source instant messaging application for Android and iOS with a focus on privacy and security. It was shut down on July 31, 2022.

== Features ==
The application supported the sending of text, pictures, audio messages (in the past only after an in-app purchase), and Emoji icons. It also supported the deletion of messages from the receiving device. It allowed user blocking. There was no support for group messages and sending files other than photos. Surespot provided offline backup via iTunes (PC or Mac) on the iOS version, or to local device storage on the Android version.

For secure communication, Surespot used end-to-end encryption by default. 256-bit AES-GCM encryption was used, with keys created with 512-bit ECDH.

App users could use multiple identities, for instance for private or business use.

Surespot was donationware.

== Reception ==
As of November 4, 2014, Surespot had a score of 5 out of 7 points on the Electronic Frontier Foundation secure messaging scorecard. It had received points for having communications encrypted in transit, having communications encrypted with keys the provider doesn't have access to (end-to-end encryption), making it possible for users to independently verify their correspondent's identities, having its code open to independent review (open-source), and for having its security design well-documented. It was missing points because past communications were not secured if the encryption keys were stolen (no forward secrecy) and because there had not been a recent independent security audit.

== Controversy ==
In May 2015, Channel 4 News published an investigation in which they alleged that "at least 115 ISIS-linked people" appeared to have used Surespot between November 2014 and May 2015. In June 2015, a Surespot user wrote a blog post about how the Surespot developers had stopped responding to his repeated questions regarding "governmental demands for information", leading to the user alleging that the Surespot developers were "under a gag order".

Surespot was specifically mentioned in a plea agreement in which a 17-year-old US citizen was charged with providing material support to ISIS.

== See also ==
- Comparison of instant messaging clients
