= Off-the-Record Messaging protocol =

Cryptographic protocol

Off-the-Record Messaging (OTR) is a cryptographic protocol that provides encryption for instant messaging conversations. OTR uses a combination of AES symmetric-key algorithm with 128 bits key length, the Diffie–Hellman key exchange with 1536 bits group size, and the SHA-1 hash function. In addition to authentication and encryption, OTR provides forward secrecy and malleable encryption.

The primary motivation behind the protocol was providing deniable authentication for the conversation participants while keeping conversations confidential, like a private conversation in real life, or off the record in journalism sourcing. This is in contrast with cryptography tools that produce output which can be later used as a verifiable record of the communication event and the identities of the participants. The initial introductory paper was named "Off-the-Record Communication, or, Why Not to Use PGP".

The OTR protocol was designed by cryptographers Ian Goldberg and Nikita Borisov and released on 26 October 2004. They provide a client library to facilitate support for instant messaging client developers who want to implement the protocol. A Pidgin and Kopete plugin exists that allows OTR to be used over any IM protocol supported by Pidgin or Kopete, offering an auto-detection feature that starts the OTR session with the buddies that have it enabled, without interfering with regular, unencrypted conversations. Version 4 of the protocol has been in development since 2017 by a team led by Sofía Celi, and reviewed by Nik Unger and Ian Goldberg. This version aims to provide online and offline deniability, to update the cryptographic primitives, and to support out-of-order delivery and asynchronous communication.

According to classified NSA documents published in the Der Spiegel article on 28 December 2014, the NSA intercepted a conversation between two users, but messages could not be decrypted by the NSA because the users were using the OTR protocol.

== History ==
OTR was presented in 2004 by Nikita Borisov, Ian Avrum Goldberg, and Eric A. Brewer as an improvement over the OpenPGP and the S/MIME system at the "Workshop on Privacy in the Electronic Society" (WPES). The first version 0.8.0 of the reference implementation was published on 21 November 2004. In 2005 an analysis was presented by Mario Di Raimondo, Rosario Gennaro, and Hugo Krawczyk that called attention to several vulnerabilities and proposed appropriate fixes, most notably including a flaw in the key exchange. As a result, version 2 of the OTR protocol was published in 2005 implementing a variation of the proposed modification that also hides the public keys. Moreover, the possibility to fragment OTR messages was introduced in order to deal with chat systems that have a limited message size, and a simpler method of verification against man-in-the-middle attacks was implemented.

In 2007 Olivier Goffart published mod_otr for ejabberd, making it possible to perform man-in-the-middle attacks on OTR users who don't check key fingerprints. OTR developers countered this attack by introducing a socialist millionaire protocol implementation in libotr. Instead of comparing key checksums, knowledge of an arbitrary shared secret can be utilised for which relatively low entropy can be tolerated.

Version 3 of the protocol was published in 2012. As a measure against the repeated reestablishment of a session in case of several competing chat clients being signed on to the same user address at the same time, more precise identification labels for sending and receiving client instances were introduced in version 3. Moreover, an additional key is negotiated which can be used for another data channel.

Several solutions have been proposed for supporting conversations with multiple participants. A method proposed in 2007 by Jiang Bian, Remzi Seker, and Umit Topaloglu uses the system of one participant as a "virtual server". The method called "Multi-party Off-the-Record Messaging" (mpOTR) which was published in 2009 works without a central management host and was introduced in Cryptocat by Ian Goldberg et al.

In 2013, the Signal Protocol was introduced, which is based on OTR Messaging and the Silent Circle Instant Messaging Protocol (SCIMP). It brought about support for asynchronous communication ("offline messages") as its major new feature, as well as better resilience with distorted order of messages and simpler support for conversations with multiple participants. OMEMO, introduced in an Android XMPP client called Conversations in 2015, integrates the Double Ratchet Algorithm used in Signal into the instant messaging protocol XMPP ("Jabber") and also enables encryption of file transfers. In the autumn of 2015 it was submitted to the XMPP Standards Foundation for standardisation.

Currently, version 4 of the protocol has been designed. It was presented by Sofía Celi and Ola Bini on PETS2018.

== Implementation ==
In addition to providing encryption and authentication — features also provided by typical public-key cryptography suites, such as PGP, GnuPG, and X.509 (S/MIME) — OTR also offers some less common features:

Forward secrecy
Messages are only encrypted with temporary per-message AES keys, negotiated using the Diffie–Hellman key exchange protocol. The compromise of any long-lived cryptographic keys does not compromise any previous conversations, even if an attacker is in possession of ciphertexts.
Deniable authentication
Messages in a conversation do not have digital signatures, and after a conversation is complete, anyone is able to forge a message to appear to have come from one of the participants in the conversation, assuring that it is impossible to prove that a specific message came from a specific person. Within the conversation the recipient can be sure that a message is coming from the person they have identified.

== Authentication ==
As of OTR 3.1, the protocol supports mutual authentication of users using a shared secret through the socialist millionaire protocol. This feature makes it possible for users to verify the identity of the remote party and avoid a man-in-the-middle attack without the inconvenience of manually comparing public key fingerprints through an outside channel.

== Limitations ==
Due to limitations of the protocol, OTR does not support multi-user group chat as of 2009 but it may be implemented in the future. As of version 3 of the protocol specification, during authenticated key exchanges an extra symmetric key is derived that can be used for secure communication (e.g., encrypted file transfers) over a different channel. Support for encrypted audio or video is not planned. (SRTP with ZRTP exists for that purpose.) A project to produce a protocol for multi-party off-the-record messaging (mpOTR) has been organized by Cryptocat, eQualitie, and other contributors, including Ian Goldberg.

Since the OTR protocol v3 (libotr 4.0.0) the plugin supports multiple OTR conversations with the same buddy who is logged in at multiple locations.

== Client support ==
libotr
- Developer: OTR Development Team
- Stable release: 4.1.1 / 9 March 2016; 10 years ago
- Written in: C
- Operating system: Cross-platform
- Type: Software Library
- License: LGPL v2.1+
- Website: otr.cypherpunks.ca/index.php#downloads

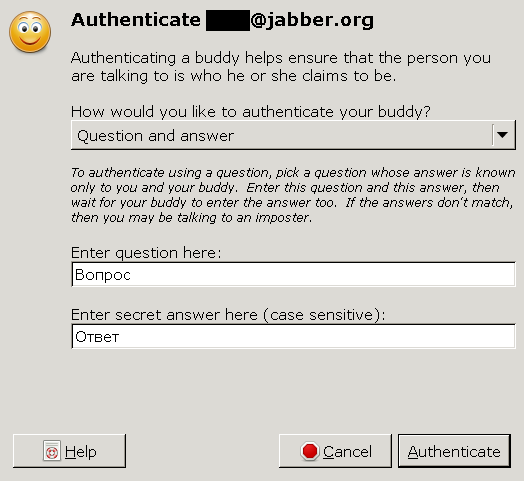
Off-the-Record authentication in Pidgin, using the Socialist millionaires protocol

These clients support Off-the-Record Messaging out of the box or via plug-ins.

- Adium (OS X)
- Another.IM
- BitlBee (cross-platform), since 3.0 (optional at compile time)
- Blink SIP client (OS X)
- CenterIM (Unix-like), since 4.22.2
- ChatSecure (iOS)
- CoyIM
- HexChat, for *nix versions, with a third-party plugin
- HexChat, with a third-party plugin
- Jitsi (cross-platform)
- Kopete (Unix-like)
- Miranda NG (Microsoft Windows), with a third-party plugin
- monocles chat, XMPP client supports OTR since 2022
- Mozilla Thunderbird, since 68
- Pidgin (cross-platform), with a plugin available from the OTR homepage
- Profanity, since 0.4.1
- Psi (cross-platform)
- Spark
- Zom Mobile Messenger (Android)
- Tkabber (cross-platform), since version 1.1
- WeeChat, with a third-party plugin
- climm (Unix-like), since (mICQ) 0.5.4
- irssi, since 1.2.0
