= Xabber =

Open source instant messaging software

- Stable release: 2.6.6 / 7 October 2019; 6 years ago
- Repository: github.com/redsolution/xabber-android
- Operating system: Android
- Licence: GPL v3
- Website: www.xabber.com

Xabber (from XMPP and Jabber) is a XMPP client for the Android Operating System. It is developed as an open source Project on GitHub and is licensed under the GNU GPL v.3 license. The original developers are from a software company called Redsolution, Inc.

Xabber supports Off-the-Record Messaging to provide encrypted communication. Until 30 January 2013 was closed source, but was then published on GitHub as a decision by the development team.

== Functionality ==
Because Xabber implements XMPP Protocols, it is compatible with any XMPP Server. Xabber offers no server infrastructure of its own, but it has a few popular services pre-configured. The developers confirmed compatibility with Ejabberd, Prosody and Openfire. The application has integration with the systemwide Android Contacts.

Xabber uses Off the Record Messaging in combination TLS to provide strong Security (Perfect Forward Secrecy). Since 30 September 2013 Xabber uses Orbot as an additional Layer of Protection. Orbot is used to access the Tor Network to obfuscate the connections between sender and recipient. When used in conjunction with a privately owned XMPP Server the system is less insecure.

== Extensions ==
Xabber supports the following XMPP protocol Extensions:

- RFC-3920: Core
- RFC-3921: Instant Messaging and Presence
- XEP-0030: Service Discovery
- XEP-0054: vcard-temp
- XEP-0078: Non-SASL Authentication
- XEP-0085: Chat State Notifications
- XEP-0091: Legacy Delayed Delivery
- XEP-0115: Entity Capabilities
- XEP-0128: Service Discovery Extensions
- XEP-0138: Stream Compression
- XEP-0147: XMPP URI Scheme Query Components
- XEP-0153: vCard-Based Avatars
- XEP-0184: Message Delivery Receipts
- XEP-0199: XMPP Ping
- XEP-0203: Delayed Delivery

XEP (XMPP Extension Protocols) are standardized extensions for XMPP. The full details on the extensions can be found at xmpp.org/extensions.

== See also ==
- Comparison of instant messaging clients
