= .im =

Internet country code top-level domain for the Isle of Man

- Introduced: 11 September 1996
- TLD type: Country code top-level domain
- Status: Active
- Registry: Domicilium
- Sponsor: Government of the Isle of Man
- Intended use: Entities connected with the Isle of Man
- Actual use: Sees use in the Isle of Man. Also used as personal domain names for instant messaging users, instant messaging websites, and trademarks
- Registration restrictions: None
- Structure: Direct second-level registrations are allowed; some second-level domains such as gov.im are reserved for third-level domains representing entities in the Isle of Man
- Dispute policies: IM Dispute Resolution Procedure (IM DRP)
- DNSSEC: No
- Registry website: nic.im

.im is the Internet country code top-level domain (ccTLD) for the Isle of Man. It is administered by the Government of the Isle of Man and managed on a day-to-day basis by Domicilium, an offshore Internet Service Provider based on the Isle of Man.

== History ==
On 1 July 2006, .im registration was made available to anyone in the world, including one, two, and three letter domains directly under .im, which opens up the possibility of .im domain hacks.

== Domain hacks ==
The domain has gained popularity among companies who produce instant messaging (IM) software with names registered by Adium, ejabberd, Coccinella, Gitter, Meebo, Pandion, Pidgin, Prosody, Trillian, and Yahoo! among others. It is also used by the website elgooG.

.IM is also used in German-, French- and Italian-speaking countries (i.e. Germany, Austria, Luxemburg, Switzerland, France, Italy and part of Belgium) for real estate purposes (German: Immobilien; French: Immobilier; Italian: Immobiliare). The abundance of available short names has also made the domain popular for personal use.

== Registration ==
Currently, domain registrations cost £40.00 per year for domains of three letters or more, although they can be purchased much more cheaply through resellers. Premium domains with two character names are available for £495.00, and premium domains with one character names are available for £995.00.

== Second-level domain names ==
- .ac.im, reserved for academic institutions
- .co.im and its third-level subdomains:
  - .ltd.co.im
  - .plc.co.im
- .com.im
- .gov.im, reserved for the Government of the Isle of Man
- .net.im, intended for network operators and others in networking or the online space
- .org.im, intended for nonprofit organisations

== See also ==
- .uk
