= Farstream =

Multimedia framework

- Original author: Collabora
- Release: 2006; 20 years ago
- Stable release: 0.2.9 / 12 March 2020; 6 years ago
- Written in: C GLib
- Platform: Cross-platform
- Type: telecommunication technology
- License: GNU Lesser General Public License
- Website: www.freedesktop.org/wiki/Software/Farstream

Farstream (previously known as Farsight) is an audio/video conferencing framework based on GStreamer. The project provides audio/video conferencing for as many instant messengers as possible through a modular design. Telepathy and Farsight constitute the first implementation of the Jingle XMPP protocol.

The software is open-source, being distributed under the GNU Lesser General Public License (LGPL) and is intended to run on POSIX-compliant operating systems, including Linux but also Windows and Mac OS X. It is being used for audio/video conferencing on the Nokia 770, N800, N810 and N900. It is also the VoIP framework used by Meego.

Farsight is under development in the Farsight 2 series. The maintainer is Olivier Crête.

Examples of applications using Farstream:

- Pidgin
- Empathy
- aMSN
- MeeGo
- Gajim
- Minbif
