= Spark (XMPP client) =

Instant messaging client

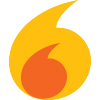

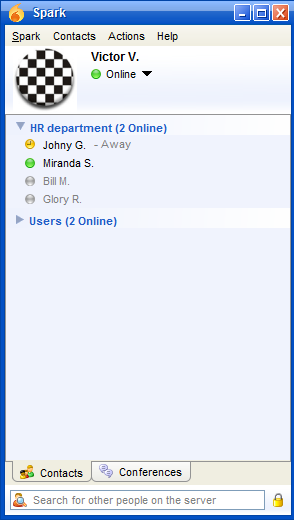
- Spark roster window
- Developer: Ignite Realtime
- Stable release: 3.0.2 / 31 March 2023
- Preview release: 3.0.0-beta / 26 April 2021
- Written in: Java
- Platform: Cross-platform
- Type: XMPP client
- License: Apache-2.0
- Website: www.igniterealtime.org/projects/spark/index.jsp
- Repository: github.com/igniterealtime/Spark

Spark is an open-source instant messaging program (based on the XMPP protocol) optimized for businesses and organizations.

It can be integrated with the Openfire server to provide additional features such as controlling the various Spark functionalities from a central management console or integrating with a proprietary customer support service known as Fastpath which allows its users to interact with the platform using the Spark client.

Being a cross-platform application, Spark can run on various systems. Installers for Windows, macOS and Linux are available on the official website. The server is JRE-based, where the client is not. The Spark xmpp-client supports neither Jingle nor Omemo encryption.

== History ==
Previously known as Jive Communicator, Spark was designed by Jive Software with a lightweight graphical design and simplistic user interface for business usage. Later, it was open-sourced and donated to the Ignite Realtime community, along with Openfire, for further improvement and development.

== Features ==
Spark is based on the open-source Smack API library, also developed by Ignite Realtime. It has a tabbed interface for managing conversations, a quick and full history, and a search feature inside the contacts window which is designed for organizations with many units and employees. Other features include shortcuts to access recent and favorite contacts.

Spark supports ad hoc and regular group chats. It also supports TLS encryption, and additionally provides an option to use Off-the-Record Messaging for end-to-end encryption. Though it is designed to work with XMPP servers, it can also integrate with IM Gateway to connect with many other IM networks.

The software’s user interface is intended to be lightweight with FlatLaf themes, tabbed conversations and plugin support. It contains single sign-on and file transfer capability, as well as privacy list.

== See also ==
- Extensible Messaging and Presence Protocol
