= ObscuraCam =

Security application for Android

- Developers: The Guardian Project, WITNESS
- Release: 2010
- Stable release: 5.0.0-beta-1 / 24 July 2021; 5 years ago
- Operating system: Android
- License: GNU GPLv3
- Website: guardianproject.info/apps/org.witness.sscphase1/
- Repository: github.com/guardianproject/ObscuraCam

ObscuraCam was an Android application developed by Guardian Project and WITNESS. It anonymizes pictures and videos by editing faces and deleting metadata.

== Overview ==
ObscuraCam was an Android application developed by the Guardian Project and WITNESS and released in 2010. It was released under GPL-3.0 license and available for download on Google Play and F-Droid. The program was created to help human rights groups, activists, and journalists anonymize pictures and videos. It was largely funded by Google. The app is part of SecureSmartCam project.

== Functionality ==
ObscuraCam allows the user to anonymize pictures and videos. The program automatically identifies faces and pixelates, applies a Groucho Marx-style disguise, blurs or erases them completely. In case the face detection algorithm fails, it is possible to manually select the face and disguise it. It also erases all exif metadata from the archives and stores them in a special folder.

The first version of the app was only capable of bluring pictures. The second version was also capable of editing videos.

== Awards ==
| Year | Award | Category | Result | Ref. |
|---|---|---|---|---|
| 2013 | Knight News Challenge | | Won | |

== See also ==
- Metadata removal tool
