= Jeremie Miller =

American computer programmer

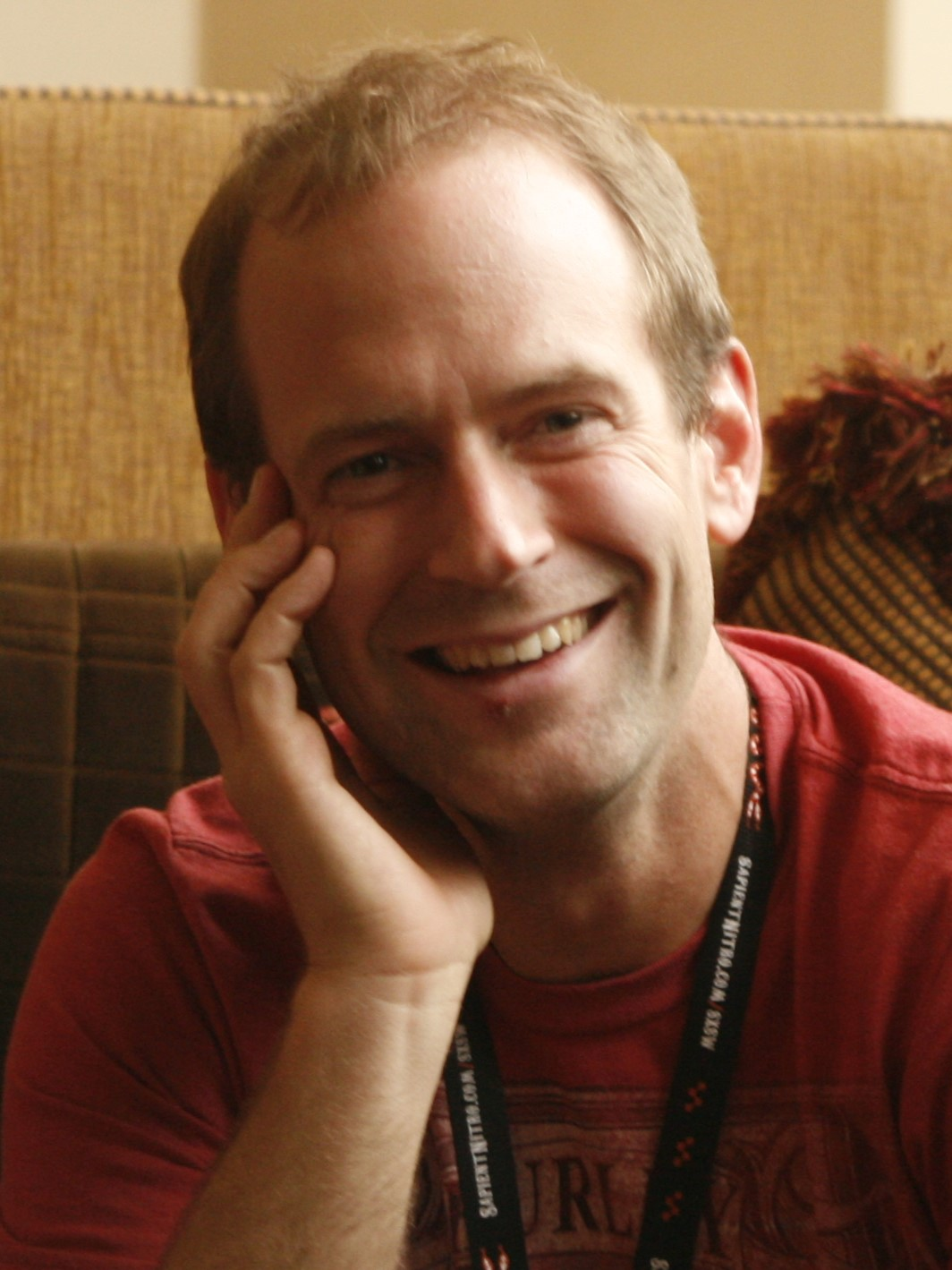
- Jeremie Miller in 2011
- Born: c. 1975 (age 50–51); Cascade, Iowa, U.S.
- Occupation: Software developer
- Years active: 1998–present
- Organization: Bluesky Social, PBC
- Known for: Inventor of the Extensible Messaging and Presence Protocol
- Works: Jabber.org, XMPP, Locker, Telehash
- Website: GitHub

Jeremie Miller (born c. 1975) is an American software developer and entrepreneur best known for his role in the development of Jabber and the release of jabberd, an early implementation of an XMPP server, in 1999. His work contributed to the standardization of the Extensible Messaging and Presence Protocol (XMPP) by the Internet Engineering Task Force in 2004, and variations of XMPP have since been implemented on WhatsApp, Kik Messenger, and Zoom.

In 2007, Miller became the technical lead for Wikia Search, an open-source search engine initiative. He later co-founded Singly, Inc. in 2010, which introduced Telehash and Locker. The company was later acquired by Appcelerator in 2013. Currently, Miller sits on the board of directors for Bluesky, a social media platform.

== Biography ==
Miller is from Cascade, Iowa, and lives in Denver, Colorado.

Miller began developing software on his farm in Iowa. He attended Iowa State University where he studied computer and electrical design. He broke off his studies early in 1995 to join an Internet startup company.

He began working on Jabber in 1998, and later released jabberd, the first implementation of an XMPP server, on January 4, 1999. He also wrote one of the first XML parsers in JavaScript. The release of jabberd 1.0 in May 2000, including protocols for real-time XML streaming by Jeremie Miller and the open-source community, were the basis for XMPP when it was standardized by the Internet Engineering Task Force in RFC 3920 and RFC 3921 during October 2004. Variations of XMPP based on Miller's work have since been adopted by WhatsApp, Kik Messenger, and Zoom (software).

In May 2007, he was hired at Wikia to be technical lead for a project to create an open search engine called Wikia Search. Miller co-founded a company called Singly in 2010, which announced the Locker Project in 2011 and TeleHash projects.

Singly was acquired by Appcelerator in August 2013 on undisclosed terms.
