= Guardian Project (software) =

Open source security software project

- Motto: People, Apps and Code You Can Trust
- Commercial?: No
- Type of project: Research and development, Open-source software, Encryption software, Mobile security, Internet privacy
- Founder: Nathan Freitas
- Established: 2009
- Website: guardianproject.info

The Guardian Project is a global collective of software developers, designers, advocates, activists, and trainers who develop open-source mobile security software and operating system enhancements. They also create customized mobile devices to help individuals communicate more freely and protect themselves from intrusion and monitoring. The effort specifically focuses on users who live or work in high-risk situations and who often face constant surveillance and intrusion attempts into their mobile devices and communication streams.

== History ==
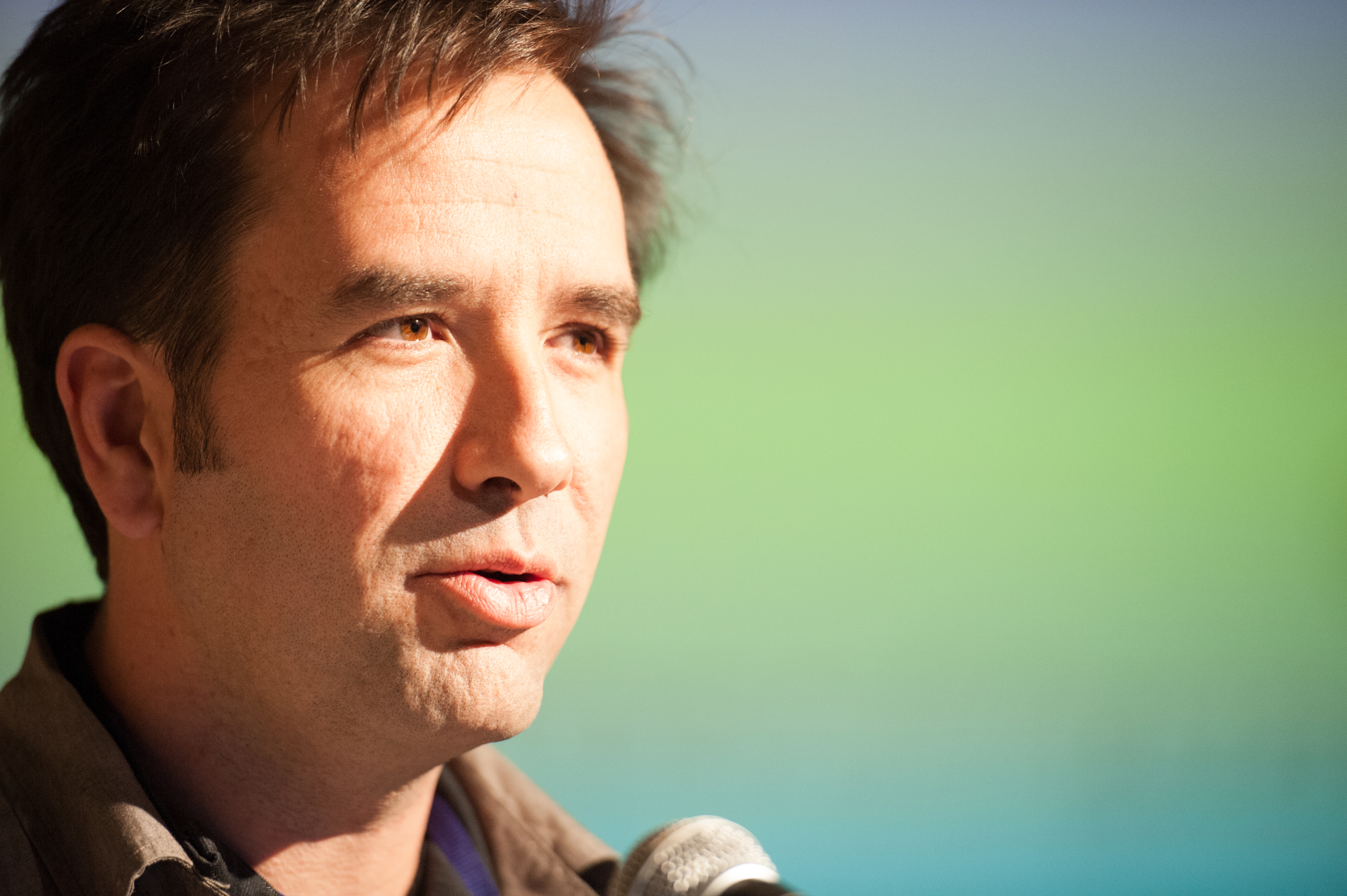
Founder Nathan Freitas speaking at the Unlike Us conference in 2013

Guardian Project was founded by Nathan Freitas in 2009 in Brooklyn, NY. Since it was founded, Guardian Project has developed more than a dozen mobile applications for Android and iOS with over two million downloads and hundreds of thousands of active users. It has also partnered with prominent open source software projects, activists groups, NGOs, commercial partners and news organizations to support their mobile security software capabilities.

In November 2014, "ChatSecure + Orbot" received a top score on the Electronic Frontier Foundation's secure messaging scorecard, along with Cryptocat, TextSecure, "Signal / RedPhone", Silent Phone, and Silent Text. "Jitsi + Ostel" scored 6 out of 7 points on the Electronic Frontier Foundation's secure messaging scorecard. They lost a point because there has not been a recent independent code audit.

In March 2016, Guardian Project announced a partnership with F-Droid and CopperheadOS with the goal of creating "a solution that can be verifiably trusted from the operating system, through the network and network services, all the way up to the app stores and apps themselves".

== Funding ==
Guardian Project has received funding from Google, UC Berkeley with the MacArthur Foundation, Avaaz, Internews, Open Technology Fund, WITNESS, the Knight Foundation, Benetech, ISC Project and Free Press Unlimited.

Through work on partner projects like the Tor Project, Commotion mesh and StoryMaker, the Project has received indirect funding both from the US State Department (through the Bureau of Democracy, Human Rights and Labor Internet Freedom program) and from the Dutch Ministry of Foreign Affairs (through HIVOS).

== Projects ==
=== Active ===
Orbot

- Orbot: A Tor client for Android. Tor uses Onion Routing to provide access to network services that may be blocked, censored or monitored, while also protecting the identity of the user requesting those resources. Often Orbot is installed with orWall, an app which takes the lead on the firewall and then add the required iptables rules for traffic shaping in order to allow Orbot traffic, and force the selected applications to be redirected to the Orbot TransPort. Instead of Orbot, AFWall+, available on F-Droid and Google Play app repository, is an alternative choice recommended for re-routing outbound traffic back through the local Tor port, even with iptables rules, and with a virtual private network like OpenVPN. Finally, NetCipher SDK is the app developed by Guardian Project for users interested in enabling theirs apps working directly with Orbot (and thus with Orfox Tor browser).
- ObscuraCam: A secure camera app that can obscure, encrypt or destroy pixels within an image. This project is in partnership with WITNESS, a human rights video advocacy and training organization.
- Haven – free and open-source Android security application designed to monitor activity happening around a device using its built-in sensors, and to alert the device owner of such activity. Co-developed with Edward Snowden under the auspices of the Freedom of the Press Foundation.

=== Discontinued ===
- Orfox: A mobile counterpart of the Tor Browser. Guardian Project announced the stable alpha of Orfox on 30 June 2015. Orfox is built from Fennec (Firefox for Android) code and the Tor Browser code repository, and is given security hardening patches by the Tor Browser development team. Some of the Orfox build work is based on the Fennec; F-Droid project. In Orfox, the project removed the WebRTC component, Chromecast connectivity, app permissions to access the camera, microphone, contacts (address book), location data (GPS et al.), and NFC. Orfox was to supersede the Orweb browser project, and has in turn been superseded by the Tor Browser for Android.
- Orweb: A privacy enhanced web browser that supports proxies. When used with Orbot, Orweb protects against network analysis, blocks cookies, keeps no local browsing history, and disables Flash to keep the user safe.
- Ostel: A tool for having end-to-end encrypted VoIP calls. This was a public testbed of the Open Secure Telephony Network (OSTN) project, with the goal of promoting the use of free, open protocols, standards and software, to power end-to-end secure voice communications on mobile devices, as well as with desktop computers. This was discontinued in 2017.
- ChatSecure: An instant messaging application integrated with the Off-the-Record encrypted chat protocol. Formerly called Gibberbot, the app is built on Google's open-source Talk app and modified to support the Jabber XMPP protocol. This app was discontinued in December 2016 and recommended Conversations app for similar user experience.

== Distribution ==
Guardian Project offers downloads of its apps from Google Play, Amazon Appstore, Aptoide, directly from their website, and through an F-Droid-compatible repository. Direct downloads are signed and can be verified with the developer's key.
