= Jingle (protocol) =

Peer-to-peer communications protocol

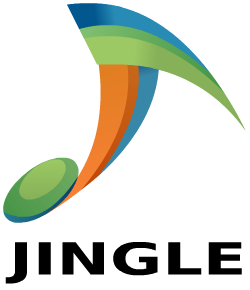
Proposed Jingle logo

Jingle is an extension to XMPP (Extensible Messaging and Presence Protocol) which adds peer-to-peer (P2P) session control (signaling) for multimedia interactions such as in Voice over IP (VoIP) or videoconferencing communications. It was designed by Google and the XMPP Standards Foundation. The multimedia streams are delivered using the Real-time Transport Protocol (RTP). If needed, NAT traversal is assisted using Interactive Connectivity Establishment (ICE).

As of September 2018, the Jingle specification is a Stable Standard, meaning: " Implementations are encouraged and the protocol is appropriate for deployment in production systems, but some changes to the protocol are possible before it becomes a Final Standard."

== Data Flows ==
Data Flows for a client CA on XMPP server SA setting a Jingle session to client CB on XMPP server SB

When Client CA is communicating with Client CB in a chat (i.e. one user communicating with another user, on the same of different servers) they client software on both ends uses the Jingle parts of the XMPP specification to establish if they are both Jingle capable. If they can negotiate a way to talk directly, e.g. over RTP (XEP-0167), then they will generally show the user a Telephone or Video icon, enabling them to establish a direct connection to the other client.

== Libraries ==
The libjingle library, used by Google Talk to implement Jingle, has been released to the public under a BSD license. It implements both the current standard protocol and the older, pre-standard version.

== Clients supporting Jingle ==
- Asterisk PBX (Note: Doesn't support video chat.)
- Conversations (software)
- Dino (software)
- Empathy (using Telepathy framework)
- FreeSWITCH
- Gajim
- Google Talk for Gmail, Android, (Note: Currently supports only older, pre-standard version.) Windows (defunct 2022)
- iChat for Apple OS X (last release 2012)
- Jitsi (multiplatform support using Java)
- KDE Telepathy (using Telepathy framework)
- Kopete
- Miranda NG (via JGTalk plugin)
- Movim
- Pidgin
- Psi
- QIP Infium
- Yate/YateClient supports Jingle in both client and server mode, audio and file transfer, also call transfer and DTMF.

Though not an instant messaging client, RemoteVNC uses Jingle as one of the screen sharing means.

=== Technical Details and Further Resources ===
- XMPP Standards Foundation detailed specification.
- XMPP Standards Foundation overview
- libjingle project documentation on GitHub.
- Interactive Connectivity Establishment (ICE) protocol explanation.
- Real-time Transport Protocol (RTP) overview.
