= IMPP =

IMPP may refer to:

- Inner Mongolian People's Party, a Mongol nationalism political movement
- Instant Messaging and Presence Protocol, an IETF working group
