= PRIM =

PRIM may stand for:

- Presence and Instant Messaging protocol
- Party of the People of Free Indonesia
- PRIM (watches)
