= Prosody (software) =

Cross-platform XMPP server written in Lua

- Developer: Prosody dev team
- Initial release: December 3, 2008
- Stable release: 13.0.2 / 29 May 2025
- Written in: Lua
- Operating system: Cross-platform
- Type: XMPP server
- License: MIT License
- Website: https://prosody.im
- Repository: hg.prosody.im

Prosody (formerly lxmppd) is a cross-platform XMPP server written in Lua. Its development goals include low resource usage, ease of use, and extensibility. Prosody uses the default XMPP ports, 5222 and 5269, for client-to-server and server-to-server communications respectively.

== History ==
Prosody development was started by Matthew Wild in August 2008 and its first release, 0.1.0, was made in December 2008.

Prosody was initially licensed under the GNU General Public License (version 2), but later switched to the MIT License in its 3rd release.

== Notable deployments ==
The XMPP Standards Foundation runs Prosody on xmpp.org, and uses the chatroom feature for meetings for various XSF teams.

Identi.ca the micro-blogging service uses Prosody to deliver IM notifications.

Remember the Milk uses Prosody to deliver IM based reminders.

Collabora runs Prosody on proxies.telepathy.im to provide file transfer proxy lookup for Telepathy (and therefore Empathy).

Peter Saint-Andre (the executive director of the XMPP Standards Foundation) has run Prosody on http://stpeter.im.

In 2023, Jabber.org finished migrating to Prosody.

== See also ==
- Metronome IM
