= KDE Telepathy =

Instant messaging and voice over IP client

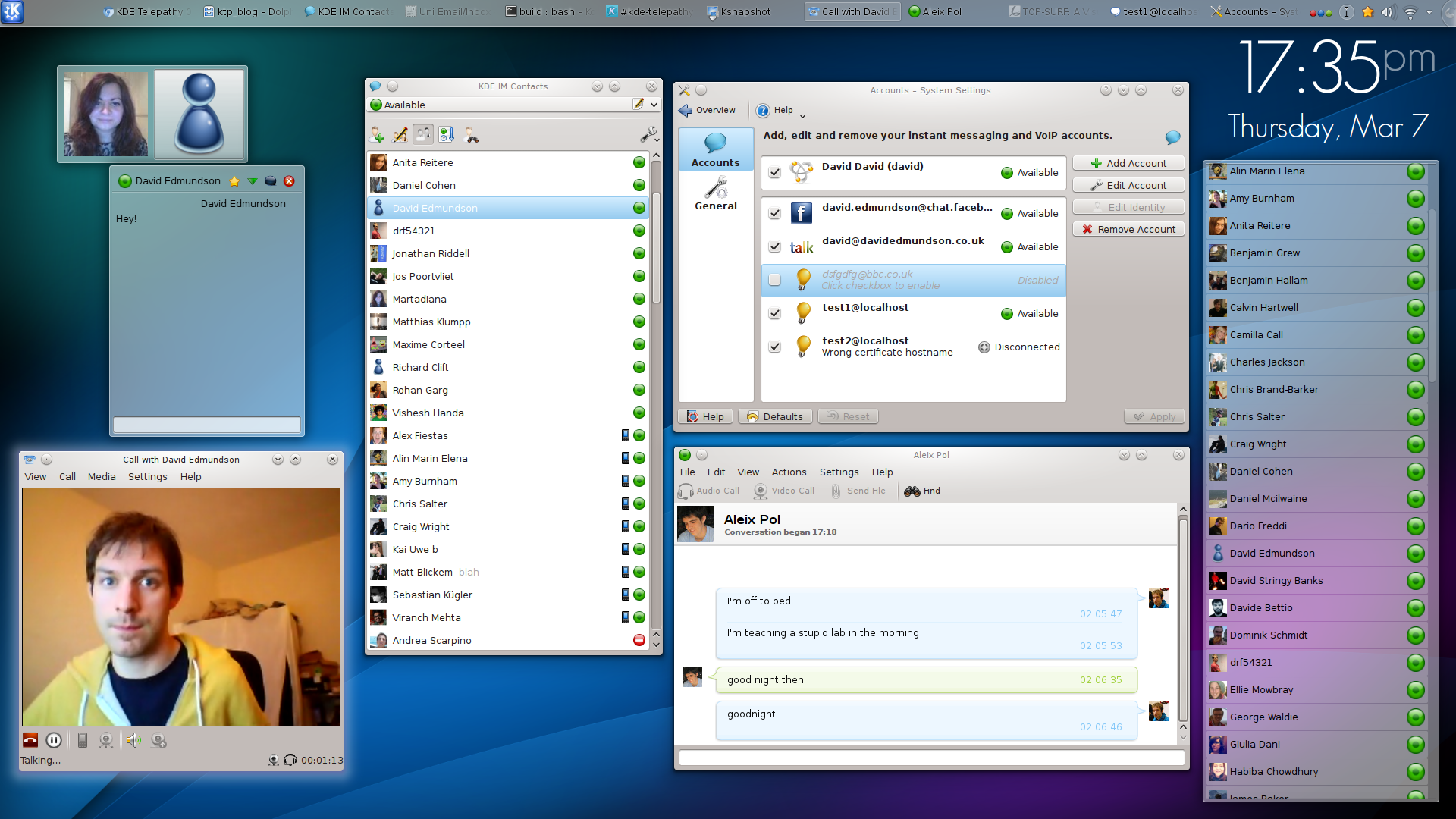
- Screenshot of Telepathy v0.6
- Developer: KDE
- Initial release: July 27, 2011; 14 years ago
- Final release: 0.9.0 / October 19, 2014; 11 years ago
- Written in: C++, QML
- Operating system: Unix-like
- Available in: Multilingual
- Type: Instant messaging client
- License: GNU GPL
- Website: community.kde.org/KTp

KDE Telepathy (sometimes abbreviated as KTp) was an instant messaging (IM) client which supported text-, voice- and video-based communication as well as file transfers over various IM protocols. It used the Freedesktop.org Telepathy framework as its back-end and was the replacement for Kopete, focused on improving the integration between different components of the KDE Software Compilation that may benefit from real-time communication and collaboration features. The project was designated "Unmaintained" in 2016 and the related source code repositories were made read-only in 2023.

== Themes ==
KDE Telepathy has support for Adium themes. They can be installed from the Adium website's Xtras page's Themes category. They are installed over ktp-adiumxtra-protocol-handler

== Protocol support ==
- Gadu-Gadu - over telepathy-haze
- ICQ - over telepathy-haze
- OSCAR (used by AOL Instant Messenger) - over telepathy-haze
- Skype - over telepathy-haze
- Skype for Business - over telepathy-haze
- Telegram Messenger - over telepathy-morse
- XMPP - over telepathy-gabble (broken X-OAuth2)
- Yahoo Messenger - over telepathy-haze
- Zeroconf - over telepathy-salut

== See also ==
- Comparison of instant messaging clients
- Comparison of Internet Relay Chat clients
