= Jabber.org =

Instant messaging software

Jabber.org is a public, free instant messaging (IM) and presence service, based on XMPP, an open standard for IM.

== History ==
Jabber.org was started in 1999 and has offered free instant messaging continuously since. It originally served as the development test bed for the jabberd project, the original Jabber/XMPP server. After becoming more stable it also became more popular with end users. As of 2012, it was a public production service, and one of the biggest nodes on the open XMPP network, with an average of 17,000 users logged in at a time.

Jabber.org originally ran on what is now known as Jabberd14. In 2006 the service was migrated to ejabberd on which it ran until 2010. In 2010 the service was migrated to Isode Limited's M-Link XMPP Server. Which was then migrated to Prosody in 2023 resulting in slight account disruption.

Originally, Jabber.org also offered Jabber accounts. Since June 25, 2013 it stopped offering new accounts although it supports Jabber/XMPP accounts created by other services.
