= Locker (software) =

Open source software package

The Locker project was an open source software project for users to record that was called a "digital wake": the sites they visit, the purchases they make, and other activities.

== History ==
A company called Singly was funding development of Locker, in the belief that third-party developers would build applications, such as recommender systems, using it. Singly was founded by Jeremie Miller, creator of XMPP, Jason Cavnar and Simon Murtha-Smith in 2010 in San Francisco. Matt Zimmerman, former CTO of Ubuntu, joined Singly in May 2011. In 2011 Singly joined a personal data ecosystem consortium, which existed through about 2013.

Locker was free software under a BSD license on GitHub. It was intended that users would be able to control which parts of their locker they share with their social network and companies they interact with. Developers could write connectors to pipe data in from a website such as Flickr, or a local application such as a web browser. Alternatively, they can write Synclets, which are a more lightweight alternative to connectors. The Locker development team started writing code to use the TeleHash protocol (initially created by Miller) to distribute data directly between contacts in a peer-to-peer manner, without the need for centralized servers.

By the end of 2012, the company shifted its focus to a mobile device application integration service, with a test period announced in December. Singly was acquired by Appcelerator in August 2013 for undisclosed terms. The Locker project website was maintained through about 2015, saying still it was "under development".

== See also ==
- FriendFeed
- Greplin
