= ChatSecure =

Messaging application

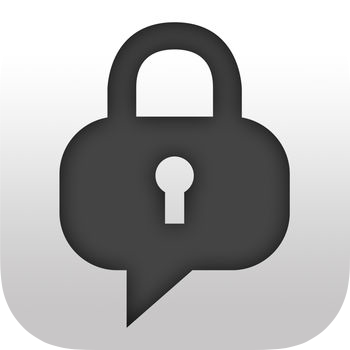
- Original author(s): Chris Ballinger
- Developer(s): Chris Ballinger, David Chiles, and contributors
- Initial release: 1.0.2 / February 27, 2012; 13 years ago
- Stable release: 5.0.4 / August 13, 2021; 4 years ago
- Repository: github.com/chatsecure
- Written in: Objective-C, Swift
- Operating system: iOS
- Size: 10.7 MB
- Available in: 30 languages
- Type: Communication
- License: GPL-3.0-or-later
- Website: chatsecure.org

ChatSecure is a messaging application for iOS which allows OTR and OMEMO encryption for the XMPP protocol. ChatSecure is free and open source software available under the GPL-3.0-or-later license.

ChatSecure has been used by international individuals and governments, businesses, and those spreading jihadi propaganda.

The app has not been maintained since 2021.

== History ==
ChatSecure was originally released in 2011, and was the first iOS application to support OTR messaging. In 2012, ChatSecure formed a partnership with The Guardian Project and the Gibberbot app was rebranded to "ChatSecure Android".

In late 2016, the Android branding partnership was ended, with ChatSecure Android becoming 'Zom', and ChatSecure iOS remaining as ChatSecure. ChatSecure iOS remains in active development and is unaffected by this change. Version 4.0 was released on January 17, 2017.

ChatSecure is censored from the App Store in China.

== Reception ==
In November 2014, "ChatSecure + Orbot" received a perfect score on the Electronic Frontier Foundation's "Secure Messaging Scorecard"; the combination received points for having communications encrypted in transit, having communications encrypted with keys the provider doesn't have access to (end-to-end encryption), making it possible for users to independently verify their correspondents' identities, having past communications secure if the keys are stolen (forward secrecy), having the code open to independent review (open source), having the security designs well-documented, and having a recent independent security audit.

== See also ==
- Comparison of instant messaging clients
- List of free and open-source iOS applications
