= Empathy (software) =

Open source instant messaging and VoIP client

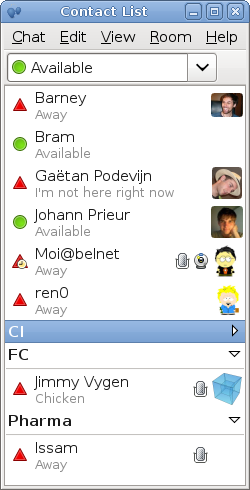
- Screenshot
- Original author: Xavier Claessens
- Developers: Guillaume Desmottes, Xavier Claessens
- Final release: 3.12.14 / 26 August 2017
- Written in: C
- Operating system: BSD, Linux, Other Unix-like
- Available in: Multilingual
- Type: Instant messaging client
- License: GPL-2.0-or-later
- Website: wiki.gnome.org/Attic/Empathy
- Repository: gitlab.gnome.org/Archive/empathy

Empathy is a discontinued instant messaging (IM) and voice over IP (VoIP) client which supports text, voice, video, file transfers, and inter-application communication over various IM communication protocols.

Empathy was created by forking the Gossip project started by Michael Hallendal, Richard Hult and later maintained by Martyn Russell. It was forked because there were disagreements amongst contributors about the backend at the time. It was initially completely XMPP based (similar to Google Talk and Facebook's chat implementations), but others wanted it to use the Telepathy stack. This led to the forking and new name Empathy.

Empathy also provides a collection of reusable graphical user interface widgets for developing instant messaging clients for the GNOME desktop. It is written as extension to the Telepathy framework, for connecting to different instant messaging networks with a unified user interface.

Version 0.12 was released in 2007. Empathy has been included in the GNOME desktop since its version 2.24, in Ubuntu since version 9.10 (Karmic Koala), and in Fedora since version 12 (Constantine); Empathy has replaced Pidgin as their default messenger application.

Empathy is no longer under development by the GNOME team.

== Features ==
Empathy natively supports protocols, implemented in Telepathy framework: XMPP (including configuration for Facebook IM, Google Talk, though Gizmo5, LiveJournal Talk, Nokia Ovi and other Jabber servers also supported), salut link-local XMPP for local network peer discovery, MSNP (to Microsoft Messenger service as used by MSN Messenger or Windows Live Messenger), IRC and SIP. Additional protocols are supported with libpurple plug-in: OSCAR (AIM/ICQ/MobileMe), Bonjour (Apple's implementation of Zeroconf), MySpaceIM, QQ, MXit, Novell GroupWise, YMSG, Gadu-Gadu, Lotus Sametime, SIMPLE, SILC, Zephyr.

Automatic features include auto away and extended away using gnome-screensaver, and auto re-connect using NetworkManager. One-on-one and group chats include smileys and spell checking. Conversation windows can be themed. Conversations can be logged, which can be viewed or searched, and prepended to new chats.

Additional features include:

- Voice and video calls using SIP, MSNP and XMPP (including support for Google Talk voice calls)
- File transfer for XMPP
- Geolocation of contacts (can display contacts on a map)
- Python bindings for Telepathy
- Collaborative work using Tubes
- Desktop sharing (remote control)
- Automatic configuration of Google Talk accounts (with GNOME Online Accounts)

== Reception ==
Ryan Paul at Ars Technica wrote in March 2009, "Empathy's highly modular design, basic video chat capabilities, and excellent support for desktop integration are all major assets." He stated that it had "improved", but it was "rough around the edges", noting that at the time it had not yet "been included in any major Linux distribution" citing an Ubuntu usability study.

In November 2009, after Empathy replaced Pidgin (and Ekiga) in Ubuntu 9.10, Ryan wrote: "Although Empathy has improved a lot over the past year, it's still not stable. It crashed quite a few times during my tests and exhibited a number of other minor bugs. It's adequate for basic chatting…". In his extended review of Ubuntu 9.10, Igor ǈubunčić was terse about the switch from Pidgin to Empathy: "Personally, I see no value in the change, especially since Empathy supports less networks." Tom's Hardware reviewer Adam Overa referred to the switch to the "much less popular and compatible Empathy client", as "[p]robably the most controversial change in Ubuntu 9.10", noting that a "firestorm of debate has been raging over this topic among developers and users alike ever since the announcement to replace Pidgin was made…" in 2009.

In 2010, Empathy was listed as one of "5 open source VoIP softphones to watch" by Rodney Gedda of Computerworld magazine.

== Security ==
Unlike clients supporting Off-the-Record Messaging (OTR), Empathy lacks privacy and security facilities enforced through technical means. Empathy's developers do not consider it within the client's scope to implement OTR, while leaving the possibility of supporting potential future protocol-level encryption standards open.

== See also ==
- Comparison of instant messaging clients
- Comparison of Internet Relay Chat clients
- Comparison of VoIP software
