= Presence and Instant Messaging =

Presence and Instant Messaging (PRIM) was an early proposal to the IETF of a standard protocol for instant messaging.

The abstract model was first published as a pair of IETF Request for Comments, RFC 2778 "A Model for Presence and Instant Messaging" and RFC 2779 "Instant Messaging / Presence Protocol Requirements" in February 2000, which was authored by Mark Day of SightPath (formerly of Lotus Development where helped develop IBM Lotus Sametime, now Chief Scientist at Riverbed Technology), Jonathan Rosenberg of dynamicsoft (now the Chief Technology Officer and Vice President of Collaboration at Cisco Systems) and Hiroyasu Sugano of Fujitsu Laboratories LtdLtd.

No work has been done on it since 2001. Currently, SIP and its derivative SIMPLE (both of which Jonathan Rosenberg also co-authored or invented), and XMPP are being considered for use as instant messaging protocols.

These were Informational RFCs, which describe the model and requirements for the way an Instant Messaging Protocol should work on the Internet. A new working group - the Instant Messaging and Presence Protocol group was established to develop the model in more detail.

== See also ==
- Instant Messaging and Presence Protocol (IMPP)
- eXtensible Messaging and Presence Protocol (XMPP)
