= Telehash =

Networking protocol

TeleHash
- Original author(s): Jeremie Miller
- Initial release: first prototype in 2010; 15 years ago
- Stable release: 2.0 / 2013; 12 years ago
- Written in: C, Python, Ruby, Erlang, JavaScript, Go and Objective-C
- Website: telehash.org
- As of: March 31, 2014; 11 years ago

Telehash is a mesh networking protocol that aims to be secure. The protocol is licensed under the Creative Commons Public domain.

Telehash implementations were still in development by 2014. As a security-sensitive application, it has yet to receive a third-party security review. TeleHash is similar to Resilio Sync in that it allows users of the software to share data securely without any central server authority. There are implementations in C, Python, Ruby, Erlang, JavaScript, Go, and Objective-C.

Telehash is used in the Locker project, and was planned to be used as a communication and file transfer mechanism in Git-annex.

== See also ==
- BitTorrent Sync
- Locker (software)
