= Finch (software) =

Console-based instant messenger

- Written in: C
- Platform: Unix-like
- Type: Instant messaging client
- License: GNU General Public License
- Website: developer.pidgin.im/wiki/Using%20Finch

Finch is an open-source console-based instant messaging client, based on the libpurple library. Libpurple has support for many commonly used instant messaging protocols, allowing the user to log in to various services from one application. Finch uses GLib and ncurses.

Finch supports OTR via a libpurple plugin.

== See also ==
- Multiprotocol instant messaging application
- Comparison of instant messaging protocols
- Comparison of instant messaging clients
- Comparison of Internet Relay Chat clients
- Comparison of XMPP clients
- Online chat
