= Profanity (instant messaging client) =

Console-based XMPP client

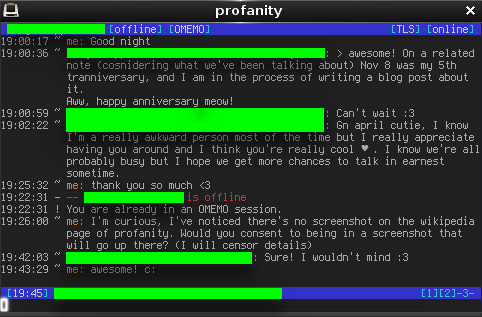
- Profanity 0.15.1
- Developers: James Booth, Michael Vetter
- Initial release: August 2012
- Stable release: 0.15.1 / 22 August 2025
- Written in: C
- Operating system: Windows, macOS, Linux, FreeBSD, Android (via Termux)
- Type: Instant messaging client
- License: GPL-3.0-or-later
- Website: profanity-im.github.io
- Repository: github.com/profanity-im/profanity

Profanity is an instant messaging TUI (terminal user interface) client that supports the XMPP protocol. It supports Linux, macOS, Windows (via Cygwin or WSL), FreeBSD, and Android (via Termux).

Packages are available in the Debian, Ubuntu and Arch Linux distributions.

Features include multi-user chat, desktop notifications, Off The Record and OMEMO message encryption.
