= Openfire =

Instant messaging and groupchat server

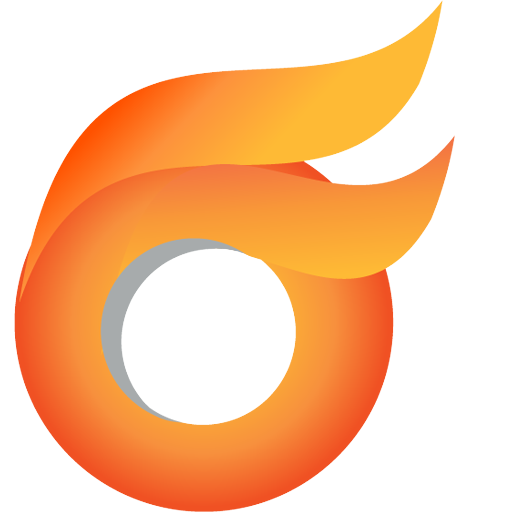

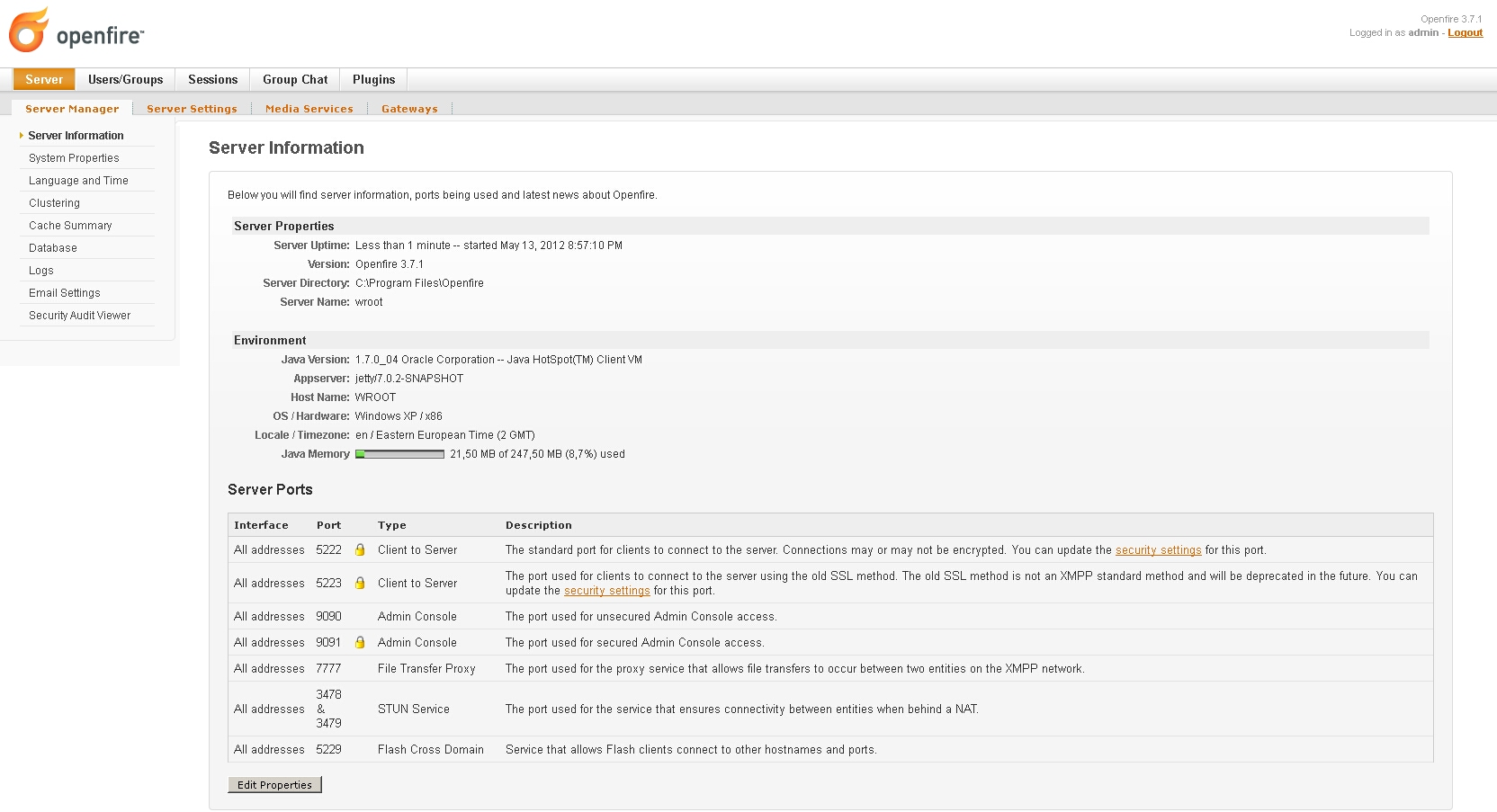
- Openfire Admin Console
- Developer: Ignite Realtime
- Stable release: 5.0.5 / 15 May 2026
- Written in: Java
- Platform: Cross-platform
- Type: XMPP server
- License: Apache-2.0
- Website: www.igniterealtime.org/projects/openfire/
- Repository: github.com/igniterealtime/Openfire

Openfire (previously known as Wildfire, and Jive Messenger) is an instant messaging (IM) and groupchat server for the Extensible Messaging and Presence Protocol (XMPP). It is written in Java and licensed under the Apache License 2.0.

== History ==
The project was originated by Jive Software around 2002, partly in order to support their FastPath web-based customer support tool, as Jive Messenger, and renamed to Wildfire in 2005. Due to a trademark issue, it was further renamed to Openfire in 2007. The project was wholly handed to the community in 2008. Jive continued to host the project until 2016.

== Current Governance ==
After Jive Software handed the Openfire project to the Ignite Realtime community, the Ignite Realtime Foundation was founded to govern its projects. Openfire continued to be developed under a community model, as part of the Ignite Realtime Foundation. The project lead is Guus der Kinderen.

== Web-based administration panel ==
Most administration of the server is done through a web interface, which runs on the ports 9090 (HTTP) and 9091 (HTTPS) by default. Administrators can connect from anywhere and edit the server and configuration settings.

== Features ==
Openfire supports the following features:

- Web-based administration panel
- Plugin interface
- Customizable
- SSL/TLS support
- User-friendly web interface and guided installation
- Database connectivity (i.e. embedded HSQLDB or other DBMS with JDBC 3 driver) for storing messages and user details
- LDAP connectivity
- Platform independent, pure Java
- Full integration with Spark (XMPP client)
- Can support more than 50,000 concurrent users

Openfire has strong support for plugins and customized builds; there are numerous plugins available for immediate download and install via the admin console, and many installations have bespoke plugins.

Openfire allows multiple server instances to work together in one clustered environment. There is an open-source clustering plugin based on open-source Hazelcast technology.

== See also ==
- XMPP
