= Witness (organization) =

WITNESS is a human rights non-profit organization based out of Brooklyn, New York. Its mission is to partner with on-the-ground organizations to support the documentation of human rights violations and their consequences, further public engagement, advocate for policy change, and seek justice. WITNESS has partnered with over 300 human rights groups in more than 80 countries.

== History ==
WITNESS was founded in 1992 by musician and activist Peter Gabriel, along with the assistance of Human Rights First (then known as the Lawyers Committee for Human Rights) and its founding executive director, Michael Posner.

Gabriel was influenced by his experience of using a Sony Handycam, one of the first small camcorders available to consumers, to record the stories he heard while traveling with Amnesty International’s 1988 Human Rights Now! Tour. Gabriel made the decision to establish WITNESS after the 1991 police brutality incident involving Rodney King Jr. The incident gained significant attention due to bystander's video capturing King's beating by the Los Angeles police. To Gabriel, this video demonstrated the power of video to capture the world’s attention and viscerally communicate human rights abuses.

WITNESS was founded the following year, in 1992, with a $1 million seed grant from the Reebok Human Rights Foundation and a partnership with the Lawyers Committee for Human Rights (now Human Rights First).

In 1999, WITNESS.org was utilizing streaming video as a part of its mission. It was a finalist for RealNetworks, Inc. Streamers Progressive Award as the year's best non-profit streaming media organization, losing out to Assistive Media.

In 2001, WITNESS became an independent nonprofit organization. In 2004, WITNESS started hosting a benefit dinner and concert called "Focus for Change."

In 2009, WITNESS initiated a focused use of social media as a part of its outreach for video for change. Since 2009, the organization began reporting social media statistics in the organization's performance reports. In 2012, WITNESS launched a joint project with Storyful and YouTube called the Human Rights Channel.

WITNESS has a staff of 30 and a $3.9 million budget.

== Campaigns ==
WITNESS has worked with over 300 organizations in over eighty countries since its founding. On February 18, 2015, the New York Times article, “The Media Doesn’t Care What Happens Here”, featured WITNESS’ work in Brazil and their video as evidence initiative with media activists operating in the country's favelas. Other programs include:

=== Training ===
WITNESS has developed training kits to help activists and videographers use video to support their advocacy campaigns. WITNESS gives access to their educational materials through their online library.

=== Cameras Everywhere ===
WITNESS partnered with the Guardian Project to launch the Cameras Everywhere with the goal of ensuring that human rights videos are created and distributed safely, effectively, and ethically. The focus of the Cameras Everywhere project is SecureSmartCam, a program that runs on smartphones to ensure the safety and authenticity of human rights videos. The safety of activists is the goal of the ObscureCam, which detects and blurs faces in photos and videos. Video support is under development as of March 2012. The authenticity of the video is the goal of InformaCam, which automatically records and encrypts information such as the GPS coordinates of the camera during filming and nearby wireless signals.

=== Gender-based violence ===
WITNESS provides support to activists and survivors of gender-based violence.

Feminicide in Mexico: In March 2009, Mexico's Attorney General and Minister of Interior committed to personally follow up on the cases of Neyra Cervantes, who was brutally murdered in 2003, and her cousin, David Meza, who spent three years in jail after being tortured into confessing to her murder. This agreement was the outcome of a meeting between Peter Gabriel, actor Diego Luna, Jaguares’ Saúl Hernández, Patricia Cervantes (Neyra’s mother) and Mexico’s President Calderón, asking him to end feminicide in Ciudad Juárez and Chihuahua, Mexico. Since the meeting, WITNESS partner Comisión Mexicana has met twice with government officials, who are reviewing the status of the proceedings of Neyra/David’s cases and studying the list of priority policies related to ending feminicide. Neyra’s story is the focus of the film, Dual Injustice, co-produced by WITNESS and Comisión Mexicana de Defensa y Promoción de los Derechos Humano (CMDPDH). The video was part of a successful international WITNESS campaign in 2006 calling for Miguel David Meza’s release and a further investigation into Neyra’s case.

Discrimination against Akhdam Women in Yemen: In 2009, WITNESS partnered with the Sisters Arab Forum (SAF) to produce a documentary called “Breaking the Silence,” about the plight of Akhdam women in Yemen. The video is currently banned in Yemen, and both WITNESS and SAF are working to repeal the ban.

=== Middle East and North Africa transitions ===
WITNESS launched a program in 2011 to support the transition to democracy in the Middle East and North Africa following the Arab Spring. This program includes: a partnership with the Egyptian Democratic Academy (EDA); hosting a human rights convention in the region to identify immediate needs; identifying, disseminating and translating innovative tools and tactics; and developing new apps for human rights in the region.

=== Child Soldiers ===
2007: WITNESS teamed with AJEDI-Ka/PES to create a video to oppose the recruitment of child soldiers in the Democratic Republic of the Congo (DRC). The partnership sought to bring to justice those responsible for the crimes that led to the 2007 war crimes charges by the International Criminal Court (ICC) against Congolese warlord Thomas Lubanga Dyilo. The resulting film, A Duty to Protect, was screened at a high-level panel discussion at U.N. Headquarters in November 2007, following the arrest by the ICC of a second DRC warlord for the use of child soldiers. WITNESS partnered with Amnesty International to develop a companion curriculum for the film.

=== Human trafficking ===
Modern-Day Slavery in Brazil: In 2007, Bound by Promises, a film about modern-day slavery in rural Brazil, was screened before the Brazilian Congress’ Human Rights Commission.

Human Sex Trafficking in the United States: In 2012, WITNESS co-produced a 21-minute advocacy video called What I Have Been Through Is Not Who I Am, with ECPAT-USA. The short documentary tells the story of Katrina, a child who was trafficked for sex in the United States.

=== Elder abuse ===
In 2009, WITNESS and the National Council on Aging (NCOA) produced An Age for Justice: Confronting Elder Abuse in America, a film about the financial, emotional and physical abuse that up to an estimated five million older Americans face every year.

=== Climate change ===
WITNESS joined the "iMatter Trust Campaign" with Our Children's Trust, the iMatter Campaign and students from Montana State University’s MFA in Science and Natural History Filmmaking to co-produce a series of videos highlighting how climate change and government inaction are affecting the everyday lives of our youth.

=== The Hub: Human Rights Media Center ===
WITNESS launched the Hub in 2007 as a single point for users to upload human rights videos that might not be uploadable elsewhere. Because those needs have been fulfilled by other sources, the Hub has now become an archive for the content that had previously been uploaded.

== Outside ratings ==
- Charity Navigator awarded WITNESS 3 out of 4 stars overall, and 4 out of 4 stars on “Accountability and Transparency”.
- The Global Journal rated WITNESS No. 83 of the top 100 non-governmental organizations in 2012.
- The Global Journal rated WITNESS No. 52 of the top 100 non-governmental organizations in 2013.

== See also ==
- Video evidence
- Police accountability
