= Tkabber =

Instant messaging client using Tk

- Screenshot Tkabber 0.10.0
- Developer: The Tkabber Team
- Release: 2002
- Stable release: 1.1.2 / May 10, 2015; 11 years ago
- Preview release: Fossil
- Written in: Tcl/Tk
- Operating system: Cross-platform
- Type: Instant messaging client
- License: GNU GPL
- Website: tkabber.jabber.ru
- Repository: chiselapp.com/user/sgolovan/repository/tkabber

Tkabber is a GPL instant messaging client for the XMPP protocol which uses the Tk toolkit for the GUI. It runs on anything to which Tcl/Tk is ported: almost any X-based system (namely, any Linux and *BSD, Solaris, etc.), Microsoft Windows, and Mac OS X.

== History ==
Tkabber was started by Alexey Shchepin (also the author of ejabberd XMPP server) in 2002. Several people contributed into it, notably Marshal T. Rose, Michail Litvak and Sergei Golovan, who is the current maintainer of the project.

In October 2004, Alexey Shchepin won an Honorable Mention for Tkabber in the ActiveState Programmer Network's Coolest Tk Screenshot Contest. Coincidentally, another Jabber/XMPP client was a Grand Prize Winner: Mats Bengtsson for Coccinella.

The word "Tkabber" is built of two words: "Tk" and "Jabber" which alludes to the GUI toolkit used and the family of network protocols implemented. No one really knows how it is pronounced. Russian speakers (including the Tkabber's author, who invented this name) pronounce it as [t'kabber].

== Availability ==
Tkabber is primarily distributed in the form of two tarballs containing the code of its "core" and standard external plugins. Since Tkabber is written in an interpreted language, it does not require any "building" for a target platform. Nevertheless, Tkabber is packaged by most of known Linux distros and FreeBSD. Also special "all-in-one" packages for Microsoft Windows are provided (they don't require separate installation of the Tcl/Tk runtime) in the forms of installer and starpack. Starpack for Linux x86 is also provided.

== Mission statement ==
The goal of the Tkabber project is to create a cross-platform XMPP client which is feature-rich and is easy to hack. Tkabber is written in Tcl allowing it can be customized without knowledge of a low-level language such as C++ and its build system.

== See also ==
- Comparison of instant messaging clients
