= Instant Messaging and Presence Protocol =

IETF working group created in 1999

Instant Messaging and Presence Protocol (IMPP) was an IETF working group created for the purpose of developing an architecture for simple instant messaging and presence awareness/notification. It was created on 25 February 1999 and concluded on 8 September 2004.

== Documents ==
Documents
Month	RFC	Title	Status
February 2000	RFC 2778	A Model for Presence and Instant Messaging	Informational
February 2000	RFC 2779	Instant Messaging / Presence Protocol Requirements	Informational
July 2002	RFC 3339	Date and Time on the Internet: Timestamps	Proposed Standard
August 2004	RFC 3859	Common Profile for Presence (CPP)	Proposed Standard
August 2004	RFC 3860	Common Profile for Instant Messaging (CPIM)	Proposed Standard
August 2004	RFC 3861	Address Resolution for Instant Messaging and Presence	Proposed Standard
August 2004	RFC 3862	Common Presence and Instant Messaging (CPIM): Message Format	Proposed Standard
August 2004	RFC 3863	Presence Information Data Format (PIDF)	Proposed Standard

== See also ==
- Presence and Instant Messaging (PRIM)
- SIP for Instant Messaging and Presence Leveraging Extensions (SIMPLE)
- Extensible Messaging and Presence Protocol (XMPP) AKA Jabber
