= Orbot =

Free software project to provide anonymity on the Internet from an Android smartphone

- Developer: Guardian Project
- Release: 1 October 2008
- Stable release: Android: 17.7.0 RC 3 (19 November 2025) iOS: 1.8.5 (24 November 2025)
- Written in: Java
- Operating system: Android, iOS, macOS
- Size: Varies with device
- License: 3-clause BSD license
- Website: orbot.app
- Repository: github.com/guardianproject/orbot

Orbot is a free proxy app that provides anonymity on the Internet for users of the Android and iOS operating systems. It allows traffic from apps such as web browsers, email clients, map programs, and others to be routed via the Tor network.

This tool is used to keep the communications of users anonymous and hidden from governments and third parties that might be monitoring their internet traffic.

== Reception ==
In 2014 Orbot was discussed in detail in an article on "reporting securely from an Android device". In January 2016, Lisa Vaas of NakedSecurity by Sophos described how to use Tor, including with Orbot on Android, to connect to Facebook.

In July 2021, Tech Radar named Orbot one of 8 "Best privacy apps for Android in 2021" but warned of slower speeds. In July 2021 Android Authority discussed Tor Browser and Orbot in brief reviews of "15 best Android browsers".

In November 2021, John Leyden of The Daily Swig described collaboration between the Tor Project and the Guardian Project to develop Orbot for censorship circumvention for any application on a device, but warned Orbot does not remove identifying information from app traffic. In July 2022, Laiba Mohsin of PhoneWorld.com described Orbot as a simple way to access the Dark Web on mobile.

In October 2022, Damir Mujezinovic of MakeUseOf described Orbot as a "flagship" product for both iOS and Android to use the Tor network, and said it "will not make you completely anonymous, but it can certainly help bypass certain geographical restrictions," In November 2022, Mujezinovic wrote a detailed guide to using Orbot on iOS or Android.
