= XMPP Standards Foundation =

Organization overseeing the XMPP network protocol

Logo

XMPP Standards Foundation (XSF) is a non-profit organization that develops and maintains open standards for the XMPP, a decentralized real-time communication protocol standardized through the IETF. The foundation manages the XMPP Extension Protocol (XEP) process, which defines optional extensions to the protocol. It was founded in 2001 as the Jabber Software Foundation and renamed the XMPP Standards Foundation in 2007.

== History ==
The XSF was originally called the Jabber Software Foundation (JSF). The Jabber Software Foundation was originally established to provide an independent, non-profit, legal entity to support the development community around Jabber technologies (and later XMPP). Originally its main focus was on developing JOSL, the Jabber Open Source License (since deprecated), and an open standards process for documenting the protocols used in the Jabber/XMPP developer community. Its founders included Michael Bauer and Peter Saint-Andre.

Timeline

- 1999–2001: Jeremie Miller announces Jabber, an open instant messaging technology. Open-source servers, clients, and libraries are developed. In 2001, the JSF is formally established to coordinate projects and protocol development.
- 2002–2004: JSF contributes Jabber protocols to the IETF, forming the XMPP Working Group. Core XMPP protocols are standardized in RFC 3920 and RFC 3921.
- 2005–2007: JSF participates in Google Summer of Code, and large-scale XMPP services like Google Talk are deployed. The JSF is renamed XMPP Standards Foundation (XSF) in 2007.
- 2006–present: XSF organizes regular XMPP Summits, continues Google Summer of Code participation, and oversees the development of XMPP Extension Protocols (XEPs). Notable achievements include updates to XMPP core RFCs (RFC 6120, RFC 6121, RFC 7395, RFC 7590, RFC 7622) and expansion into areas like IoT.

== Process ==
Members of the XSF vote on acceptance of new members, a technical Council, and a Board of Directors. However, membership is not required to publish, view, or comment on the standards that it promulgates. The unit of work at the XSF is the XMPP Extension Protocol (XEP); XEP-0001 specifies the process for XEPs to be accepted by the community. Most of the work of the XSF takes place on the XMPP Extension Discussion List, the jdev and the xsf chat room.

=== Board of directors ===
The Board of Directors of the XMPP Standards Foundation oversees the business affairs of the organization. As elected by the XSF membership. As of 2026, the Board of Directors consists of the following individuals:

- Guus der Kinderen
- Ralph Meijer
- Mickaël Rémond
- Florian Schmaus
- Arne-Bruen Vogelsang

=== Council ===
The XMPP Council is the technical steering group that approves XMPP Extension Protocols, as governed by the XSF Bylaws and XEP-0001. The Council is elected by the members of the XMPP Standards Foundation each year in September. As of 2026, the XMPP Council is composed of the following members:

- Dan Caseley
- Daniel Gultsch
- Marvin Wissfeld
- Stephen Paul Weber
- Jérôme Poisson

=== Members ===
There are currently 56 elected members of the XSF.

==== Emeritus Members ====
The following individuals are emeritus members of the XMPP Standards Foundation:

- Peter Millard (deceased)
- Dave Smith
- Jeremie Miller
- Julian Missig
- Ryan Eatmon
- Thomas Muldowney

== Standards and specifications ==
=== Core XMPP specifications ===
The core XMPP protocol is standardized through the Internet Engineering Task Force, primarily in RFC 6120, RFC 6121, and RFC 6122, with subsequent updates and clarifications published over time.

=== XMPP Extension Protocols ===
In addition to the core protocol, the XSF maintains the XMPP Extension Protocol (XEP) series, which defines optional extensions that add functionality while preserving interoperability between implementations.

The XEP process is open and community-driven, allowing anyone to propose an extension. XEPs progress through defined maturity levels such as Experimental, Draft, Final, or Deprecated under the oversight of the XMPP Council, as specified in XEP-0001.

Some XEPs have become the basis for their own widely implemented protocols, including Jingle, used for multimedia session signalling, and Bidirectional-streams Over Synchronous HTTP (BOSH).

== Activities ==
=== Summits and events ===
The XSF organizes regular XMPP Summits, typically held annually or biannually, where developers and community members meet to discuss protocol development and future directions. In winter the summit has traditionally been held alongside the FOSDEM event in Brussels, Belgium. The first XMPP Summit took place on 24–25 July 2006 in Portland, United States.

=== Publications and outreach ===
The foundation publishes regular XMPP Newsletters summarizing technical developments, community projects, and ecosystem news, and participates in outreach related to open standards and decentralized communication.
