= Adium =

Instant messaging client

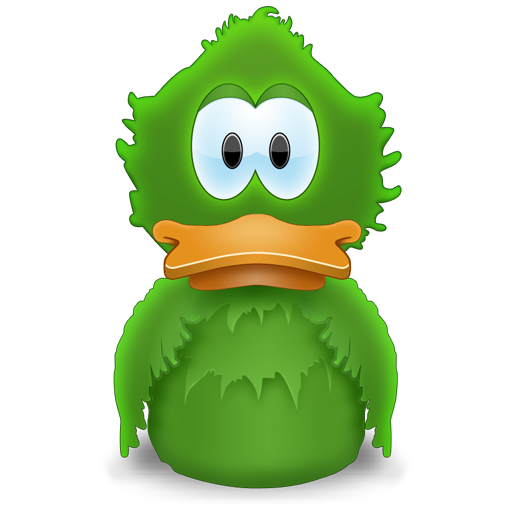

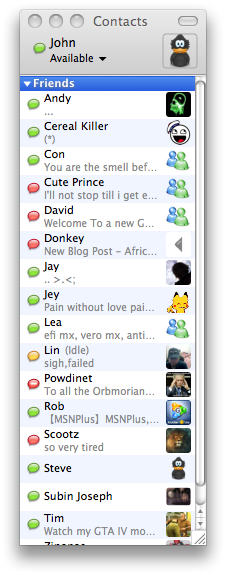
- Screenshot Screenshot of Adium in 2009
- Developer: Adium team
- Release: September 28, 2001 (25 years ago)
- Stable release: 1.5.10.4 (April 27, 2017; 9 years ago) [±]
- Preview release: 1.5.11hgr5899 (January 15, 2015; 11 years ago) [±]
- Written in: Objective-C, Cocoa API
- Operating system: macOS
- Available in: multilingual
- Type: Instant messaging client
- License: GNU General Public License
- Website: www.adium.im
- Repository: github.com/adium/adium

Adium is a free and open-source instant messaging client for macOS that supports multiple IM networks, including XMPP (Jabber), IRC and more. In the past, it has also supported AIM, ICQ, Windows Live Messenger and Yahoo! Messenger. Adium is written using macOS's Cocoa API, and it is released under the GNU GPL-2.0-or-later and many other licenses for components that are distributed with Adium.

== History ==
Adium was created by college student Adam Iser, and the first version, "Adium 1.0", was released in September 2001 and supported only AIM. Since then, the version numbers of Adium have followed a somewhat unusual pattern. There were several upgrades to Adium 1.0, ending with Adium 1.6.2c.

At this point, the Adium team began a complete rewrite of the Adium code, expanding it into a multiprotocol messaging program. Pidgin's (formerly "Gaim") libpurple (then called "libgaim") library was implemented to add support for IM protocols other than AIM – since then the Adium team has mostly been working on the GUI. The Adium team originally intended to release these changes as "Adium 2.0". However, Adium was eventually renamed to "Adium X" and released at version 0.50, being considered "halfway to a 1.0 product". Adium X 0.88 was the first version compiled as a universal binary, allowing it to run natively on Intel-based Macs.

In 2005, Adium received a "Special Mention" at the Apple Design Awards.

After version Adium X 0.89.1, however, the team finally decided to change the name back to "Adium", and, as such, "Adium 1.0" was released on February 2, 2007.

Apple Inc. used Adium X 0.89.1's build time in Xcode 2.3 as a benchmark for comparing the performance of the Mac Pro and Power Mac G5 Quad, and Adium 1.2's build time in Xcode 3.0 as a benchmark for comparing the performance of the eight-core Mac Pro and Power Mac G5 Quad.

On November 4, 2014, Adium scored 6 out of 7 points on the Electronic Frontier Foundation's secure messaging scorecard. It lost a point because there has not been a recent independent code audit.

From March 2019, Adium is no longer able to support the ICQ plugin.

== Protocols ==
Adium supports a wide range of instant messaging networks through the libraries libezv (for Bonjour), STTwitterEngine (for Twitter), and libpurple (for all other protocols).

Adium supports the following protocols:

- XMPP (including Google Talk, Facebook Chat, and LiveJournal services)
- Twitter
- Bonjour
- Internet Relay Chat
- Novell GroupWise
- IBM Sametime
- Gadu-Gadu
- Skype with a plugin
- Skype for Business Server (previously Microsoft Lync Server, Microsoft Office Communications Server) with a plugin
- Telegram with a plugin
- Tencent QQ with a plugin
- Steam Chat with the "Steam IM" plugin
- NateOn with a plugin

== Plugins and customization ==
Adium makes use of a plug-in architecture; many of the program's essential features are actually provided by plugins bundled inside the application package. These plugins include functionality such as file transfer, support for the Growl notifications system, Sparkle for program updates, and support for encrypted messaging with the Off-the-Record Messaging library.

Adium is also highly customizable through the use of resources its developers call "Xtras". The program can be customized by the use of hundreds of third-party Xtras that alter the appearance of emoticons, dock icons, contact list styles, and message styles. Adium can also be enhanced through the use of different sound sets. AppleScripts can also be utilized to automatically alter behavior in responses to certain triggers.

== Icon ==
The icon of Adium is a green duck named Adiumy. It is also the mascot of the software.

== History of releases ==
Adium
Software version	Minimum OS	Release date
0.89.1	10.2	April 10, 2006
1.0.6	10.3.9	July 9, 2007
1.3.10	10.4	January 12, 2010
1.4.5	10.5.8	March 20, 2012
1.5.10	10.6.8	May 19, 2014
1.5.10.4	10.7.5	April 27, 2017
Versions 0.88 to 1.4.5 are universal binaries.

== See also ==
- Comparison of cross-platform instant messaging clients
- Comparison of instant messaging protocols
- List of computing mascots
