= Conversations (software) =

Free software instant messaging client for the XMPP protocol

- Logo

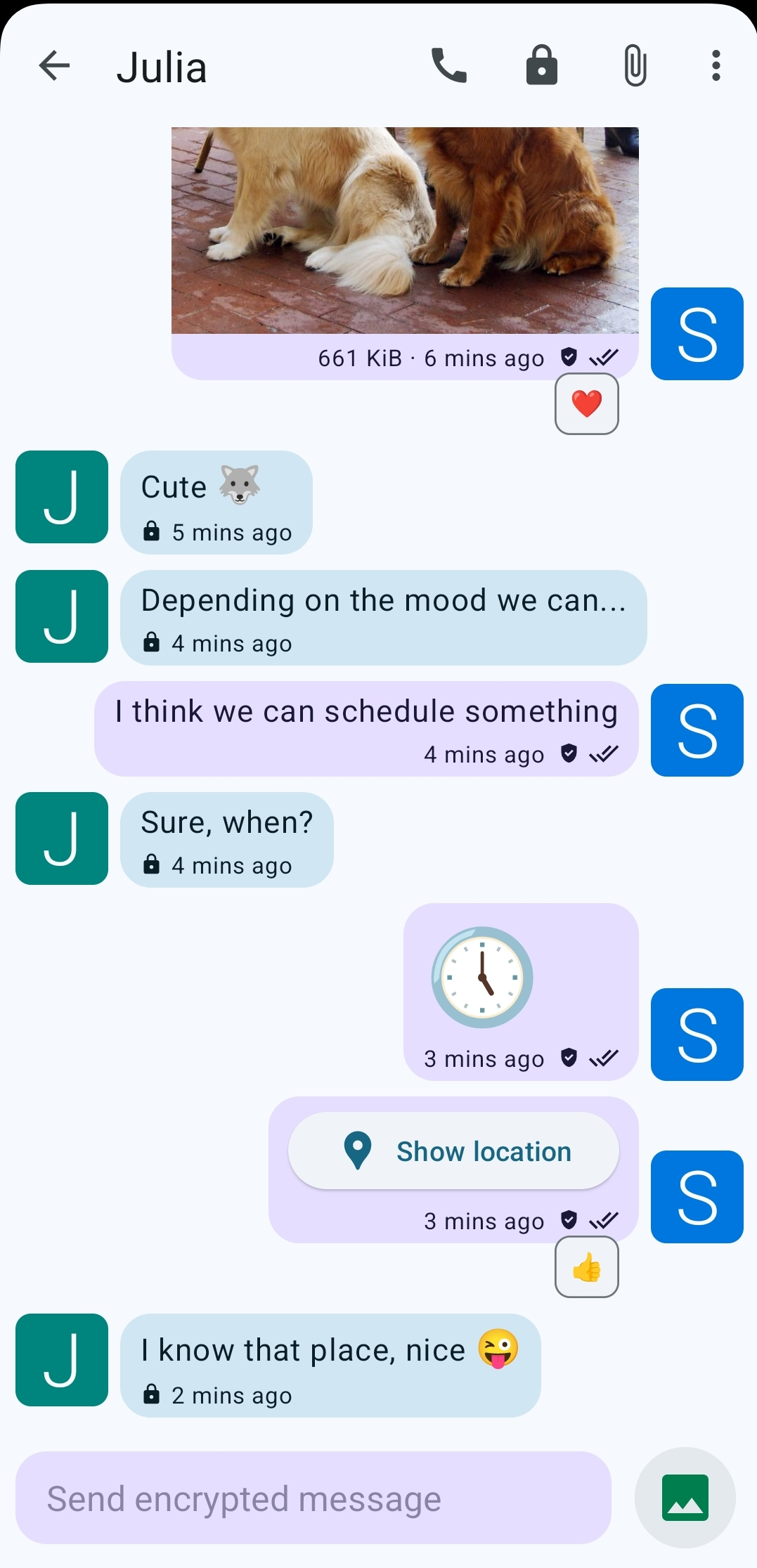
- Screenshot
- Original author: Daniel Gultsch
- Developer: Daniel Gultsch
- Release: March 24, 2014; 12 years ago
- Stable release: 2.20.2 / 9 September 2026
- Preview release: 2.19.16-beta / 29 April 2026
- Written in: Java
- Operating system: Android ≥ 5.0
- Available in: German
- Type: Instant Messenger
- License: GPL-3.0-only
- Website: conversations.im
- Repository: codeberg.org/iNPUTmice/Conversations

Conversations is a free and open source instant messaging client application software for Android. It is largely based on recognized open standards such as the Extensible Messaging and Presence Protocol (XMPP). It was written by Daniel Gultsch in 2014.

The development focus is on secure communication and implementation of XMPP extensions that are important for mobile use. The trade press praised the decentralized and open nature of the transmission network and simple, intuitive usability with user guidance familiar from other applications. It enjoys recognition as a serious attempt to raise the mass suitability of XMPP-based messaging to a competitive level.

The source code of the software is maintained at Codeberg, and is subject to the terms of the GPL-3.0-only license. The application can be installed for free (or with donations) using F-Droid, or for a fee in the Google Play store. Google recorded over 100,000 installations as of November 2020.

== Features ==
Conversations includes optional end-to-end encryption (OpenPGP or OMEMO), and in-transit encryption (Transport Layer Security). The latter must be configured by the server computers involved in the messaging.

Conversations allows users to have multiple client devices (endpoints) logged into an account simultaneously (through XMPP), and also delivers messages to multiple client devices (synchronization) using the protocol extension "Message Carbons" ("carbon copies", XEP-0280).

Files, also encrypted, can be sent between users. Transmitted images are displayed in the conversation view as inline image messages.

As an XMPP client, Conversations can exchange messages with other, different XMPP client software, in principle, and is also not tied to a particular vendor's server infrastructure. The following features are also included:

- Multi-User (Group) chat (MUC)
- Optional address book integration
- Support for multiple user accounts or addresses

=== Implemented XMPP extension protocols ===
Conversations handles many XMPP extension protocols (XEP, official extensions of XMPP).

== History ==
In the wake of the Edward Snowden disclosures in June 2013, and Facebook's buyout of WhatsApp in February 2014, "secure" messengers for mobile devices were gaining popularity. Initial Conversations source code was contributed to the public repository on January 24, 2014, and the first official version, 0.1, was released on March 24, 2014. Conversations soon received positive feedback.

Conversations was added to Google Play later in spring 2014, and to the alternative Android software repository F-Droid with version 0.1.3 on April 6, 2014.

Since version 0.2, released on May 12, image messages (file transfers, in plain text or OpenPGP-encrypted) are supported, from version 0.4 (June 30) also OTR-encrypted. Version 1.0 followed on February 1, 2015.

Developer Andreas Straub participated in the Google Summer of Code for Conversations in 2015. This produced drafts of a new end-to-end encryption standard (OMEMO), which were submitted to the XMPP Standards Foundation (XSF) for standardization.

As of version 2.0.0, the ability to use Off-the-Record Messaging (OTR) for encryption has been removed. Furthermore, OMEMO is now enabled by default in individual chats and private group chats. Version 2.2.0 implemented previously optional extensions to record voice messages and share location in Conversations in May 2018.

Version 2.3.0 introduced support for TLS 1.3 in September 2018.

Version 2.8 introduced encrypted audio and video calls in April 2020.

== Quicksy ==
The offshoot instant messenger, Quicksy, was also created by Daniel Gultsch. Users of this client open an account at the host quicksy.im, where the username consists of the phone number. This enables a contact search for other users of the app using the contacts list or phone book. This is intended to lower the barrier to entry into the XMPP (Jabber) network. Quicksy users can also communicate with XMPP users on other hosts.

In 2024, Monal, a XMPP client for iOS and macOS, was adapted to use mobile-based identification under the Quicksy name to make it available for iOS, with the agreement of Quicksy's author.

== Reception ==
The Free Software Foundation includes Conversations in their software directory.

In an analysis of Conversations and Xabber apps, researchers found that "forensic artefacts" could be found on an Android device including local user, contacts and body of messages sent or received using the app, as plaintext in the main database maintained by the app.

In 2017, Raul Radonz of XDA Developers wrote a detailed review of Conversations, including an interview of developer Daniel Gultsch. The review highlighted choices of encryption and inclusion of "Forward Secrecy".

In a 2020 review, Decentralize Today said "XMPP and Conversations has the potential to be an excellent and super secure messenger if you host it yourself," but "problems could emerge when you use XMPP with contacts who are on different servers."

Anticapitalist webhost company, Autistici, wrote detailed setup instructions for Conversations for their XMPP service.

== Notable usage ==
In 2018, the German Federal Police switched from WhatsApp to Moka, a fork of Conversations, for internal communications.

== See also ==
- Comparison of instant messaging clients
- Comparison of instant messaging protocols
- Secure communication
- SIMPLE
