= Pidgin (software) =

Open-source multi-platform instant messaging client

- Logo of Pidgin IM

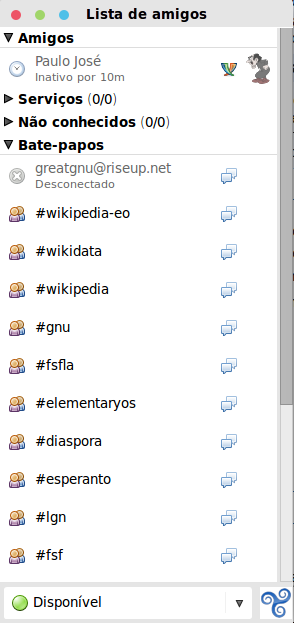
- Pidgin's buddy list window in Trisquel
- Release: December 31, 1998; 27 years ago (as Gaim)
- Stable release: 2.14.14 / 23 January 2025
- Preview release: 3.0.0 Experimental 5 (31 December 2025) [±]
- Written in: C (C#, Perl, Python, Tcl are used for plugins)
- Platform: Linux macOS (unofficial); Microsoft Windows; Solaris (unofficial); FreeBSD; NetBSD (unofficial); OpenBSD (unofficial)
- Available in: Multiple languages
- Type: Instant messaging client
- License: GPL-3.0-or-later
- Website: pidgin.im
- Repository: keep.imfreedom.org/pidgin/pidgin/

Pidgin (formerly named Gaim) is a free and open-source multi-platform instant messaging client, based on a library named libpurple that has support for many instant messaging protocols, allowing the user to simultaneously log in to various services from a single application, with a single interface for both popular and obsolete protocols (from AIM to Discord).

In 2007, the number of Pidgin users was estimated to be over three million.

Pidgin is used by some users for its Off-the-Record Messaging (OTR) plugin, which offers end-to-end encryption.

== History ==
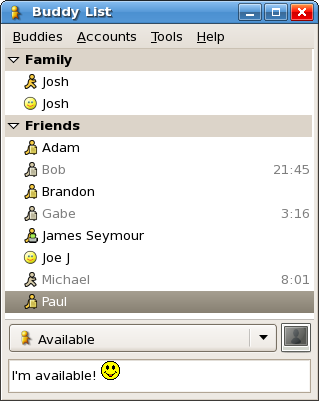
Gaim 2.0.0 beta 6 running under GNOME 2.16.0

The program was originally written by Mark Spencer, an Auburn University sophomore, as an emulation of AOL's IM program AOL Instant Messenger on Linux using the GTK+ toolkit. The earliest archived release was on December 31, 1998. It was named GAIM (GTK+ AOL Instant Messenger) accordingly. The emulation was not based on reverse engineering, but instead relied on information about the protocol that AOL had published on the web. Development was assisted by some of AOL's technical staff. Support for other IM protocols was added soon thereafter.

In response to pressure from AOL, the program was renamed to the acronymous-but-lowercase gaim. As AOL Instant Messenger gained popularity, AOL trademarked its acronym, "AIM", leading to a lengthy legal struggle with the creators of GAIM, who kept the matter largely secret.

On April 6, 2007, the project development team announced the results of their settlement with AOL, which included a series of name changes: Gaim became Pidgin, libgaim became libpurple, and gaim-text (the command-line interface version) became Finch. The name Pidgin was chosen in reference to the term "pidgin", which describes communication between people who do not share a common language. The name "purple" refers to "prpl", the internal libgaim name for an IM protocol plugin.

Due to the legal issues, version 2.0 of the software was frozen in beta stages. Following the settlement, it was announced that the first official release of Pidgin 2.0.0 was hoped to occur during the two weeks from April 8, 2007. However, Pidgin 2.0 was not released as scheduled; Pidgin developers announced on April 22, 2007, that the delay was due to the preferences directory ".gaim".

Pidgin 2.0.0 was released on May 3, 2007. Other visual changes were made to the interface in this version, including updated icons.

On 6 July 2015, Pidgin scored seven out of seven points on the Electronic Frontier Foundation's secure messaging scorecard. They have received points for having communications encrypted in transit, having communications encrypted with keys the providers don't have access to (end-to-end encryption), making it possible for users to independently verify their correspondent's identities, having past communications secure if the keys are stolen (forward secrecy), having their code open to independent review (open source), having their security designs well-documented, and having recent independent security audits.

Pidgin 3.0.0 Experimental 1, a preview release of Pidgin 3 versioned as 2.90, was announced and subsequently released on December 31, 2024 after many years of development. It was shipped with IRC support, with more protocols being expected to be added in future versions. In April 2025, version 2.91, a second preview release of Pidgin 3, was released.

== Features ==
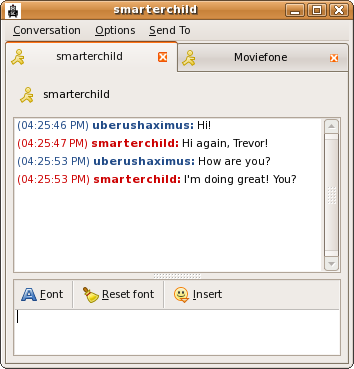
Pidgin running on Ubuntu

Pidgin provides a graphical front-end for libpurple using GTK+. Libpurple supports many instant-messaging protocols.

Pidgin supports multiple operating systems, including Windows and many Unix-like systems such as Linux, the BSDs, and AmigaOS. It is included by default in the operating systems Tails, Trisquel and Xubuntu.

=== Pluggability ===
The program is designed to be extended with plugins. Plugins are often written by third-party developers. They can be used to add support for protocols, which is useful for those such as Skype or Discord which have licensing issues (however, the users' data and interactions are still subject to their policies and eavesdropping). They can also add other significant features. For example, the "Off-the-Record Messaging" (OTR) plugin provides end-to-end encryption.

The TLS encryption system is pluggable, allowing different TLS libraries to be easily substituted. GnuTLS is the default, and NSS is also supported. Some operating systems' ports, such as OpenBSD's, choose to use OpenSSL or LibreSSL by default instead.

=== Contacts ===
Contacts with multiple protocols can be grouped into one single contact instead of managing multiple protocols, and contacts can be given aliases or placed into groups.

To reach users as they log on or a status change occurs (such as moving from "Away" to "Available"), Pidgin supports on-action automated scripts called Buddy Pounces to automatically reach the user in customizable ways.

=== File transfer ===
Pidgin supports file transfers for many protocols. Direct, peer-to-peer file transfers are supported over protocols such as XMPP.

=== Voice and video chat ===
As of version 2.6 (released on August 18, 2009), Pidgin supports voice/video calls using Farstream. As of July 2015, calls can only be initiated through the XMPP protocol.

=== Miscellaneous ===
Further features include support for themes, emoticons, spell checking, and notification area integration.

=== Supported protocols ===
The following protocols are supported by Pidgin 2.14.14 without any extensions or plugins:

- Gadu-Gadu
- IRC
- Novell GroupWise (to be discontinued in 3.0)
- SIMPLE
- XMPP
- Zephyr (to be discontinued in 3.0)

Some XMPP servers provide transports, which allow users to access networks using non-XMPP protocols without having to install plugins or additional software. Pidgin's support for XMPP means that these transports can be used to communicate via otherwise unsupported protocols, including not only instant messaging protocols, but also protocols such as SMS or E-mail.

Additional protocols, supported by third-party plugins, include Discord, Telegram, Microsoft OCS/LCS (extended SIP/SIMPLE), Facebook Messenger, QQ, WhatsApp, and Signal.

=== Plugins ===
Various other features are supported using third-party plugins. Such features include:

- Discord text chat via the purple-discord plugin
- Facebook chat via purple-facebook
- Google Chat via purple-googlechat
- microblogs (GNU social, Twitter)
- Slack (software) via slack-libpurple
- Telegram (software) via tdlib-purple
- End-to-end encryption, through Off-the-Record Messaging (OTR)
- Adding mathematical formulas written in LaTeX to conversations
- Notifications (such as showing "toaster" popups or Snarl notifications, or lighting LEDs on laptops)
- Showing contacts what the user is listening to in various media players
- Watching videos directly into a conversation when receiving a video sharing website link (YouTube, Vimeo)

== Criticisms ==
- As observed by Wired in 2015, the libpurple codebase is "known for its bountiful security bugs". In 2011, security vulnerabilities were already discovered in popular OTR plugins using libpurple.
- As of version 2.4 and later, the ability to manually resize the text input box of conversations was removed. This led to a fork, Carrier (originally named Funpidgin).
- Passwords are stored in a plaintext file, readable by any person or program that can access the user's files. Version 3.0 of Pidgin (no announced release date) will support password storage in system keyrings such as KWallet and the GNOME Keyring for Linux, Keychain for macOS, and winCred API for Windows.
- Pidgin does not currently support pausing or reattempting file transfers.
- Pidgin does not allow disabling the group sorting on the contact list.

== Other notable software based on libpurple ==
- Adium and the discontinued Proteus (both for macOS)
- Meebo (web-based, no longer available)
- Telepathy Haze (a Tube for some of the protocols supported by the Telepathy framework)
- QuteCom (cross-platform, focused on VoIP and video. Discontinued)
- Instantbird (discontinued) (cross-platform, based on Mozilla's Gecko engine)

BitlBee and Minbif are IRCd-like gateways to multiple IM networks, and can be compiled with libpurple to increase functionality.

== See also ==
- Multiprotocol instant messaging application
- Comparison of instant messaging protocols
- Comparison of cross-platform instant messaging clients
- Comparison of Internet Relay Chat clients
- Online chat
- List of computing mascots
- Category:Computing mascots
