= XMPP =

Communications protocol for message-oriented middleware

- Communication protocol
- Purpose: Instant messaging, Federated messaging
- Developers: XMPP Standards Foundation; IETF XMPP WG
- Introduction: 1999; 27 years ago
- Based on: XML
- OSI layer: Application layer
- Ports: TCP 5222, 5269, 8010
- RFCs: RFC 6120 (Core), RFC 6121 (IM & Presence), RFC 7622 (Address Format), RFC 3922 (CPIM), RFC 3923 (Encryption)
- Website: xmpp.org

Extensible Messaging and Presence Protocol (abbreviation XMPP, originally named Jabber) is an open communication protocol designed for instant messaging (IM), presence information, and contact list maintenance. Based on XML (Extensible Markup Language), it enables the near-real-time exchange of structured data between two or more network entities. Designed to be extensible, the protocol offers a multitude of applications beyond traditional IM in the broader realm of message-oriented middleware, including signalling for VoIP, video, file transfer, gaming and other uses.

Unlike most commercial instant messaging protocols, XMPP is defined in an open standard in the application layer. The architecture of the XMPP network is similar to email; anyone can run their own XMPP server and there is no central master server. This federated open system approach allows users to interoperate with others on any server using a Jabber identifier (JID) user account, similar to an email address. XMPP implementations can be developed using any software license and many server, client, and library implementations are distributed as free and open-source software. Numerous freeware and commercial software implementations also exist.

Originally developed by the open-source community, the protocols were formalized as an approved instant messaging standard in 2004 and have been continuously developed with new extensions and features. Various XMPP client software are available on both desktop and mobile platforms and devices – by 2003 the protocol was used by over ten million people worldwide on the network, according to the XMPP Standards Foundation.

== Federated Instant Messaging ==
Although the protocol has other uses, the primary application is Federated Instant Messaging, to deliver a standard Instant Messaging and Presence Protocol, outlined below.

A client Alice ("alice@example.com") has a message for some other user, Beth ("beth@example.com"), and uses XMPP to convey this to the example.com server. If Beth is online, the server delivers the message instantly, otherwise it will be held for delivery later. If Beth is offline, this status is visible to Alice.

If the message is for a user on another server, Charles ("charles@example.net"), then the example.com server connects using XMPP to pass the message to the example.net server. The message is then similarly delivered or held, and Alice is informed of the status.

Following the initial message delivery, the end clients are in a "chat" and each party is subsequently informed of changes to the other's status.

=== Client-to-Server XMPP and Server-to-Server XMPP ===
The XMPP client communicates with the server over a TLS-encrypted TCP stream on port 5222. XMPP servers communicate with each other over a TLS-encrypted TCP stream on port 5269.

== Protocol characteristics ==
=== Decentralization ===
A simple XMPP network with the servers jabber.org and draugr.de. Green clients are online, yellow clients are writing each other and small green subclients are the resources of one user. The brown network is not connected to the internet. The server draugr.de is connected to other IM services (ICQ, AIM and other) via XMPP transports.

The XMPP network architecture is reminiscent of the Simple Mail Transfer Protocol (SMTP), a client–server model; clients do not talk directly to one another as it is decentralized – anyone can run a server. By design, there is no central authoritative server as there is with messaging services such as AIM, WLM, WhatsApp or Telegram. Some confusion often arises on this point as there is a public XMPP server being run at jabber.org, to which many users subscribe. However, anyone may run their own XMPP server on their own domain.

=== Addressing ===
A standard JID

Every user on the network has a unique XMPP address, called a Jabber ID (JID). The JID is structured like an email address with a username and a domain name (or IP address) for the server where that user resides, separated by an at sign (@) – for example, alice@example.com Here alice is the username and example.com the server with which the user is registered.

Since a user may wish to log in from multiple locations, they may specify a resource. A resource identifies a particular client belonging to the user (for example home, work, or mobile). This may be included in the JID by appending a slash followed by the name of the resource. For example, the full JID of a user's mobile account could be username@example.com/mobile.

Each resource may have specified a numerical value called priority. Messages simply sent to username@example.com will go to the client with highest priority, but those sent to username@example.com/mobile will go only to the mobile client. The highest priority is the one with largest numerical value.

JIDs without a username part are also valid, and may be used for system messages and control of special features on the server. A resource remains optional for these JIDs as well.

The means to route messages based on a logical endpoint identifier—the JID, instead of by an explicit IP address—presents opportunities to use XMPP as an overlay network implementation on top of different underlying networks.

=== XMPP via HTTP ===
The original and "native" transport protocol for XMPP is Transmission Control Protocol (TCP), using open-ended XML streams over long-lived TCP connections. As an alternative to the TCP transport, the XMPP community has also developed an HTTP transport for web clients as well as users behind restricted firewalls. In the original specification, XMPP could use HTTP in two ways: polling and binding. The polling method, now deprecated, essentially implies messages stored on a server-side database are being fetched (and posted) regularly by an XMPP client by way of HTTP 'GET' and 'POST' requests. The binding method, implemented using Bidirectional-streams Over Synchronous HTTP (BOSH), allows servers to push messages to clients as soon as they are sent. This push model of notification is more efficient than polling, where many of the polls return no new data. XMPP also supports using WebSockets to communicate to a server.

Because the client uses HTTP, most firewalls allow clients to fetch and post messages without any hindrances. Thus, in scenarios where the TCP port used by XMPP is blocked, a server can listen on the normal HTTP port and the traffic should pass without problems. Various websites let people sign into XMPP via a browser. Furthermore, there are open public servers that listen on standard http (port 80) and https (port 443) ports, and hence allow connections from behind most firewalls. However, the IANA-registered port for BOSH is actually 5280, not 80.

=== Extensibility ===
The XMPP Standards Foundation or XSF (formerly the Jabber Software Foundation) is active in developing open XMPP extensions, so called XEPs. However, extensions can also be defined by any individual, software project, or organization. To maintain interoperability, common extensions are managed by the XSF. XMPP applications beyond IM include: chat rooms, network management, content syndication, collaboration tools, file sharing, gaming, remote systems control and monitoring, geolocation, middleware and cloud computing, VoIP, and identity services.

Building on its capability to support discovery across local network domains, XMPP is well-suited for cloud computing where virtual machines, networks, and firewalls would otherwise present obstacles to alternative service discovery and presence-based solutions. Cloud computing and storage systems rely on various forms of communication over multiple levels, including not only messaging between systems to relay state but also the migration or distribution of larger objects, such as storage or virtual machines. Along with authentication and in-transit data protection, XMPP can be applied at a variety of levels and may prove ideal as an extensible middleware or Message-oriented middleware (MOM) protocol.

=== Current limitations ===
Since XML is text based, normal XMPP has a higher network overhead compared to purely binary solutions. This issue was being addressed by the experimental XEP-0322 Efficient XML Interchange (EXI) Format, where XML is serialized in an efficient binary manner, especially in schema-informed mode. This XEP is currently deferred.

In-band binary data transfer is limited. Binary data must be first base64 encoded before it can be transmitted in-band. Therefore, any significant amount of binary data (e.g., file transfers) is best transmitted out-of-band, using in-band messages to coordinate. In most cases this is dealt with by using an attachment to a message and the widely implemented XEP-0363 HTTP File Upload mechanism. Voice and Video chat can be done via the Jingle XMPP Extension Protocol, XEP-0166.

== Features ==
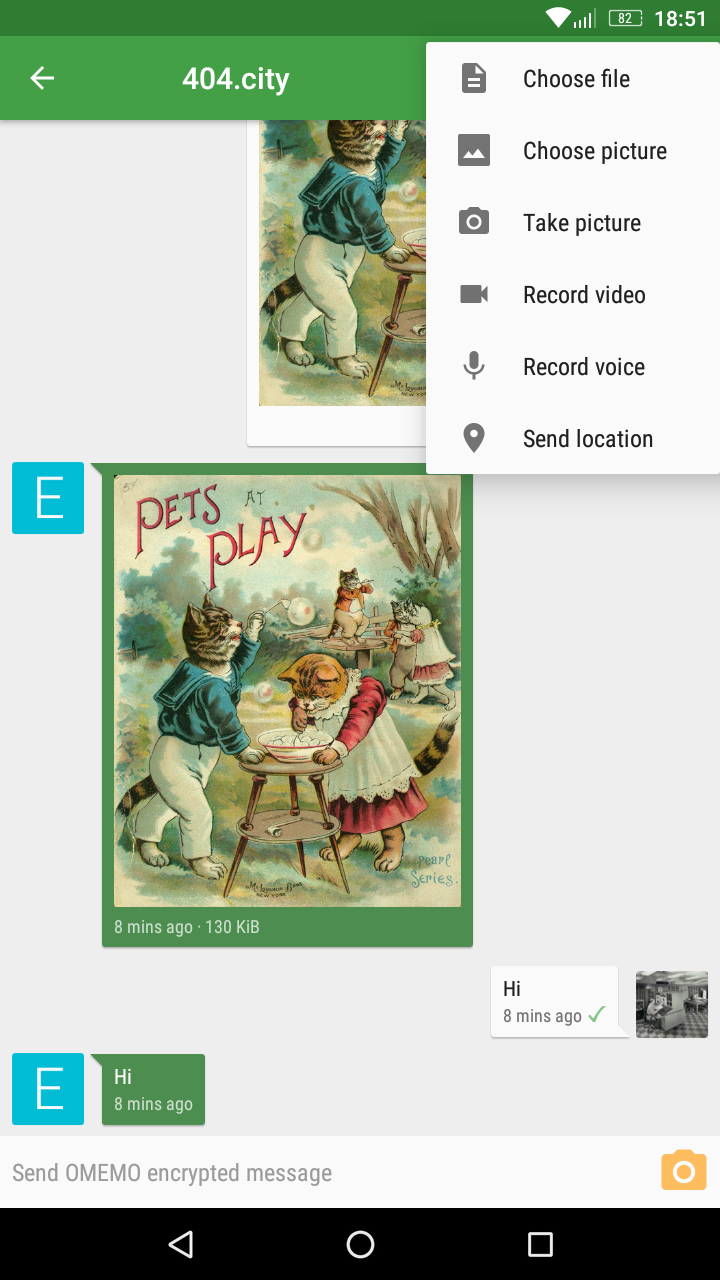
File transfer options in a chat in Conversations, an XMPP client for Android

=== Peer-to-peer sessions ===
Using the extension called Jingle, XMPP can provide an open means to support machine-to-machine or peer-to-peer communications across a diverse set of networks. This feature is mainly used for IP telephony (VoIP).

=== Multi-user chat ===
XMPP supports conferences with multiple users, using the specification Multi-User Chat (MUC) (XEP-0045). From the point of view of a normal user, it is comparable to Internet Relay Chat (IRC).

=== Security and encryption ===
XMPP servers can be isolated (e.g., on a company intranet), and secure authentication (SASL) and point-to-point encryption (TLS) have been built into the core XMPP specifications.

Off-the-Record Messaging (OTR) is an extension of XMPP enabling encryption of messages and data. It has since been replaced by a better extension, multi-end-to-multi-end encryption (OMEMO, XEP-0384) end-to-end encryption between users. This gives a higher level of security, by encrypting all data from the source client and decrypting again at the target client; the server operator cannot decrypt the data they are forwarding.

Messages can also be encrypted with OpenPGP, for example with the software Gajim.

=== Service discovery ===
While several service discovery protocols exist today (such as zeroconf or the Service Location Protocol), XMPP provides a solid base for the discovery of services residing locally or across a network, and the availability of these services (via presence information), as specified by XEP-0030 DISCO.

=== Connecting to other protocols ===
Alice sends a message through the XMPP net to the ICQ transport. The message is next routed to Bob via the ICQ network.

One of the original design goals of the early Jabber open-source community was enabling users to connect to multiple instant messaging systems (especially non-XMPP systems) through a single client application. This was done through entities called transports or gateways to other instant messaging protocols like ICQ, AIM or Yahoo Messenger, but also to protocols such as SMS, IRC or email. Unlike multi-protocol clients, XMPP provides this access at the server level by communicating via special gateway services running alongside an XMPP server. Any user can "register" with one of these gateways by providing the information needed to log on to that network, and can then communicate with users of that network as though they were XMPP users. Thus, such gateways function as client proxies (the gateway authenticates on the user's behalf on the non-XMPP service). As a result, any client that fully supports XMPP can access any network with a gateway without extra code in the client, and without the need for the client to have direct access to the Internet. However, the client proxy model may violate terms of service on the protocol used (although such terms of service are not legally enforceable in several countries) and also requires the user to send their IM username and password to the third-party site that operates the transport (which may raise privacy and security concerns).

Another type of gateway is a server-to-server gateway, which enables a non-XMPP server deployment to connect to native XMPP servers using the built in interdomain federation features of XMPP. Such server-to-server gateways are offered by several enterprise IM software products, including:

- HCL Sametime Premium
- Skype for Business Server (formerly named Microsoft Lync Server and Microsoft Office Communications Server – OCS)

== Software ==
XMPP is implemented by many clients, servers, and code libraries. These implementations are provided under a variety of software licenses.

=== Servers ===
Numerous XMPP server software exist, some well known ones include ejabberd and Prosody.

=== Modern clients ===
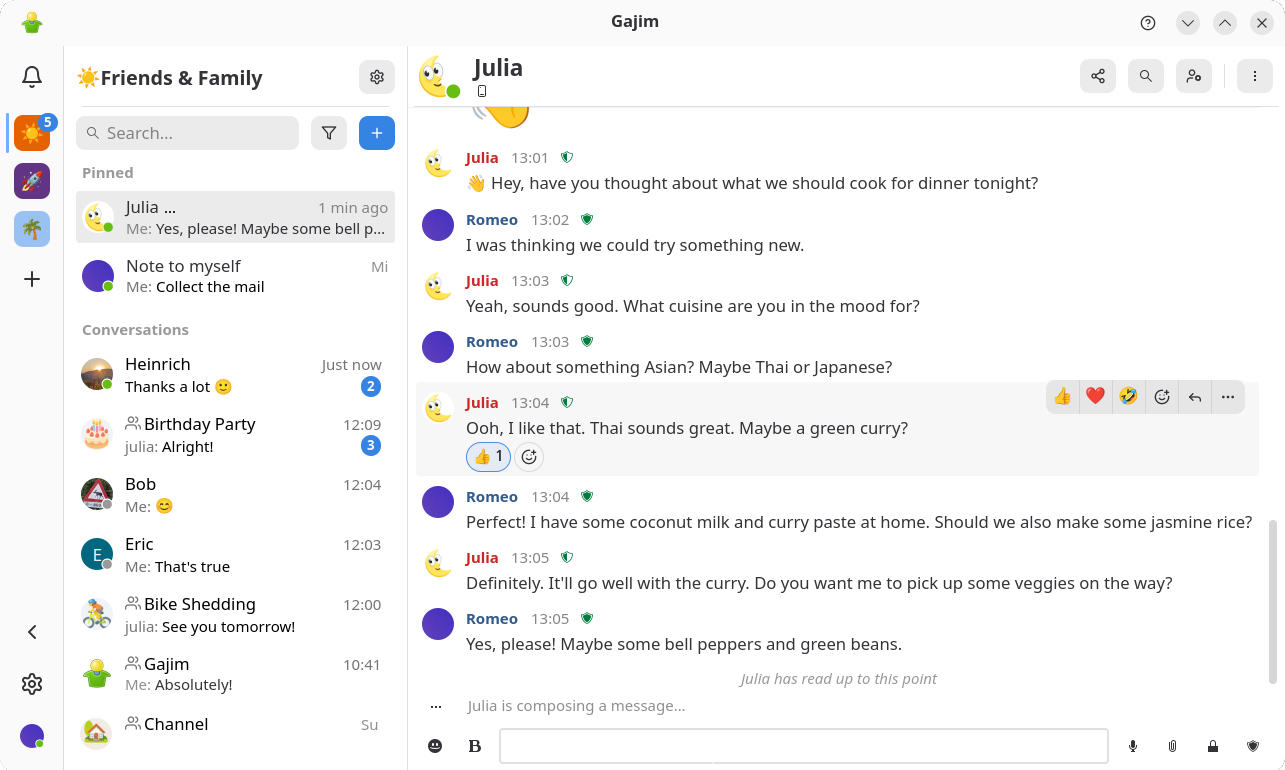
Main window of XMPP client Gajim

A large number of XMPP client software exist on various modern and legacy platforms, including both graphical and command line based clients. According to the XMPP website, some of the most popular software include Conversations, Cheogram, Monocles and Quicksy (Android), Dino (BSD, Windows, Unix, Linux), Converse.js (web browser, Linux, Windows, macOS), Gajim (Windows, Linux), Monal (macOS, iOS), and Swift.IM (macOS, Windows, Linux). Lately, Monal has been forked as a Quicksy release for iOS.

Other clients include: Bombus, ChatSecure, Coccinella, Miranda NG, Pidgin, Psi, Tkabber, Trillian, and Xabber.

== Deployment and distribution ==
There are thousands of XMPP servers worldwide, many public ones as well as private individuals or organizations running their own servers without commercial intent. Numerous websites show a list of public XMPP servers where users may register at (for example on the XMPP.net website).

Several large public IM services natively use or used XMPP, including LiveJournal's "LJ Talk", Nimbuzz, and HipChat. Various hosting services, such as DreamHost, enable hosting customers to choose XMPP services alongside more traditional web and email services. Specialized XMPP hosting services also exist in form of cloud so that domain owners need not directly run their own XMPP servers, including Cisco Webex Connect, Chrome.pl, Flosoft.biz, i-pobox.net, and hosted.im.

The majority of these services are Federated – so that users of one service can communicate with users of another service.

XMPP is also used in deployments of non-IM services, including smart grid systems such as demand response applications, message-oriented middleware, and as a replacement for SMS to provide text messaging on many smartphone clients.

=== Non-native deployments ===
Some of the largest messaging providers use, or have been using, various forms of XMPP based protocols in their backend systems without necessarily exposing this fact to their end users. One example is Google, which in August 2005 introduced Google Talk, a combination VoIP and IM system that uses XMPP for instant messaging and as a base for a voice and file transfer signaling protocol called Jingle. The initial launch did not include server-to-server communications; Google enabled that feature on January 17, 2006. Google later added video functionality to Google Talk, also using the Jingle protocol for signaling. In May 2013, Google announced XMPP compatibility would be dropped from Google Talk for server-to-server federation, although it would retain client-to-server support. Google Talk has since been dropped from Google's line of products.

In January 2008, AOL introduced experimental XMPP support for its AOL Instant Messenger (AIM) service, allowing AIM users to communicate using XMPP. However, in March 2008, this service was discontinued. As of May 2011, AOL offered limited XMPP support. AIM service has since been discontinued.

In February 2010, the social-networking site Facebook opened up its chat feature to third-party applications via XMPP. Some functionality was unavailable through XMPP, and support was dropped in April 2014. In 2024, in response to EU Digital Markets Act Meta were compelled to enable a higher degree of interoperability between their products WhatsApp and Facebook Messenger (both closed XMPP implementations) and other XMPP systems. This describes a possible route for third parties to interoperate with Meta XMPP products, which is a much lower level of interoperability than true Federation.

Similarly, in December 2011, Microsoft released an XMPP interface to its Microsoft Messenger service. Skype, its de facto successor, also provided limited XMPP support. Apache Wave is another example.

XMPP is the de facto standard for private chat in gaming related platforms such as Origin, and PlayStation, as well as the now discontinued Xfire and Raptr. Two notable exceptions are Steam and Xbox LIVE; both use their own proprietary messaging protocols.

== History and development ==
Jabber logo

Jeremie Miller began working on the Jabber technology in 1998 and released the first version of the jabberd server on January 4, 1999. The early Jabber community focused on open-source software, mainly the jabberd server, but its major outcome proved to be the development of the XMPP protocol.

The Internet Engineering Task Force (IETF) formed an XMPP working group in 2002 to formalize the core protocols as an IETF instant messaging and presence technology. The early Jabber protocol, as developed in 1999 and 2000, formed the basis for XMPP as published in RFC 3920 and RFC 3921 in October 2004 (the primary changes during formalization by the IETF's XMPP Working Group were the addition of TLS for channel encryption and SASL for authentication). The XMPP Working group also produced specifications RFC 3922 and RFC 3923. In 2011, RFC 3920 and RFC 3921 were superseded by RFC 6120 and RFC 6121 respectively, with RFC 6122 specifying the XMPP address format. In 2015, RFC 6122 was superseded by RFC 7622. In addition to these core protocols standardized at the IETF, the XMPP Standards Foundation (formerly the Jabber Software Foundation) is active in developing open XMPP extensions.

The first IM service based on XMPP was Jabber.org, which has operated continuously and offered free accounts since 1999. From 1999 until February 2006, the service used jabberd as its server software, at which time it migrated to ejabberd (both of which are free software application servers). In January 2010, the service migrated to the proprietary M-Link server software produced by Isode Ltd, which was used until January 2023 when the service migrated to the open source Prosody server.

In September 2008, Cisco Systems acquired Jabber, Inc., the creators of the commercial product Jabber XCP.

The XMPP Standards Foundation (XSF) develops and publishes extensions to XMPP through a standards process centered on XMPP Extension Protocols (XEPs, previously known as Jabber Enhancement Proposals or JEPs). The following extensions are in especially wide use:

- Data Forms
- Service Discovery
- Multi-User Chat
- Publish-Subscribe and Personal Eventing Protocol
- XHTML-IM
- File Transfer
- Entity Capabilities
- HTTP Binding
- Jingle for voice and video

=== Internet of Things ===
XMPP features such as federation across domains, publish/subscribe, authentication and its security even for mobile endpoints are being used to implement the Internet of Things. Several XMPP extensions are part of the experimental implementation: Efficient XML Interchange (EXI) Format; Sensor Data; Provisioning; Control; Concentrators; Discovery.

These efforts are documented on a page in the XMPP wiki dedicated to Internet of Things and the XMPP IoT mailing list.

== Specifications and standards ==
The IETF XMPP working group has produced a series of Request for Comments (RFC) documents:

- RFC 3920 (superseded by RFC 6120)
- RFC 3921 (superseded by RFC 6121)
- RFC 3922
- RFC 3923
- RFC 4622 (superseded by RFC 5122)
- RFC 4854
- RFC 4979
- RFC 6122 (superseded by RFC 7622)

The most important and most widely implemented of these specifications are:

- RFC 6120, Extensible Messaging and Presence Protocol (XMPP): Core, which describes client–server messaging using two open-ended XML streams. XML streams consist of <presence/>, <message/> and <iq/> (info/query). A connection is authenticated with Simple Authentication and Security Layer (SASL) and encrypted with Transport Layer Security (TLS).
- RFC 6121, Extensible Messaging and Presence Protocol (XMPP): Instant Messaging and Presence describes instant messaging (IM), the most common application of XMPP.
- RFC 7622, Extensible Messaging and Presence Protocol (XMPP): Address Format describes the rules for XMPP addresses, also called JabberIDs or JIDs. Currently JIDs use PRECIS (as defined in RFC 7564) for handling of Unicode characters outside the ASCII range.

=== Competing standards ===
XMPP has often been regarded as a competitor to SIMPLE, based on Session Initiation Protocol (SIP), as the standard protocol for instant messaging and presence notification.

The XMPP extension for multi-user chat can be seen as a competitor to IRC, although IRC is far simpler, has far fewer features, and is far more widely used.

The XMPP extensions for publish–subscribe provide many of the same features as the Advanced Message Queuing Protocol (AMQP).

== See also ==
- Comparison of cross-platform instant messaging clients
- Comparison of instant messaging protocols
- Matrix (protocol)
- Secure communication
- XMPP clients
- XMPP servers
