= List of free and open-source Android applications =

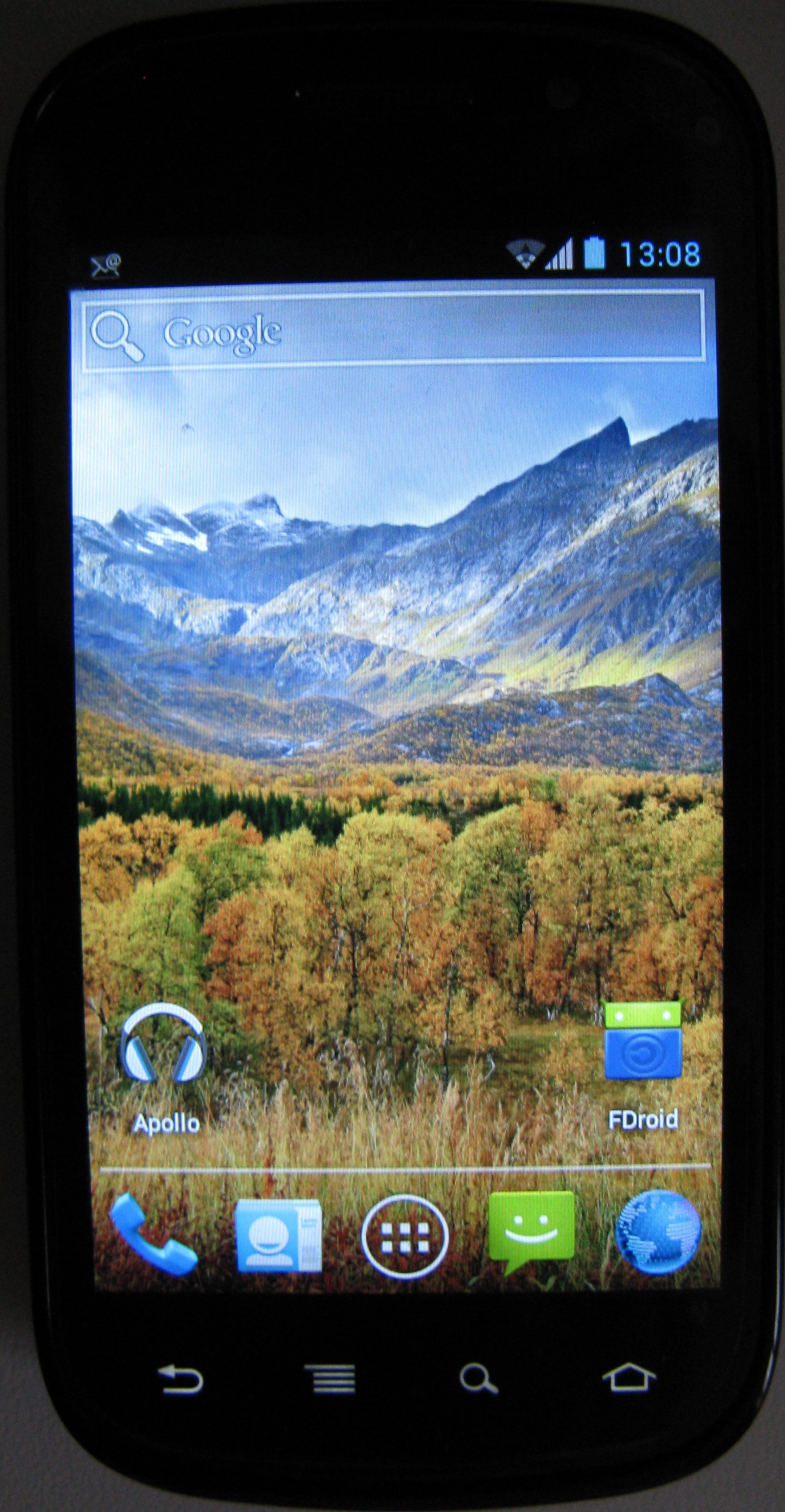
Android phones, like this Nexus S running Replicant, allow installation of apps from the Play Store, F-Droid store or directly via APK files.

This is a list of notable applications (apps) that run on the Android platform which meet guidelines for free software and open-source software.

== Advertisement blocking ==
Application name	Description	Availability		License	API (Note: The API column is used to describe which versions of Android each individual application is compatible with. If API column shows "5.1" then the application is compatible with Android version 5.1 or higher; "L7" or "L14" mean specific Android API versions.)	Note
Application name	Description	Google Play	F-Droid	License	API	Note
AdAway	Ad blocker	No	Yes	GNU GPLv3	L16 / 4.1+	
Adblock Plus	Ad blocker	No	No	GNU GPLv3	L7 / 2.1+	Standalone filtering app was removed from Google Play for breaching Play terms of service.

== Web browsers ==
Application name	Description	Availability		License	API (Note: The API column is used to describe which versions of Android each individual application is compatible with. If API column shows "5.1" then the application is compatible with Android version 5.1 or higher; "L7" or "L14" mean specific Android API versions.)	Note
Application name	Description	Google Play	F-Droid	License	API	Note
Brave	Chromium-based web browser with emphasis on tracking prevention, and reforming ad-blocking	Yes	No	MPL	4.1+	Has in-built ad blocker
Chromium	Primary code-base of Chrome; uses Blink and V8 engines	No	No	BSD	4.4+	
DuckDuckGo	Chromium-based; focuses on privacy & tracking protection	Yes	Yes	Apache 2.0	5.0+	
Fennec F-Droid	Rebadged fork of Firefox; aims to remove proprietary components	No	Yes	MPL	4.1+	Same with Firefox for Android, but some proprietary code removed.
Firefox for Android	Customizable with add-ons; uses Gecko engine	Yes	No	MPL	4.1+	Removed from F-Droid
Firefox Focus/Klar	Privacy centered browser; uses Gecko engine (GeckoView)	Yes	No	MPL	5.0+	
GNU IceCat	GNU Project version of Firefox	No	No	MPL	4.0.3+	IceCat contains features not found in mainline Firefox release and eschews all usage of proprietary components.
Tor Browser	Firefox-based browser enhanced for use on Tor anonymity network	Yes	Yes	MPL	4.0.3+	Available in F-Droid by activating the extra Guardian Project repository

== Office Suites and synchronisation ==
Application name	Description	Availability		License	API	Note
Application name	Description	Google Play	F-Droid	License	API	Note
Collabora Online	Office suite with Microsoft Office compatible word processor, spreadsheet, presentation, and vector graphics editor	Yes	Yes	MPLv2	8.0+	An enterprise-ready edition of LibreOffice
ownCloud	Client for synchronization server	Yes	Yes	GPLv2	7.0+	
Nextcloud	Client for synchronization server	Yes	Yes	GPLv2	7.1+	

== Communication ==
Application name	Description	Availability		License	API	Note
Application name	Description	Google Play	F-Droid	License	API	Note
ConnectBot	SSH, telnet, and terminal emulator	Yes	Yes	Apache 2.0	1.5+	
Element	Federated instant messaging and group chat client using the Matrix protocol.	Yes	Yes	Apache 2.0	4.1+	
Jitsi	Videoconferencing and instant messenger	Yes	Yes	LGPLv2.1	?	
K-9 Mail	Advanced email client	Yes	Yes	Apache 2.0	2.2+	Supports OpenPGP integration with OpenKeychain
Linphone	Video SIP/VoIP client	Yes	Yes	GPLv2	2.2+	
Mastodon	federated social network	Yes	Yes	GPLv3	6.0+	
Session	distributed blockchain-based messenger	?	?	GPLv3	?	Also available for iOS, Linux, and Windows
WordPress	Official WordPress client	Yes	No	GPLv2	2.3+	
Zulip	groupware and chat	Yes	No	Apache 2.0	5.0+	Also available for iOS

=== Privacy or security focused ===
Application name	Description	Availability		License	API	Note
Application name	Description	Google Play	F-Droid	License	API	Note
APG	OpenPGP and key management	Yes	Yes	Apache 2.0	1.5+	OpenKeychain available as more up-to-date alternative
Briar	Peer-to-peer encrypted messaging and forums	Yes	Yes	GPLv3	4.0+	
Conversations	Federated encrypted instant messaging and group chat	Yes	Yes	GPLv3	4.0+	Interoperable with any Jabber/XMPP clients. End-to-end encryption using OMEMO, OpenPGP (and OTR for versions under 2.0 and the legacy version). Uses traditional login/password with any provider account, instead of quicksy/phone number
Element (formerly Riot)	Decentralised, encrypted chat & collaboration powered by Matrix	Yes	Yes	Apache 2.0	5.0+	
I2P	Anonymizing network layer	Yes	Yes	Apache 2.0	2.3+	I2P also maintain their own F-Droid repo.
IVPN	Privacy-focused VPN service	Yes	Yes	GPLv3	?	Also available on Windows, macOS, and iOS; and undergo independent security audit.
Jami	Softphone and messenger utilizing DHT and strong cryptography	Yes	Yes	GPLv3	?	Formerly named "GNU Ring" and "SFLphone".
Lantern	Peer-to-peer internet censorship circumvention	Yes	No	Apache 2.0	?	
Mozilla VPN	VPN service	Yes	?	MPL 2.0	?	Also available for iOS, Linux, macOS, and Windows
Mullvad	Privacy-focused VPN service	Yes	Yes	GPLv3	?	Also available for Windows, macOS, and iOS
NymVPN	Privacy- and security-focused VPN service	Yes	Yes			Also available for iOS, Linux, macOS, and Windows
OpenKeychain	OpenPGP and key management	Yes	Yes	GPLv3	?	Integrates with K-9 Mail.
Orbot	Client and proxy for Tor anonymity network	Yes	Yes	BSD, GPL	1.6+	
Psiphon	Client for internet censorship circumvention system	Yes	No	GPLv3	?	
Proton Drive	Remote file storage, sync/share	Yes	No	GPLv3	10+	Integrates with Proton Docs and Proton Sheets. Also available for iOS, Linux, macOS, and Windows.
Proton Mail	Client end-to-end encrypted email service	Yes	No	GPLv3	?	Also available for iOS, Linux, macOS, and Windows, and Bridge app and website.
Proton VPN	Privacy-focused VPN service	Yes	Yes	GPLv3	?	Also available for Windows, macOS, and iOS; and undergo independent security audits.
Quicksy	privacy-focused and federated secured XMPP client, using phone number	Yes	Yes			Equivalent of conversations, interoperable, but using phone number instead of traditional id/password; support both PGP or OMEMO encryption plus Jingle for voice/video communication, and file transfers.
Signal	End-to-end encrypted instant messaging, voice and video calling	Yes	Yes	GPLv3	2.3+	Also available for iOS. The Android client is a merger of the former TextSecure and RedPhone apps.
Surespot	Encrypted instant messaging	Yes	No	GPLv3+	?	Also available for iOS. F-Droid build is based on forked repo.
Telegram	Client for cloud-based messaging platform	Yes	Yes	GPLv2	2.2+	Also available for iOS. F-Droid build is based on forked repo. Server uses closed source software.
Tox	Peer-to-peer instant-messaging	Yes	Yes	GPLv3+	4.0+	Alpha release
Tutanota	Client for end-to-end encrypted email service	Yes	Yes	GPLv3	8+	
Wire	Encrypted instant messaging, voice and video calling	Yes	Yes	GPLv3	?	Also available for iOS, Windows and OS X. Server uses closed source software.
WireGuard	VPN client	Yes	Removed	Apache 2.0	7.0+	Also available for iOS, Linux, FreeBSD, NetBSD, OpenBSD, macOS, Windows 7+ and others.

== Emulators ==
Application name	Description	Availability		License	API	Note
Application name	Description	Google Play	F-Droid	License	API	Note
Citra	Nintendo 3DS	Yes	No	GPLv2	?	
Dolphin	Nintendo GameCube and Wii	Yes	Yes	GPLv2+	5.0+	Requires device with support for arm64-v8a ABI and OpenGL ES 3 or above
Mupen64Plus	Nintendo 64 emulator	Yes	Yes	GPLv3	2.0+	Unofficial port as Mupen64 Plus AE.
openMSX	MSX	Yes	Yes	GPLv2+	?	
PPSSPP	PlayStation Portable	Yes	Yes	GPLv2+	2.3+	
RetroArch	Emulates multiple platforms	Yes	Removed	GPLv3	2.3+	
ScummVM	Emulates multiple gaming engines	Yes	Yes	GPLv2	1.5+	
Termux	Terminal emulator	Deprecated	Yes	GPLv3	?	
UserLand	Linux Emulator	Yes	Yes	GPLv3	?	
VICE	Commodore systems emulator	Yes	Yes	GPLv2	?	

== Games ==
Application name	Description	Availability		License	API	Note
Application name	Description	Google Play	F-Droid	License	API	Note
2048	Mathematics sliding block puzzle	Yes	Yes	MIT	2.2+	Port of 2048
Angband	Text-based roguelike	Yes	Yes	GPLv2	?	
Battle for Wesnoth	Turn-based strategy in a fantasy setting	Partial	Yes	GPLv2	2.3+	Ported to Android with SDL
Brogue	Roguelike	Yes	Yes	GPLv3	?	
Dungeon Crawl Stone Soup	Roguelike	Yes	No	GPLv2+	?	Text-based version also available
Fish Fillets NG	Underwater puzzle game.	Yes	No	GPLv2	1.6+	Port of Fish Fillets NG
Freeciv	Turn-based strategy game similar to Sid Meier's Civilization	Yes	No	GPLv2	2.0+	
Frozen Bubble	Tile-matching puzzle game	Yes	Yes	GPLv2	1.6+	Port of Frozen Bubble
GLtron	Lightcycle racing game	Yes	Yes	GPLv2	2.2+	Port of GLtron
H-Craft Championship	SciFi 3D racing game	Yes	No	zlib	3.2+	Media is proprietary, but free for personal use.
HyperRogue	Roguelike in hyperbolic plane	?	Yes	GPLv2+	?	
Luanti	Sandbox similar to Minecraft	Yes	Yes		?	
OpenArena	First-person shooter similar to Quake 3 (see: id Tech 3)	Yes	No	GPLv2	1.6+	Unofficial port by "pelya" using SDL 1.2
OpenTTD	Business simulation game similar to Transport Tycoon Deluxe	Yes	No	GPLv2	1.6+	pelya SDL port
Pixel Dungeon	Roguelike with pixel art graphics	Yes	Yes	GPLv3	?	Also available for Linux, iOS, Windows 10, Mac OS X
OpenTyrian	Vertical shoot 'em up	Yes	No	GPLv2	1.6+	pelya SDL port
robotfindskitten	A "Zen Simulation"	Yes	Yes	GPL	1.6+	
Simon Tatham's Puzzle Collection	Collection of puzzle games	Yes	Yes	MIT	2.1+	
Ur-Quan Masters	Source-port of 3DO version of Star Control II	?	No	GPLv2+, CC by 2.0, CC by-nc-sa 2.5	?	Game engine is free, but Star Control art assets are released under a Creative Commons non-commercial license. pelya SDL port

== General ==
Application name	Description	Availability		License	API	Note
Application name	Description	Google Play	F-Droid	License	API	Note
Dasher	Accessible text-input method	Yes	Yes	GPLv3	?	Also available for iOS
FetLife	Social network catering to the BDSM, fetish, and kink communities	No	No	MIT	5.0	Also available for iOS
GNU Emacs	Extensible self-documenting text editor	No	Yes	GPLv3+	2.2+	Version support is decided at compile-time and individual binaries may require more recent releases of Android. Also available for Unix-like systems (GNU, Linux, macOS, BSDs, Solaris), Haiku, Windows, MS-DOS
Google IO	App for Google IO conference	Yes	Yes	Apache 2.0	4.0	
OpenLP	Worship presentation software	Yes	Yes	GPLv3	?	
The White House	The official White House app	Yes	Yes	MIT	2.2+	

== Health ==
Application name	Description	Availability		License	API	Note
Application name	Description	Google Play	F-Droid	License	API	Note
COVID Alert	Canadian digital contact tracing app	Yes	No	Apache 2.0	?	Also available for iOS
DP-3T	Protocol and reference implementation of decentralized European contact tracing app	?	No	MPL 2.0	?	Also available for iOS
PEPP-PT	Protocol and reference implementation of centralized European digital contact tracing app	?	No	MPL 2.0	?	
TraceTogether	Singaporean contact tracing app	?	No	GPLv3	?	Available for iOS Data collected is available to police, and may be used in criminal or other types of investigations

== Multimedia ==
Application name	Description	Availability		License	API	Note
Application name	Description	Google Play	F-Droid	License	API	Note
AntennaPod	Podcatcher	Yes	Yes	MIT	2.3.3+	
Butter Project	Media player utilising the BitTorrent protocol	?	?	AGPLv3	?	
Jellyfin	Client for the Jellyfin Media Server	Yes	Yes	GPLv2+	5.0+	
Kodi (formerly XBMC)	Media player and center	Yes	Yes	GPLv2+	Multi	
Krita	Graphics editor for art and animation	?	Yes	GPLv3	?	Optimized for tablets and may behave poorly on phone screens. Member project of KDE.
Pocket Casts	Podcatcher	Yes	No	MPL2	7.0+	Released as open source software in 2022.
Popcorn Time	Media player utilizing BitTorrent protocol	No	No	GPLv3+ (AGPL exception)	?	In Nov. of 2015 PopcornTime.io ceased operations after court order from the MPAA issued in Canada.
Ringdroid	Ringtone maker	Yes	Yes	Apache 2.0	4.1+	
Rockbox	Media player	?	?	GPLv2+	?	
Tribler	Decentralized video sharing	Yes	Yes	GPLv3	3.0+	
Tux Paint	Simple drawing program for children	Non-free	Yes	GPLv2	?	Version on Google Play is published by a 3rd-party & contains proprietary ad libraries in violation of upstream developers' license
VLC	Media player	Yes	Yes	GPLv2+	4.2+	
Wikimedia Commons	Client for free media repository	Yes	Yes	Apache 2.0	4.4+	Old CommonsLab app no longer maintained. Current app is community-developed.

== Navigation ==
Application name	Description	Availability		License	API	Note
Application name	Description	Google Play	F-Droid	License	API	Note
Avare	GPS aviation application	Yes	Yes	BSD	4.4+	Complete *Aviation* EFB & nav app with all official current U.S.A. FAA VFR & IFR charts & data, plus limited free unofficial non-US materials.
CycleStreets	Bicycle navigation using OpenStreetMap	Yes	Yes	GPLv3	6.0+	
MAPS.ME	Offline mapping using OpenStreetMap data	Yes	No	Apache 2.0	?	
Mozilla Stumbler	Data gathering for Mozilla Location Service	Yes	Yes	MPL2	2.3.3+	
Organic Maps	Offline mapping using OpenStreetMap data	Yes	Yes	Apache 2.0	5.0+	Fork of MAPS.ME with proprietary bits removed.
OsmAnd	Offline mapping using OpenStreetMap data	Yes	Yes	GPLv3	2.3+	Some of the software is available at no cost. There is an unlimited paid version.
Navit	Car navigation using OpenStreetMap	Yes	Yes	GPLv2	2.3.3+	

== Reading ==
Application name	Description	Availability		License	API	Note
Application name	Description	Google Play	F-Droid	License	API	Note
FBReader	e-book reader	Yes	Yes	GPL	1.5+	
iFixit	Official iFixit reader	Yes	Yes	GPLv3	2.2+	
Kiwix	Offline Wikipedia reader	Yes	Yes	GPLv3	4.0+	
MuPDF	PDF and XPS viewer	Yes	Yes	AGPL	2.2+	
Wikipedia	Access to Wikipedia	Yes	Yes	GPLv2	2.2+	
Wiktionary	Client for crowd-sourced dictionary	Yes	Yes	GPLv2	2.2+	
Wikisource Reader	e-book reader for Wikisource	Yes	Yes	Apache 2.0		
XOWA	Offline Wikipedia reader	Yes	Yes	AGPLv3	4.4+	

== Science and education ==
Application name	Description	Availability		License	API	Note
Application name	Description	Google Play	F-Droid	License	API	Note
BOINC	Participate in distributed grid computing initiatives	Yes	Yes	LGPL, GPLv3+	2.3+	
Galaxy Zoo	Classify galaxies in crowdsourced astronomy project	Yes	Yes	GPLv3	3.0+	
GCompris	Educational activity suite for children aged 2–10	Yes	Yes	GPLv3	?	Member project of KDE
GNU Octave	Scientific programming language syntax with built-in plotting and visualization tools	?	No	GPLv3	?	
micro:bit	Interact with a micro:bit device via Bluetooth	Yes	No	Apache 2.0	?	Developed by Samsung. Depends on proprietary Google frameworks.
phyphox	Conduct physics experiments using device sensors	Yes	Yes	GPLv3	v3.0	Developed by RWTH Aachen University. Also available for iOS.
PressureNET	Crowd-sourced barometer network	Discontinued	Discontinued	GPLv3	Multi	Service and software discontinued
SageMath	Client for mathematical software	Yes	Yes	GPLv3	2.0+	
Sky Map	Planetarium software developed by Google, and Carnegie Mellon	Yes	Yes	Apache 2.0	?	Tracks user telemetry data via Google Analytics
Stellarium	Planetarium software	Yes	No	GPLv2	?	
Sugar environment	One Laptop per Child learning platform	Yes	Yes	Apache 2.0	2.3.3+	Ported as Sugarizer.
AnkiDroid	Flashcard spaced repetition for memorization	Yes	Yes	GPLv3	?	

== Security ==
Application name	Description	Availability		License	API	Note
Application name	Description	Google Play	F-Droid	License	API	Note
Bitwarden	Password manager	Yes	Yes	GPLv3	4.4+	
Haven	Monitoring system to protect against evil maid attacks	Yes	Yes	GPLv3	4.1+	Developed by Edward Snowden under the auspices of The Guardian Project, and Freedom of the Press Foundation.
Kali NetHunter	Digital forensics and mobile penetration testing platform ROM overlay	No	No	Various	5.0+	Developed by Offensive Security
KeePassDroid	Password manager	Yes	Yes	GPLv3	1.5+	Port of KeePass
ObscuraCam	Picture and video anonymizer	Yes	Yes	GPLv3	4.4+	Developed by Guardian Project and WITNESS
PasswdSafe	Password manager	Yes	Yes	Artistic License 2.0	1.6+	
Prey	Anti-theft and monitoring	Yes	Yes	GPLv3	4.0+	

== System and utilities ==
Application name	Description	Availability		License	API	Note
Application name	Description	Google Play	F-Droid	License	API	Note
Barcode Scanner	Barcode and QR Code reader	Yes	Yes	Apache 2.0	4.0.3+	
F-Droid	Graphical package manager for app repositories	No	Yes	GPLv3+	4.0+	F-Droid team also maintain an application repository
Impress Remote	Presentation remote control for LibreOffice	Yes	Yes	MPL2	2.3+	
Intra	Experimental DNS over HTTPS client	Yes	?	Apache 2.0	4.0.3+	
microG	Replacement for proprietary Google Play Services	No	?	Apache 2.0	?	
Mycroft	Voice assistant companion	?	?	GPLv3	?	
TWRP	Custom recovery image and boot manager	?	?	GPLv3	?	
TalkBack	Accessibility services for blind and low-vision users	discontinued	Yes	Apache 2.0	?	Integrated into Android and provided by other proprietary Google components
UserLAnd	Compatibility layer	Yes	Yes	GPLv3	5.0+	

== See also ==
- List of free and open-source software packages
- List of free and open-source iOS applications
- List of open-source mobile phones
- List of custom Android distributions
- List of open-source hardware projects
- Free Software Directory
