= Keep Android Open =

Advocacy campaign opposing Google's mandatory Android developer verification policy

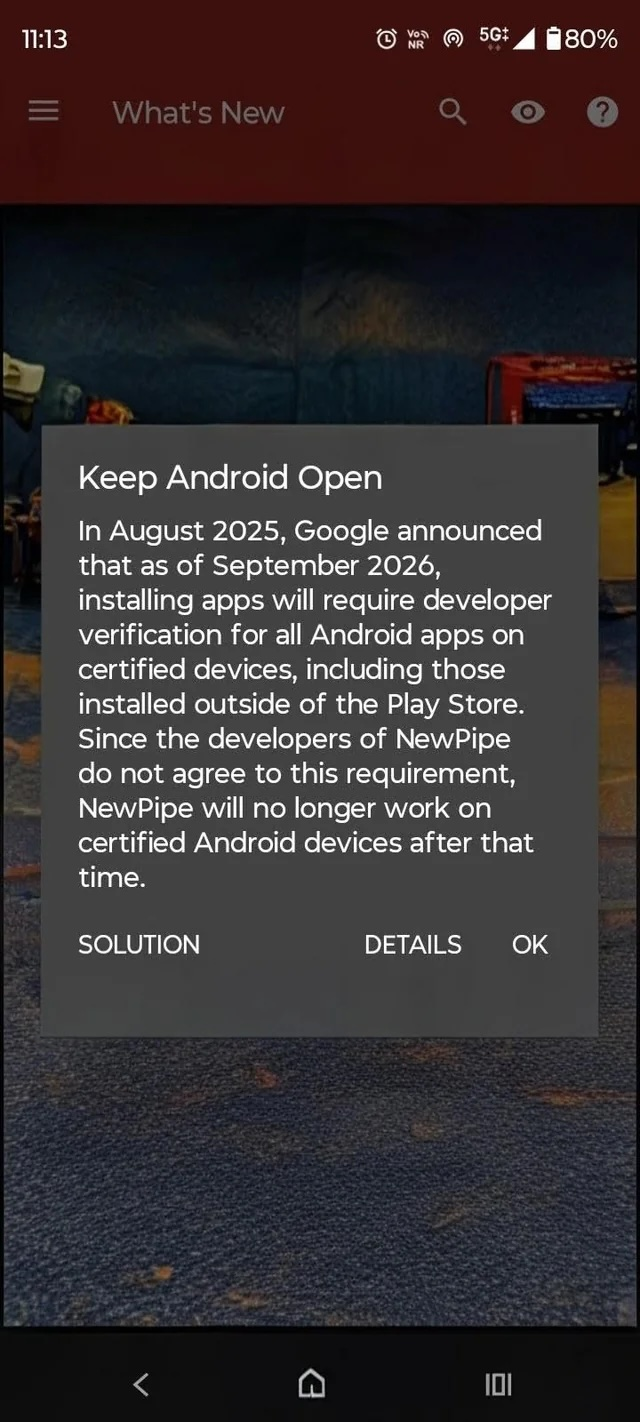
Alert about the Keep Android Open initiative, over the NewPipe app, during 2025

Keep Android Open is a campaign launched in October 2025 to oppose a Google policy requiring all Android app developers to register their identities with Google before their applications can be installed on certified Android devices, including via sideloading. The campaign by software developers and F-Droid board member Marc Prud'hommeaux is hosted at keepandroidopen.org. It has attracted support from free and open-source software organisations and digital rights groups, as well as technology companies, across more than twenty countries.

The campaign's argument is that the verification requirement gives Google unilateral control over which software may run on certified Android devices regardless of how it is distributed, threatening independent app ecosystems, privacy-focused or custom ROMs.

In February 2026, the campaign published an open letter to Alphabet Inc. leadership calling for the policy to be withdrawn; by late April 2026 it had attracted signatures from more than sixty organisations across more than twenty countries.

== Background ==
=== Android's sideloading model ===
Unlike iOS, Android has permitted the installation of applications obtained outside the official Google Play store. Users can opt-in for installation of unknown apps in their device settings, allowing them to install application packages (APK files) downloaded from third-party sources, shared directly by developers, or obtained through alternative app stores such as F-Droid.

This openness has been cited as a distinguishing and fundamental characteristic of the Android platform and has underpinned a broad ecosystem of independent software and alternative application stores, including custom ROMs such as GrapheneOS and LineageOS.

=== Google's announcement ===
On 25 August 2025, Google announced a new mandatory Android developer verification programme, which would force any app installed on a certified Android device, regardless of whether it comes from Google Play, a third-party store, or direct sideloading to be linked to a verified developer account. The verification process requires developers to:

- Provide Google with personal information including the developer's legal name, address, email address, and phone number;
- Provide government-issued photographic identification;
- Pay a one-time US$25 fee and create a Google payment profile;
- Agree to Google's Terms and Conditions;
- Submit evidence of the application's private signing key; and
- Declare all current and future application identifiers.

Google cited security as the primary rationale, noting that Android accounts for the overwhelming majority of mobile malware infections globally, most of which arrive via unverified APK files.

The company argued that tying distribution to a traceable real-world identity would reduce the ability of malware authors to re-enter the ecosystem after being removed from Google Play under a new identity.

Mandatory enforcement was scheduled to begin in September 2026 in Brazil, Indonesia, Singapore, and Thailand, with a global rollout planned for 2027.

== Campaign ==
=== Founding and early activity ===
Following the announcement, opposition to the policy coalesced in developer forums. Criticism focused in particular on the burden placed on small developers, volunteers, academics, and researchers who lack the corporate infrastructure or willingness to share government identification with Google. In late October 2025, Marc Prud'hommeaux — a board member of the open-source app repository F-Droid and operator of the alternative iOS app store App Fair — formalised the opposition into the Keep Android Open initiative and launched the campaign website.

Prud'hommeaux framed the policy as an antitrust issue rather than a security measure, arguing that the requirement extended Google's gatekeeping role beyond its own marketplace and into distribution channels it does not own. He estimated that 90–95% of Android developers were "somewhere between concerned and outraged" and began engaging competition regulators in the United States, Brazil, and the European Union.

=== Google's partial concessions ===
In November 2025, following sustained criticism, Google modified its plans in two respects. First, it announced a dedicated account type for developers distributing apps to limited audiences — such as family, friends, or small test groups — allowing distribution to up to twenty devices without requiring government identification or payment of the registration fee. Second, it announced an "advanced flow" for experienced users who wish to install applications from unverified developers: the flow requires the user to enable developer mode, confirm that they are not being coerced, restart their device, and authenticate with biometrics or a PIN after a twenty-four-hour waiting period.

Critics, including F-Droid and the Keep Android Open campaign, argued that the modifications did not address the central objection — that the policy extends Google's gatekeeping role to all certified Android devices regardless of distribution channel. The "advanced flow" retains compulsory additional steps and a waiting period, which campaigners contend treats adult users as incapable of making autonomous software installation decisions. The original enforcement timeline remained unchanged. The campaign judged the concessions insufficient and chose to escalate with a formal public letter.

=== Open letter ===
On 24 February 2026, the Keep Android Open campaign published an open letter addressed to Alphabet CEO Sundar Pichai, co-founders Larry Page and Sergey Brin, and app ecosystem vice president Vijaya Kaza. The letter called on Google to withdraw the mandatory developer verification requirement in its entirety. It argued that:

- Centralising developer identity data with Google creates surveillance risks and a potential vector for government compulsion;
- The requirement imposes barriers that disproportionately harm independent developers, researchers, nonprofits, and activists in countries where submitting government identification to a foreign corporation carries legal or personal risk;
- The policy extends Google's unaccountable app-review process to distribution channels outside Google Play, contradicting court-ordered obligations to maintain an open ecosystem; and
- Alternative app ecosystems, including F-Droid and privacy-focused custom ROMs, face existential harm.

The letter was copied to competition regulators worldwide.

==== Signatories ====
By late April 2026, more than sixty organisations from over twenty countries had signed the open letter. Signatories include:

- AdGuard
- April
- Article 19
- Associação Nacional para o Software Livre (ANSOL)
- Brave
- Calyx Institute
- Chaos Computer Club (CCC)
- Codeberg e.V.
- Cryptee
- Digital Rights Watch
- /e/ Foundation
- Digitale Gesellschaft
- Electronic Frontier Foundation (EFF)
- European Consumer Organisation (BEUC)
- European Digital Rights (EDRi)
- F-Droid
- Fastmail
- Free Software Foundation Europe (FSFE)
- Free Software Foundation (FSF)
- Ghostery
- GNOME Foundation
- GrapheneOS Foundation
- Guardian Project
- iodéOS
- KDE e.V.
- La Quadrature du Net
- LineageOS
- MetaBrainz Foundation
- microG
- Nextcloud
- Norwegian Consumer Council
- Open Rights Group
- Open Web Advocacy
- OpenMedia
- OpenStreetMap Foundation (OSMF)
- OW2
- Proton AG
- Rocky Linux
- Software Freedom Conservancy (SFC)
- Tor Project
- Tuta
- VideoLAN
- Vivaldi
- XMPP Standards Foundation

The signatories span free software foundations, digital rights organisations, and technology companies from multiple continents.

== Anti-trust investigation and litigation ==
Marc Prud'hommeaux and co-signatories of the open letter have engaged competition regulators in multiple jurisdictions. In the United States, Prud'hommeaux contacted antitrust officials in four states as well as the Department of Justice, citing the policy's interaction with remedies from the ongoing United States v. Google antitrust proceedings. Contacts were also made with Brazilian competition authorities (Administrative Council for Economic Defense) and European Commission officials responsible for enforcement of the Digital Markets Act.

Critics have noted an apparent tension between Google's simultaneous court-ordered obligations to open its payments ecosystem and its move to consolidate control over Android app development. Contemporaneous with the verification announcement, Google settled an antitrust lawsuit with Epic Games over Google Play Store's exclusivity deals with app developers and phone manufacturers. These deals were ruled anti-competitive practices, and Google was ordered to allow third-party app stores on the Play Store, to treat them as first-class within the Android ecosystem, and to let them mirror Google Play's catalog. The timing of Google's verification requirement rollout shortly after this settlement leads some advocates to accuse Google of using the requirements as an alternate anti-competitive control mechanism.

== Impact on the open-source ecosystem ==
The impacts of the verification requirement on developers are expected to vary significantly: little impact is expected on projects already using Google Play, or on apps installed using Android Debug Bridge and developers in US-sanctioned nations will neither be subject to verification requirements nor be able to get verified. By contrast, the requirements have caused significant outrage among developers of exclusively sideloaded apps and in the emulation community, because of concerns around government use of gathered data.

=== F-Droid ===
F-Droid, a repository of free and open-source software applications for Android, described the verification requirement as an "existential" threat to its mission. A significant portion of the software in F-Droid is maintained by individual volunteers or pseudonymous developers who build tools for privacy, security, or niche communities and who are unwilling or unable to submit biometric or government identification to Google. Since F-Droid's apps are installed with the repository's specific signature, Google's push toward having a single signature across all app stores would break current F-Droid apps. Were the requirement enforced on all certified Android devices without the carve-outs subsequently announced by Google, such apps would become impossible to install on devices used by most Android users worldwide. The September 2026 rollout of verification requirements will not include F-Droid or other third-party app stores, leaving the future of F-Droid yet to be determined.

=== Custom Android distributions ===
Devices running GrapheneOS, CalyxOS, or LineageOS and AOSP without Google Play Services typically operate outside Google's certification programme and do not include the Google Play Services infrastructure against which verification checks are enforced. As a result, users of such systems are generally unaffected by the policy as currently written. However, campaigners argue that the normalisation of identity-gated software installation sets a precedent harmful to user autonomy more broadly.

== Google's response ==
Google has defended the developer verification policy as a security measure designed to close a specific enforcement gap, stating that mandatory identity verification would prevent malicious actors from re-entering the ecosystem after removal from Google Play. Google has not published a formal public response to the open letter as of August 2026.

== See also ==
- F-Droid
- Android (operating system)
- Digital Markets Act
- Open-source software
- Electronic Frontier Foundation
- Software Freedom Conservancy
- GrapheneOS
- Internet censorship
