= Comparison of OS emulation or virtualization apps on Android =

There are many Android apps that can run other operating systems, for example with virtualization, terminal emulation, or sometimes installing Linux packages directly in the app. Some remote terminal access apps also have the ability to access Android's internally implemented Toybox, via device loopback support. Some VM/emulator apps have a fixed set of OS's or applications that are supported.

Since Android 8 (Oreo), some of these apps have been reporting issues as Google has been making big platform changes to Android, for example the implementation of SAF has been making it more difficult to use these apps and may even make them require root. Some apps have difficulties accessing SD cards. It is also been reported that some of the apps have trouble utilizing packages like udisks2, Open vSwitch, Snort (software), and Mininet, due to new hardware or Android API restrictions on apps that have been put into place in the recent years.

== OS emulators or VM Android apps ==
The following is a list of OS emulators and OS virtualization Android apps.

App Name	Type	Device architecture & OS version requirement	Guest OS architecture	Requires rooted device	Connection technologies	Ref.
Termux	Enhanced Terminal Emulator	Android 7.0 and newer	same as host	No	Runs as a terminal but has a Debian based package manager allowing server apps like Apache, nginx, sshd. An X11 extension allows even running GUI Linux.	
UserLAnd Technologies	Compatibility layer	/Android 5.0 +	same as host (sometimes emulates Aarch packages for ARM devices if "arm64" package is not available, but "aarch32" or "aarch64" package is available.)	No	SSH, VNC, XSDL (supports access from another app on the phone that links to these technologies.)	
GNURoot Debian	Compatibility layer	?/Android versions below 5.0	same as host	No		
AnLinux	Compatibility layer (utilizes Termux)	ARMv7, ARM64, x86, x86-64/Android 5.0 +	same as host	No	SSH, VNC (similar support statement like in UserLAnd.)	
VMOS (software)	platform virtualization app	?/Android 5.0+	same as host	No	Emulation inside app (none)	
Virtual Master — Android Clone	virtualization app	?/Android 5.1+	same as host	No	Emulation inside app (none)	
VPhoneGaGa	virtualization app	?/Android ?.?	same as host (support 32-bit programs)	No	Emulation inside app (none)	
AndroNIX	Compatibility layer (utilizes Termux)	ARMv7, ARM64, x86-64/Android 5.1 +	same as host	No		
proot-distro	Compatibility layer (utilizes Termux)	Android 7+	same as host	No	Uses user-space proot, somewhat slower because of ptrace overhead, but can run many Linux distributions. The 'root' user insie proot is just a fake root which is only available within the proot environment and cannot mess up Android even when Android itself is rooted. Can be used as VNC server as well.	
chroot-distro	Compatibility layer (utilizes Termux)	Android 7+	same as host	Yes	Same a proot, but it utilizes real Android root which has the benefit it runs at native speed (no ptrace overhead) but there is a risk in can break out of the 'chroot jail' which can mess up Android host as it shares its root user with Android root. Can be used as VNC server as well.	
LinuxDeploy	Compatibility layer	ARM, ARM64, X86, x86-64, emulation mode (ARM ~ 86)/Android 4.0.3 +		Yes		
Vectras VM	platform virtualization app	Android 6.0 and newer	x86, x86_64, ARM64, ARMv7	No	Emulation inside app (none)	
Limbo PC emulator	platform virtualization app			No	Emulation inside app (none)	
Android Virtualization Framework	platform virtualization app	Android 16 and newer	same as host	Yes	Fully virtualized (KVM) which allow running any VM on native speed, fully independent of Android. The root user of the VM is not shared from Android root.	

== Terminal emulation apps utilizing internal OS ==
App Name	Notes	Ref.
JuiceSSH	Other than just local loopback, the app can do SSH, telnet, and Mosh.	
ConnectBot	Other than just local loopback, the app can do telnet and SSH.	
Termius	Other than just local loopback, the app can do telnet, SSH, and SFTP.	

== See also ==
- Comparison of platform virtualization software
- List of computer system emulators
- OS virtualization and emulation on Android
- Mobile virtualization
