= Cryptee =

Document and image storage service

- Website type: Productivity software; Word processor; File-hosting service; Image sharing; Video sharing
- Available in: English
- Headquarters: Tallinn, Estonia
- Owner: John Ozbay
- Creator: John Ozbay
- Products: Cryptee
- Website: crypt.ee
- Commercial: Yes
- Registration: Required
- Launched: 2017; 9 years ago
- Current status: Active
- Content license: Open Source

Cryptee is a privacy focused client-side encrypted and cross-platform productivity suite and data storage service.

== History ==
Cryptee was founded in 2017, by John Ozbay, a cybersecurity researcher, commenter, and activist, to exclusively focus on providing a secure document editing service similar to Google Docs and Photos for everyone, with a particular focus on victims and survivors of domestic abuse, journalists and reporters.

== Software ==
Users can write personal documents, notes, journals, store images, videos, and various kinds of other files.

The source code of Cryptee is open source and publicly available to allow anyone to audit the service with ease, and help identify errors or potential vulnerabilities in a public and transparent manner.

Cryptee has a few key features that differentiate it from other services in the industry, such as its Ghost Folders and Ghost Albums features, built specifically with victims and survivors of domestic abuse, journalists and reporters in mind.

Cryptee allows users to hide (ghost) folders for plausible deniability also as known as deniable encryption in the field of cryptography and steganography, and ensure privacy even under coercion.

=== Features ===
Cryptee Docs' features include:

- To-do lists, Markdown support, KaTeX math and file attachments.
- cross-platform accessible, as it is a progressive web app.
- Bulk transfer from other note taking apps such as Evernote.
- Encrypted PDF and print-accurate (A4 and U.S. Letter paper-sized) text editing.
- Ability to edit docx files

Cryptee Photos' features include:

- Ability to create slideshows.
- Ability to store original quality of photos.
- Ability to tag photos for organization.

=== Commercial strategy ===
The company's commercial strategy is focused on offering to its users an open source and transparent Photo Storage, Document Editor and Cloud Storage services without trackers or advertisements as it seeks to compete with Google Docs, Google Photos and similar services through its offerings.

=== Privacy ===
Cryptee utilizes zero-access storage to safe-keep all users' sensitive digital belongings.

== Advocacy ==
=== Lockdown mode ===
In July 2022, to fortify iPhones against the Pegasus Spyware, Apple announced a new, upcoming Lockdown Mode feature in iOS 16, welcomed by many experts.

In the following weeks after Apple's announcement, in August 2022, the Founder and CEO of Cryptee, and privacy activist John Ozbay published their research detailing shortcoming of Apple's Lockdown Mode.

They demonstrated that enabling Lockdown Mode makes it possible for all websites and online ads to be able to detect if users have Lockdown Mode enabled or not. This was due to the fact that disabling web fonts (an attack surface) was detectable by websites.

=== Confrontations against Apple ===
==== On PWAs ====
In February 2024, Apple announced plans to kill progressive web apps on iOS devices in the EU, claiming it was to comply with the Digital Markets Act (DMA).

The announcement was criticized as anti-competitive by many in the tech industry, including by Tim Sweeney, the CEO of Epic Games.

In response, Cryptee started working together with Open Web Advocacy (OWA), an international not-for-profit digital rights group to advocate for the future of the open web, promote web browser choice on mobile operating systems through challenging Apple's anti-competitive third party browser engine ban, and to champion the use and equality of progressive web apps over native apps, by reaching out to the European Union's Digital Markets Act (DMA) team.

To better understand the consequences of Apple's decision to kill web apps, the EU announced that they "seek to investigate Apple over cutting off web apps", and that they sent "requests for information to Apple and to app developers, who can provide useful information for our assessment".

Apart from sending a response to the EU, Cryptee, along with the OWA, launched an open letter to Tim Cook, which in 48 hours, got thousands of signatories including European Parliament Members Karen Melchior and Patrick Breyer; and thousands of other developers and organizations from over 100 countries.

Consequently, 24 hours later, Apple backed off, and reversed course on its plan to cut off progressive web apps in the EU.

==== Ozbay's representations ====
Following the events, eventually on March 18, 2024, Founder and CEO of Cryptee John Ozbay represented the Open Web Advocacy group in European Union's Digital Markets Act (DMA) hearing for Apple.

At the hearing, OWA confronted Apple, accused Apple of "maliciously intending to undermine user choice", and stated that there was no defense for Apple's behavior. In response, according to the tech news outlet Ars Technica, Apple's spokesperson "seemed to dodge Ozbay's question".

==== Cooperation with the EU ====
Within a week of the hearing, the European Union announced a DMA non-compliance investigation against Apple and United States' Department of Justice filed an antitrust lawsuit against Apple.

A few months later, on June 27, 2024, Cryptee, in cooperation with EDRi — an international advocacy group, along with Article 19 — a British international human rights organization, Privacy International, F-Droid, Free Software Foundation Europe, Guardian Project and others have submitted a comprehensive analysis to the European Commission about how Apple's plans to comply with the Digital Markets Act are insufficient.

== Reviews ==
In a 2018 article, Wall Street Journal's MarketWatch reviewed Cryptee, articulating the fact that Cryptee offers zero-access storage for photos, files, documents and notes, and pointed out that:

"Being based in Estonia puts Cryptee outside the “14 eyes jurisdiction,” an international surveillance alliance of European Union and North American countries, making it less likely it will be targeted with demands for data".

In addition, the review highlighted Cryptee's Ghost Folders feature which ensures privacy even under coercion. In a 2019 article, Reclaim The Net named Cryptee as one of the "5 great privacy-focused Evernote alternatives to keep your notes safe", underlining that:

"When it comes to security, this app is state of the art."

and that

"When making this app, the developers thought about every aspect of security and have taken every precaution to make it as secure as possible.".

The review further underscored Cryptee's open-source nature, its strong encryption, and easy migration features.

In a 2021 article, The Verge reviewed Cryptee, pointing out that Cryptee, based out of Europe, is one of the main photo storage service alternatives to Google Photos, and that it's their recommendation for users who are "concerned about privacy and like the idea of encryption" as Cryptee "offers to keep all your photos encrypted using AES-256".

In a 2024 article, Beebom, enlisted Cryptee as one of the "7 best iCloud Photos Alternatives for iPhone and iPad", complimenting Cryptee's simplicity, its use of encryption to safeguard users' photos against hacking by not storing any unencrypted data.

The article also provided further attention to Cryptee's additional features such as such as Ghost Albums, slideshows, easy-to-use drag and drop uploads, tagging and users' ability to store original-quality photos on Cryptee, concluding that Cryptee is "a safe bet if you are on the lookout for a privacy-centric iCloud Photos alternative".
