= Ringdroid =

- Developer: Ringdroid Team
- Release: 27 October 2008
- Stable release: 2.7.4 / 8 May 2015; 11 years ago
- Written in: Java, XML (content language)
- Operating system: Android 1.5+
- License: Apache 2.0
- Website: github.com/google/ringdroid
- Repository: github.com/google/ringdroid

Ringdroid is an open source Ringtone creation utility application that runs on the Android Operating System. Ringdroid lets users record and edit audio files for use as ringtones, alarms or notifications.

== Features ==
Ringdroid has a graphical editor that displays the waveform similar to pro-audio software allowing users to select the portion of a song they want. Each audio section is highlighted with divider lines having handles for touch-dragging. There are also inputs for numerical values for the start and end points and controls to zoom in and out on the waveform. Users can save files as a ringtone, an alarm or a notification. Ringdroid does not have the ability to fade or loop.

Ringdroid supports MP3, WAV, OGG Vorbis, AAC, MP4, 3GPP, and AMR file formats.

== History ==
Ringdroid 1.0 was released in October 2008, a month after the launch of Android 1.0. Development continued through 2010 with several developers from Google contributing to the project. The last APK posted to the development site was in 2010. However, the last update in Google Play was on August 23, 2012. As of May 2015, the project has moved to GitHub.

== Fork and Continued Development ==
In November 14, 2022, a maintained fork of Ringdroid was created by althafvly to continue active development of the project.

The fork modernizes the codebase and includes:

- Updated target SDK for newer Android versions
- Compatibility fixes for modern Android releases
- Gradle-based build system support
- Bug fixes and performance improvements

The fork is hosted on GitHub:

- github.com/althafvly/ringdroid

The maintained fork is also distributed through official application repositories:

- Ringdroid on Google Play
- Ringdroid Android package at the F-Droid repository

The fork remains licensed under the Apache 2.0 License in accordance with the original project.

== Reception ==
Reception has been very favorable. As of February 2014, the Google Play Store lists the Ringdroid as being installed on 10,000,000–50,000,000 devices, with an average rating of 4.5/5 from over 190,000 reviews. It received 4.5/5 score in a review from AndroidTapp,. and "App of the day" from Pocket Lint, describing it as "Simple, effective, very smooth and fun." Several publications described it as a "Must Have".

== See also ==
- List of free and open-source Android applications
