= Holland's Next Top Model season 9 =

Holland's Next Top Model
- Season 9
- Judges: Alek Bruessing; Fred van Leer; Anna Nooshin
- No. of contestants: 13
- Winner: Akke Marije Marinus
- No. of episodes: 9

Release
- Original network: RTL 5
- Original release: 30 August – 25 October 2016

Season chronology
- ← Previous; Cycle 8 Next → Cycle 10

The ninth cycle of Holland's Next Top Model premiered on 30 August 2016 on RTL 5. Anouk Smulders returned as the show's host for the new cycle. Judges May-Britt Mobach and Dirk Kikstra were replaced by fashion blogger Anna Nooshin and fashion photographer Alek Bruessing. Fred van Leer remained in place as a mentor for the contestants, but also acted as a fourth judge at eliminations. The new cycle featured an emphasis on social media and branding, with heavier involvement from fans of the show.

The prizes for this cycle included a modelling contract with Touché Models valued at €50,000, an editorial feature for JFK magazine, a contract to become a blogger for the show's network, RTL, and a brand new Opel Adam.

The winner of the competition was 20 year-old Akke Marije Marinus, from Dokkum.

== Format changes ==
Keeping in line with the show's new focus on models as influencers, the cycle saw heavy involvement from the public nearing the end of the competition. The final three episodes of the season were all held live, though only the finale was held in front of a studio audience. At the beginning of the cycle's seventh and eighth episodes, all of the remaining contestants were put up for a public vote through SMS. These episodes went over pre-recorded footage of photo shoots and activities that the finalists had taken part in some months prior. At the end of these episodes, the results from the voting were revealed to the models in real-time.

The cycle also featured a comeback round through which one of the previously eliminated contestants could return to the competition. In contrast to the American version however, the viewers were not involved in the decision. Judge Anna Nooshin evaluated each models' impact on social media, and made the decision based on their networking growth over the course of the competition.

During the cycle's live final, Colette Kanza was brought back as one of the four finalists. Kanza had originally been eliminated in episode 6. For the first time in the show's history, the viewer vote decided the results of the live final in their entirety.

== Cast ==
=== Contestants ===
(Ages stated are at start of contest)

Name	Age	Height	Hometown	Finish	Place
Nynke Bakker	19	1.75 m (5 ft 9 in)	Voorthuizen	Episode 1	12
Cherie Fransen	22	1.75 m (5 ft 9 in)	Breda	Episode 2	11 (quit)
Lyanne Bierings	19	1.81 m (5 ft 11 1/2 in)	Berkel en Rodenrijs	Episode 3	10
Lena Damen	20	1.73 m (5 ft 8 in)	Veldhoven	Episode 4	9
Sarah Liebregts	18	1.75 m (5 ft 9 in)	Maarheeze	Episode 5	8–7
Arantxa Oosterwolde	17	1.75 m (5 ft 9 in)	Culemborg	Episode 5	8–7
Anne-Wytske Hoekstra	20	1.80 m (5 ft 11 in)	Renkum	Episode 7	6
Denise Bon	21	1.75 m (5 ft 9 in)	Wageningen	Episode 8	5
Noortje 'Noor' van Velzen	16	1.75 m (5 ft 9 in)	Leerdam	Episode 9	4
Emma Hagers	19	1.80 m (5 ft 11 in)	Mijnsheerenland	Episode 9	3
Colette Kanza	20	1.78 m (5 ft 10 in)	Rotterdam	Episode 9	2
Akke Marije Marinus	20	1.76 m (5 ft 9 1/2 in)	Dokkum	Episode 9	1

=== Judges ===
- Anouk Smulders (host)
- Alek Bruessing
- Fred van Leer
- Anna Nooshin

== Episodes ==
No. overall	No. in season	Title	Original release date
76	1	"Episode 1"	30 August 2016
The show went over the process by which the aspiring contestants were pared down to the final 12 after a mass casting with the judges. The finalists later met for the first time and took part in their first photo shoot session, where they shot their promotional photographs and filmed the show's opening sequence. At the end of the week Anouk Smulders visited the models with a final copy of the opening titles, and announced that the model not featured in the opening would be eliminated from the show. Ultimately, it was revealed that Nynke would not be moving on in the competition. After her elimination, Anouk revealed that one of the eliminated models would be given the chance to return.: Special guest: Freek Koster; Featured photographer: Alek Bruessing
77	2	"Episode 2"	6 September 2016[
The remaining 11 contestants began their week with a fitness session, and were later given makeovers. They also received a lesson on managing their public image on social media with judge Anna Nooshin, and had their Instagram accounts scrutinized for potentially damaging posts. For the shoot, they were photographed by Jakob van Rozelaar on the grounds of a country house as they posed with dogs and a male model. At elimination, Anne-Wytske was deemed to be the best performer, while Arantxa, Cherie, and Emma landed in the bottom three. Cherie decided to quit the competition, and the other two contestants were allowed to stay.: Featured photographer: Jakob van Rozelaar
78	3	"Episode 3"	13 September 2016
The contestants were taken to the gym, and had a yoga session followed by an ice bath challenge meant to test their concentration, where Denise was chosen as the winner. They later created cinemagraphs during their photo shoot with photographer Jasper Faber, in which they were splashed with buckets of water. At elimination, Emma was deemed to be the best performer. Lena and Lyanne were chosen as the bottom two contestants, and Lyanne became the third model to leave the competition.: Featured photographer: Jasper Faber
79	4	"Episode 4"	20 September 2016
The models attended a casting for Pretty Wild Lingerie where Akke Marije, Anne-Wytske, Arantxa, Denise, Emma, Lena, and Sarah were chosen to walk in a runway show at the MVRDV staircase in Rotterdam. Akke Marije was chosen as the challenge winner. They later had an eccentric photo shoot in which they had to abseil from the observation deck of the Euromast. Lena was unable to overcome her fear of heights, and had to have her session relocated to the lookout terrace. At elimination, Emma was deemed to be the best performer. Arantxa and Lena landed in the bottom two, and Lena was eliminated from the competition.: Special guest: Firouze Akhbari, Mandy Dionne Lieveld; Featured photographer: Stephanie Pistel
80	5	"Episode 5"	27 September 2016
The remaining eight models had a go-see challenge with designer Edwin Oudshoorn and Vogue editor Karin Swerink. Emma was chosen as the winner, and was selected to walk in a couture show for Oudshoorn during Paris Fashion Week. They later had an action-packed photo shoot session with photographer Dario Gargiulo in which they had to leap alongside an Opel race car. At elimination, Anne-Wytske was chosen as the week's best performer. Arantxa, Denise, and Sarah landed in the bottom three. Denise was given another chance, while Arantxa and Sarah left the competition in a surprise double elimination.: Special guest: Edwin Oudshoorn, Karin Swerink; Featured photographer: Dario Gargiulo
81	6	"Episode 6"	4 October 2016
The models attended a video casting for Huawei where Colette was chosen as the winner. They later had a glamorous jewelry photo shoot for Zinzi on top of a horse with photographer Billie Scheepers. At elimination, Denise was chosen as the best performer. Colette, Emma, and Noor landed in the bottom three, and Colette became the seventh contestant to leave the competition.: Special guest: Paul Braat, Hesling Reidinga; Featured photographer: Billie Scheepers
82	7	"Episode 7"	11 October 2016
The final five models were put up for a public vote at the beginning of the episode, and the show went over previously recorded footage of the models during their stay in Ibiza. Denise secured a cover shoot for Grazia with designer Nikkie Plessen, and the contestants were photographed by judge Alek Bruessing on the beach in a serene topless photo shoot where they had to pose as water nymphs. At the live studio, the models were accompanied by their friends and family as they awaited the final results. Anne-Wytske received the fewest votes, and she was eliminated from the competition.: Special guest: Nikkie Plessen; Featured photographer: Alek Bruessing
83	8	"Episode 8"	18 October 2016
The remaining four contestants were put up for a second round of public voting. The show went over footage of the models taking part in a casting challenge for Specsavers, where Denise was chosen as the winner. The models also went on tour to meet with fans of the show. At the end of the night, Anouk announced that Denise had received the fewest votes from the public, resulting in her elimination.: Special guest: Annemiek Melis
84	9	"Episode 9"	25 October 2016
The finalists performed in a series of live runway shows alongside the previously eliminated contestants, as well as contestants and winners from cycles past. Anouk revealed that Colette had been chosen as the returning contestant, and would be joining the three other models as the fourth finalist. The show also went over footage of the finalists' editorial shoot with Alek Buessing for JFK magazine some weeks prior, where the models had found out Colette would be joining them in the finale. Noor received the fewest votes and became the first contestant to be eliminated. She was later followed by Emma, and out of the two remaining finalists, Colette and Akke Marije, Akke Marije was crowned as the winner.: Special guests: Fais, Opgeturnt, Jayh, Anke Jabroer, Bo Kossen, Celine Koningstein, Daelorian van der Kolk, Debbie Dihllon, Lisa Kapper, Nicky Opheij, Nikki Steigenga, Rachel Swaab; Featured photographer: Alek Bruessing

== Results ==
Order	Episodes										
Order	1		2	3	4	5	6	7	8	9	
1	Noor	Lena	Colette	Noor; Sarah	Akke	Noor; Emma	Denise	Emma	Noor	Colette	Akke
2	Emma	Sarah	Sarah; Noor	Noor; Sarah	Sarah; Colette	Noor; Emma	Akke	Akke	Akke	Akke	Colette
3	Akke	Lyanne	Sarah; Noor	Arantxa; Akke; Anne	Sarah; Colette	Anne	Anne	Noor	Emma	Emma	Emma
4	Sarah	Noor	Anne	Arantxa; Akke; Anne	Emma	Colette; Akke	Emma	Denise	Denise	Noor	
5	Lyanne	Denise	Denise; Lyanne	Arantxa; Akke; Anne	Anne; Denise	Colette; Akke	Noor	Anne			
6	Colette	Colette	Denise; Lyanne	Emma	Anne; Denise	Denise	Colette				
7	Anne	Akke	Akke; Lena	Colette; Denise	Noor	Arantxa; Sarah					
8	Arantxa	Cherie	Akke; Lena	Colette; Denise	Arantxa	Arantxa; Sarah					
9	Denise	Anne	Arantxa; Emma	Lena	Lena						
10	Cherie	Emma	Arantxa; Emma	Lyanne							
11	Lena	Arantxa	Cherie								
12	Nynke	Nynke									

The contestant was eliminated
The contestant quit the competition
The contestant won the competition
