= Ciaran Gultnieks =

British computer game programmer (born 1970)

Ciaran Eugene Gultnieks (born 1970) is a British computer game programmer, whose projects include Star Wars (1988, for home computers), Dogfight (1993), Slipstream 5000 (1995) and Hardwar (1998) for the PC. He is the founder of F-Droid and contributes to the microblogging platform GNU social.

== Biography ==
Gultnieks was the first employee at Vektor Grafix, later moving on to work for Microprose and Spectrum Holobyte. In 1993, he co-founded development house The Software Refinery, which closed in 2002. In recent years he has contributed to various open source software projects. In 2010, he founded the F-Droid software repository, a catalogue of FOSS applications for the Android platform.

== Works ==
He is credited on the following games:

- Star Wars (1987), Domark
- Star Wars: The Empire Strikes Back (1988), Domark
- Fighter Bomber/Strike Aces (1989), Activision
- Killing Cloud, The (1991) Image Works
- Dogfight/Air Duel: 80 Years of Dogfighting (1993), Microprose
- Slipstream 5000 (1995), Gremlin Interactive
- Hardwar (1998), Gremlin Interactive
