= OEH =

OEH or Oeh may refer to:

- 2-oxopent-4-enoate hydratase, an enzyme
- Office of Environment & Heritage, a government department in New South Wales, Australia
- Old Engineering Hall, University of Pittsburgh, US
- Oswego East High School, Oswego, Illinois, US
- Daniel Oeh, author of the AntennaPod software

== See also ==
- O. E. H. Wucherer (1820-1873), a Brazilian physician
