= Linux Deploy =

- Developer: meefik
- Stable release: 2.6.0 / February 1, 2020
- Operating system: Android
- Platform: ARM, ARM64, x86, x86-64, and emulation mode (ARM ~ x86)
- Website: https://github.com/meefik/linuxdeploy
- Repository: https://github.com/meefik/linuxdeploy

Linux Deploy is an application that allows the installation of Linux distributions on an Android device. However, the Android device has to be rooted first before being able to install this application.

== See also ==
- Comparison of OS emulation or virtualization apps on Android
