= Avare =

Electronic flight bag

- Original author: Zubair Khan
- Developer: Apps4Av
- Initial release: 10 September 2012
- Stable release: 10.3.0 as of 2023-08-31
- Operating system: Android 5.01 Lollipop and later (*see Notes).
- Size: Varies with device and options, core app 610kb to 2.5MB
- License: Github
- Website: https://www.apps4av.com/

Avare is a free open source "moving map" aviation GPS, A/FD and EFB app for phones or tablets using the Android Operating System. The app uses any internal Android or compatible external GPS receiver to determine location, allowing real-time display of location, heading, speed, distance, time, and altitude on free U.S. FAA IFR or VFR aviation charts; or on select topographic charts. Included are 3D, ADSB-In and other advanced options. The user can access all relevant static current FAA official data and some non-FAA maps and data in flight without data connection (and without GPS for VFR), once data has been downloaded to the device. With an aircraft ADSB-Out transmitter and inexpensive ADSB-In receiver Avare can also display any available FAA live ADSB data in flight. Some advanced users also interface Avare with an auto-pilot or flight simulator.

== Basic Features ==
- Displays GPS location, ground bearing to destination, heading, speed, distance, altitude and other flight data.
- GPS IFR Plate and Airport Diagram location, A/FD, FAA charts, user maps and some unofficial Canada, EU and other charts.
- All navigation functions require only a GPS signal, with data connection only required for adding new charts or materials.
- With data or ADSB In connection, current conditions may be fetched such as: traffic, NEXRAD, winds aloft, TFR graphics and text, TAFs, and METARs.
- Free ADSB In 1090Mhz or UAT reception is available on many Android devices with a $10 "RTL" SDR.
- Compatible with StratuX open source dual channel ADSB In, and many commercial receivers.
- Compatible external devices may be connected via Bluetooth, WiFi or USB.
- It is possible to manually install the app on nearly any Android device running Android 5.01 Lollipop or higher.
- Many more features are now included or being added, as outlined in the app Description.

== History ==
Avare made its debut on September 10, 2012, as a basic open source moving map aviation GPS app with code hosted on SourceForge (now on GitHub) and free FAA charts adapted for display on Android devices. It was created by Boston area pilot and Android programmer Zubair Khan after he had grown frustrated with the selection of Android GPS aviation apps that were then available. His goal was to provide a free app with no ads and minimal permissions to eventually fully utilize all of the free FAA materials available online. Over the following year of rapid development Avare gained a greatly expanded feature set, with several volunteers actively working on extending ADSB-In options, along with selected charts and data for Canada and other countries. Many further new, extended and refined feature upgrades have been made since with contributions from an informal volunteer expert "Dev Team" (see recent Contributors List at this link:).

== Reception ==
As of May 17, 2024, the Google Play Store listed Avare as being installed on 100,000+ devices, with an overall rating of 4.8/5 from 6.31K reviews. Sporty's, AOPA and EAA reviews have also been favorable. Avare was one of six aviation apps invited to offer brief presentations at 11:45 am July 28 at the EAA Airventure 2014 event, and members of the Avare development team have attended Airventure subsequently.

== Notes ==
- Due to Android OS technical requirements, to offer full compatibility and enable some new features the minimum OS version requirement was increased in 2022 to 5.01 Lollipop and later for ease of installation and updates on the Google Play Store.
- Some earlier versions such as Kit Kat may still be installed using a Manual Installation (aka "Side Load") process but users will not be able to register, which is a requirement to use the app and load Avare's free converted FAA charts and materials.
- Some older devices and inexpensive new ones that are not innately upgradable to Avare's current OS version requirement may be able to do so after installing a free open source Android OS such as LineageOS *Further details are provided, and questions welcomed, on the Apps4Av Forum.

== See also ==
- List of free and open-source Android applications
- Global Positioning System
