= Android Privacy Guard =

Implementation of Pretty Good Privacy for the Android operating system

- Initial release: June 3, 2010
- Stable release: 1.1.1 (March 24, 2014; 12 years ago) [±]
- Written in: Java
- Operating system: Android (operating system)
- License: Apache License 2.0p
- Website: github.com/thialfihar/apg

Android Privacy Guard (APG) is a free and open-source app for the Android operating system that provides strong, user-based encryption which is compatible with the Pretty Good Privacy (PGP) and GNU Privacy Guard (GPG) programs. This allows users to encrypt, decrypt, digitally sign, and verify signatures for text, emails, and other files.

The application allows the user to store the credentials of other users with whom they interact, and to encrypt files such that only a specified user can decrypt them. In the same manner, if a file is received from another user and its credentials are saved, the receiver can verify the authenticity of that file and decrypt it if necessary.

The specific implementation in APG relies on the Spongy Castle APIs.

APG has not been updated since March 2014 and is no longer under active development. The development has been picked up by OpenKeychain.

== Reception ==
After its initial release in June 2010, it has gained a strong following with over 2000 reviews and over 100,000 installs from the Google Play store. Several tutorials have been written which instruct new users in how to set up APG on an Android phone. These tutorials generally reference APGs interaction with the K-9 Mail Android e-mail client.

=== OpenKeychain ===
Between December 2010 and October 2013 no new version of APG was released. In the light of the global surveillance disclosures this lack of development was viewed critically by the community. In September 2013 a fork of APG was released, version 2.1 of OpenKeychain. Some of the new features and improvements were subsequently merged back to APG. However, this process stopped in March 2014, while the OpenKeychain project continued to release new versions. As of February 2016 the development of OpenKeychain is more active than that of APG. Notable features of OpenKeychain include a modern user interface, support for NFC and the YubiKey NEO.
