= Jesse Vincent =

Businessperson and computer programmer

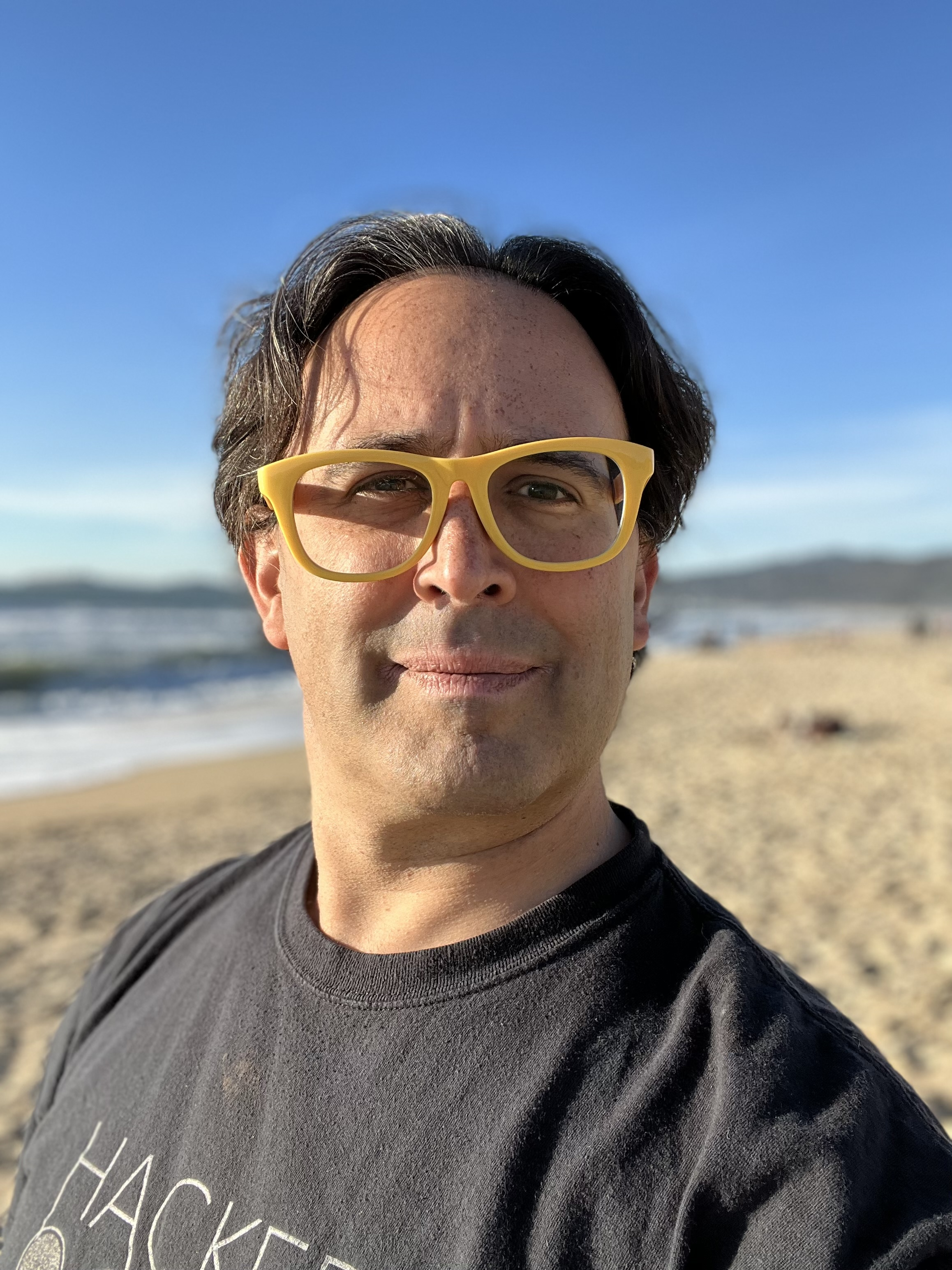
Vincent in 2022

Jesse Vincent (born June 21, 1976) is a computer programmer and entrepreneur, best known for his work with the Perl programming language. He is founder and CEO of applied research lab Prime Radiant, which developed and maintains Superpowers, an open-source agentic skills framework that drew widespread attention in the developer community following its October 2025 release. He also created the ticket-tracking system Request Tracker ("RT"), and founded the company Best Practical Solutions.

He created RT while working at Wesleyan University in 1994. Graduating from the university in 1998, Vincent founded Best Practical in 2001. He co-authored RT Essentials in 2005.

He is the founder and former project lead of K-9 Mail email app for Android (since acquired by Mozilla and rebranded as Thunderbird for Android).

In 2012 he became interested in the ergonomics of keyboards, having designed and built himself several designs. In 2014 he co-founded Keyboardio.

In 2021, he co-founded VaccinateCA, a community-run website for helping Americans find COVID vaccines.

In the mid-2020s, Vincent expanded his focus to include artificial intelligence and AI-assisted software development. In 2025, he published a series of posts on his blog describing a multi-agent workflow for software development with coding assistants (notably Anthropic's Claude Code). He outlined an "Architect/Implementer" pattern for running parallel agents and introduced the SKILL.md format for structuring agent workflows, one week before Anthropic released a native skills framework using the same format. The work drew attention from software-engineering commentators, including coverage by technologist Simon Willison.

== Perl ==
From 2005 to 2008 he served as the project manager for Perl 6. He was the keeper of the pumpkin for Perl versions 5.12 and 5.14. He changed the release cycle for Perl 5 from an irregular release done at the leisure of the project manager to a regular timeboxed release with development releases monthly and stable releases annually.
