= UserLAnd Technologies =

Compatibility layer mobile app

UserLAnd
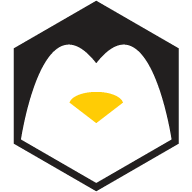

- UserLAnd In Use
- Developers: UserLAnd Technologies, LLC
- Release: October 17, 2018; 7 years ago
- Stable release: 2.8.3 / 9 October 2021; 5 years ago
- Written in: Kotlin and Java
- Operating system: Android
- Size: 14.04 MB
- Available in: 10 languages
- List of languages Arabic, Brazilian Portuguese, English, French, Japanese, Persian, Russian, Simplified Chinese, Spanish, Traditional Chinese
- Type: Compatibility layer
- License: GPLv3
- Website: userland.tech
- Repository: github.com/CypherpunkArmory/UserLAnd

UserLAnd Technologies is a free and open-source compatibility layer mobile app (With in-app purchases) that allows Linux distributions, computer programs, computer games and numerical computing programs to run on mobile devices without requiring a root account. UserLAnd also provides a program library of popular free and open-source Linux-based programs to which additional programs and different versions of programs can be added.

The name "UserLAnd" is a reference to the concept of userland in modern computer operating systems.

== Overview ==
Unlike other Linux compatibility layer mobile apps, UserLAnd does not require a root account. UserLAnd's ability to function without root directories, also known as "rooting," avoids "bricking" or the non-functionality of the mobile device while the Linux program is in use, which in addition to making the mobile device non-functional may void the device's warranty. Furthermore, the requirement of programs other than UserLAnd to "root" your mobile device has proven a formidable challenge for inexperienced Linux users. A prior application, GNURoot Debian, attempted to similarly run Linux programs on mobile devices, but it has ceased to be maintained and, therefore, is no longer operational.

UserLAnd allows those with a mobile device to run Linux programs, many of which aren't available as mobile apps. Even for those Linux applications, e.g. Firefox, which have mobile versions available, people often find that their user experience with these mobile versions pales in comparison with their desktop. UserLAnd allows its users to recreate that desktop experience on their mobile device.

UserLAnd currently only operates on Android mobile devices. UserLAnd is available for download on Google Play and F-Droid.

== Operation ==
To use UserLAnd, one must first download – typically from F-Droid or the Google Play Store – the application and then install it. Once installed, a user selects an app to open. When a program is selected, the user is prompted to enter login information and select a connection type. Following this, the user gains access to their selected program.

== Program library ==
UserLAnd is pre-loaded with the distributions Alpine, Arch, Debian, Kali, and Ubuntu; the web browser Firefox; the desktop environments LXDE and Xfce; the deployment environments Git and IDLE; the text-based games Colossal Cave Adventure and Zork; the numerical computing programs gnuplot, GNU Octave and R; the office suite LibreOffice; and the graphics editors GIMP and Inkscape. Further Linux programs and different versions of programs may be added to this program library.

== Reception ==
A review on Slant.co listed UserLAnd's "Pro's": support for VNC X sessions, no "rooting" required, easy setup, and that it's free and open-source; and "Con's": its lack of support for Lollipop and the difficulty of use for non-technical users. On the contrary, OS Journal found that the lack of a need to "root" your mobile device made using UserLAnd considerably easier than Linux compatibility layer applications, a position shared with SlashGear's review of UserLAnd. OS Journal went on to state that with UserLAnd one could do "almost anything" and "you’re (only) limited by your insanity" with respect to what you can do with the application. Linux Journal stated that "UserLAnd offers a quick and easy way to run an entire Linux distribution, or even just a Linux application or game, from your pocket." SlashGear stated that UserLAnd is "absolutely super simple to use and requires little to no technical knowledge to get off the ground running."

== See also ==
- OS virtualization and emulation on Android
