= Pretty Wild Lingerie =

Lingerie brand from the Netherlands

Pretty Wild
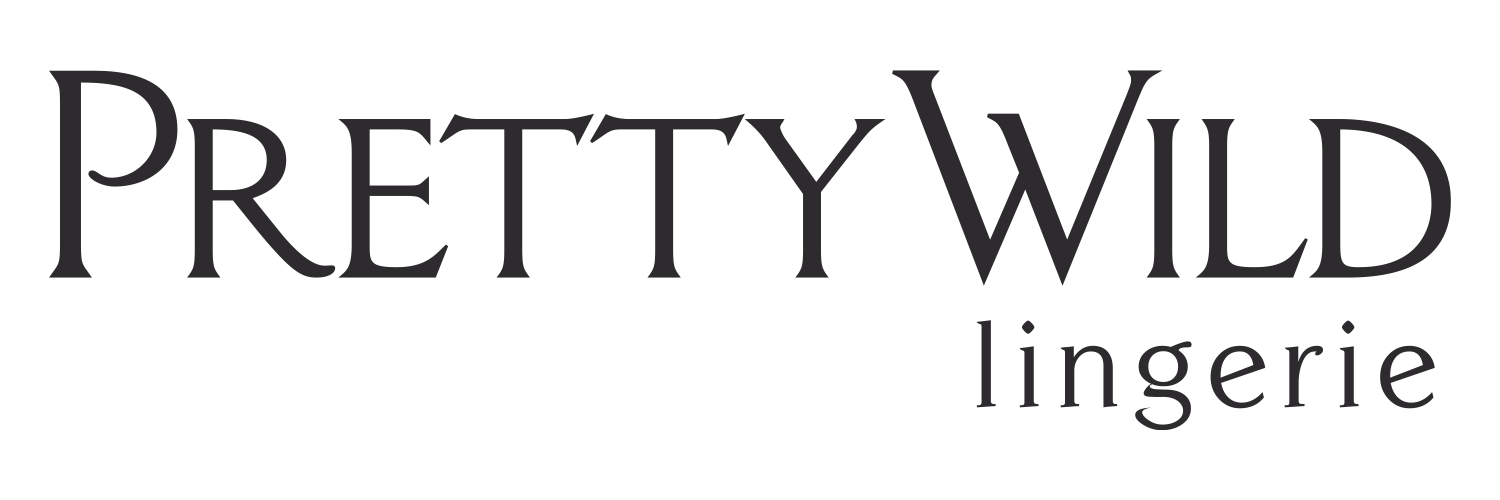
- Company type: Private
- Industry: Apparel
- Founded: 2011; 15 years ago
- Founders: Firouzè Akhbari
- Headquarters: Amsterdam, Netherlands
- Key people: Richard Kisembo (Chief Executive Officer)
- Products: Lingerie, Bras, Panties, Garter (stockings)s, Corsets, Hosiery, Bikinis, and Perfume
- Owner: SpaRotica SPQR Limited

Pretty Wild is a lingerie brand from the Netherlands. It was founded in 2011 by Firouzè Akhbari. In 2015, the company was acquired by Sparotica SPQR Limited (formerly MRH Sparotica Groupe).

== History ==
=== 2011–2015: Foundation years ===
In 2011, Firouzè Akhbari crafted lingerie pieces for clients such as Lady Gaga. Pretty Wild presented its first broadly distributed lingerie collection which featured lace from France and Italy in 2013.

The following year, the company secured a private label production agreement with Moldova-based lingerie manufacturer Olga Ceban Apparel with the assistance of The United States Agency for International Development.

In January 2015, Pretty Wild made its fashion week debut in Amsterdam, presenting at Mercedes-Benz Fashion Week Amsterdam.

=== Acquisition ===
In December 2015, Pretty Wild filed for bankruptcy. Sparotica SPQR acquired Pretty Wild and began a 5-year plan for expansion, which included 40 brick-and-mortar stores and the Chinese e-commerce space.

== Marketing ==
=== Broadcast events ===
In March 2015, Pretty Wild's Fashion Week Amsterdam debut was broadcast on Fashion One.

In September 2016, Pretty Wild appeared in Episode 4 of 2017 Holland's Next Top Model (cycle 9), hosted by Anouk Smulders.

=== Campaigns ===
The inaugural Pretty Wild campaign debuted in Fall of 2013, and was shot by photography duo Ronald Stoops & Inge Grognard.
