= Slipstream 5000 =

1995 video game

- Developer: The Software Refinery
- Publisher: Gremlin Interactive
- Producer: Anthony Casson
- Programmers: Ciaran Gultnieks; Ian Martin
- Artist: Mark Griffiths
- Composers: Chris Adams; Neil Biggin
- Platform: MS-DOS
- Release: July 1995
- Genre: Racing
- Modes: Single-player, multiplayer

Slipstream 5000 is a 3D airplane combat/racing video game developed by The Software Refinery and published by Gremlin Interactive for MS-DOS in July 1995.

== Release ==
The game was released for MS-DOS by Gremlin Interactive in July 1995. It was also distributed free with Classic Logitech Wingman Extreme Joysticks during the 1990s. GOG.com released an emulated version for Windows, Linux and Mac OS X in 2011.

Slipstream was an unreleased conversion of Slipstream 5000 which in 1996 was being prepared for the PlayStation's Japanese market (it was supposed to be later completely reshaped for its European release). Little was publicised about this game, besides its "urban manga" look as the ships were being designed by the Japanese manga artists. It was also in development for the Saturn.

== Reception ==
Reception

Review scores
Publication	Score
Next Generation	3/5
PC Gamer (US)	89%

Although sales were not very high due to stiff competition from consoles, the game was generally well received, having 3D graphics and gameplay advanced for its time. While it was soon superseded by console games with superior graphics, Slipstream 5000 was later described as having been years ahead of its competition. PC Gamer magazine US rated it at 89%.

Next Generation gave the MS-DOS version three stars out of five.
