= AdAway =

Android adblocker

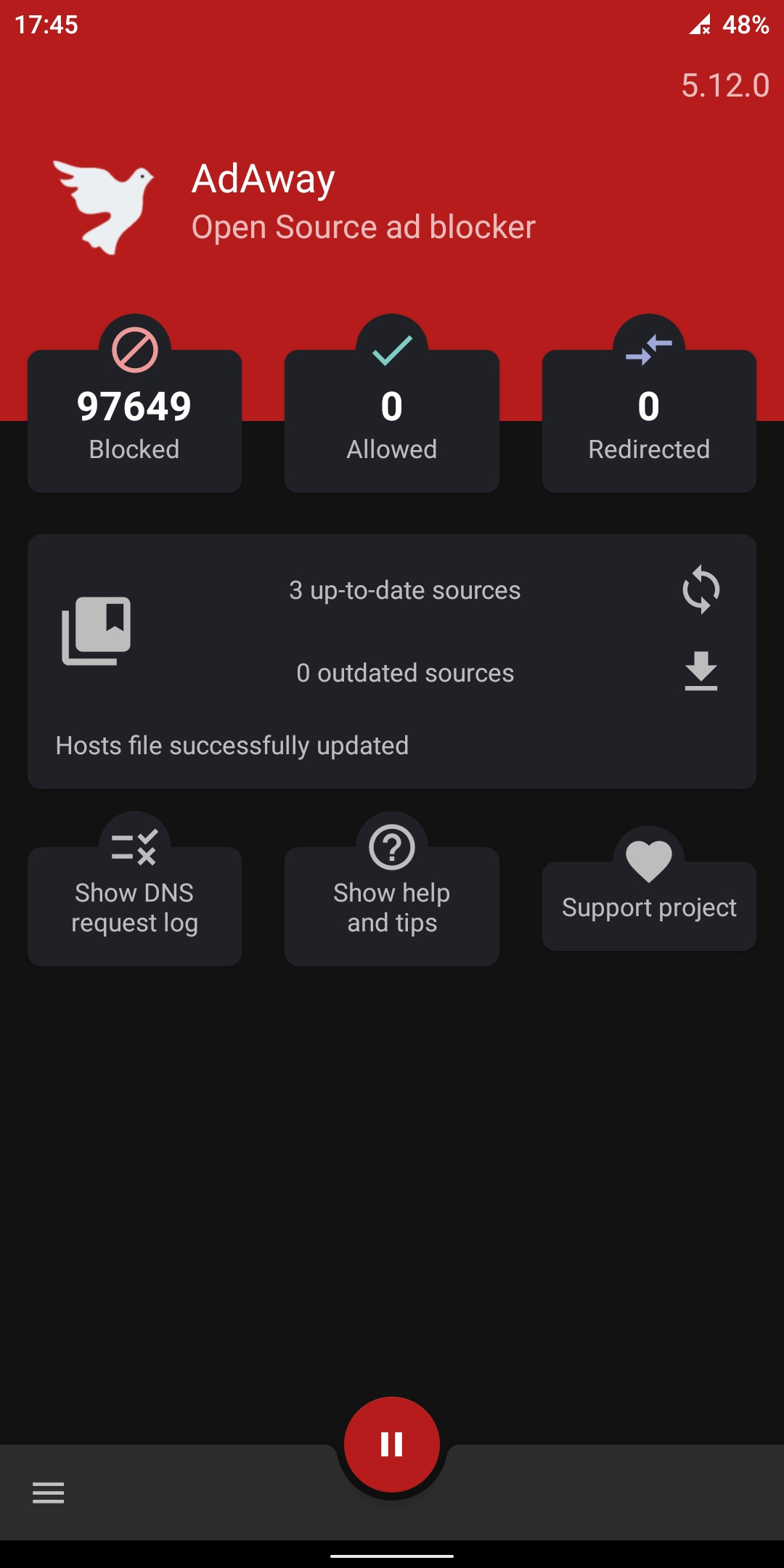
- AdAway 5.12.0 homescreen on Android 11
- Original author(s): Dominik Schürmann
- Developer(s): mrRobinson (former); PerfectSlayer (current)
- Stable release: 6.1.4 / 27 October 2024; 4 months ago
- Repository: github.com/AdAway/AdAway
- Operating system: Android 8 or later
- Size: 13.5 MB
- License: GPLv3
- Website: adaway.org

AdAway is a free and open-source ad-blocking application for the Android mobile operating system.

== History ==
It was started in June 2011 by Dominik Schürmann but is now maintained by other developers. In 2013, it was removed from the Google Play store along with other ad blocking apps. After its removal, AdAway used the app store F-Droid to serve downloads.

== Features ==
AdAway blocks ads using hosts files from various locations and combines them automatically. The user is able to block or trust additional domains, or add a new hosts file altogether. There is an option to log DNS requests to help in this task. AdAway requires in the actual version 5.10.0 either root access (because the hosts file is in the system partition) or the use of a local VPN on non-rooted devices, which is provided by AdAway itself. It is mainly used to remove ads on apps completely for free.
