= K-9 Mail =

E-mail application for Android

- Original author: Jesse Vincent
- Developers: MZLA Technologies Corporation, Christian Ketterer
- Release: 27 October 2008; 17 years ago
- Stable release: 20.0 / 23 June 2026; 2 months ago
- Written in: Java, Kotlin
- Operating system: Android
- Successor: Thunderbird for Android
- Type: Email application
- License: Apache License 2.0
- Website: k9mail.app
- Repository: github.com/thunderbird/thunderbird-android

K-9 Mail is an actively-developed free and open source email client for Android. It is designed as an alternative to the stock email clients included with the platform; it supports both POP3 and IMAP protocols and supports IMAP IDLE for real-time notifications. The project is named after the Doctor Who character K9.

K-9 Mail has been renamed to Thunderbird for Android since October 2024.

Previous logo

== History ==
The source code was first published to its git repository on October 27, 2008 by Jesse Vincent and the first binaries were released to the public on the Google Code site the same month.

In 2015 the project received $86,000 of funding from the Open Technology Fund.

On 13 June 2022, it was announced that K-9 Mail had been taken over by MZLA Technologies Corporation, a subsidiary of the Mozilla Foundation with current maintainer Christian Ketterer joining the team, and plans for K-9 Mail to be rebranded as Thunderbird for Android following the completion of a feature roadmap, including sync with Thunderbird on PC, integrating Thunderbird's automated account setup system, message filtering, and improvements to folders.

On 30 October 2024, the first stable release of Thunderbird for Android (Thunderbird Mobile) was launched as version 8.0. Thunderbird for Android can be installed via Google Play and F-Droid, among others. The Thunderbird team had planned in 2022 to maintain K-9 for one year after the release of Thunderbird Mobile, i.e. until roughly October 2025.

On 6 May 2025, the stable version 10 of Thunderbird Mobile and the beta of version 11 were released.

On 23 June 2026, the stable version 20 of Thunderbird Mobile and K-9 Mail were released.

== Reception ==
In the early 2010s it was widely reviewed, and was particularly praised in the media between 2011 and 2013 as a replacement for the default mail application. At the time, it was a leading alternative Android app, often recommended when a user did not want to use the default app. It was awarded the "Best App for Sending Email" in the 2010 "Best Android Apps" book.

== Features ==
- Works with IMAP, POP3
- Folder sync
- Encryption with OpenKeychain support
- Signatures
- SD card storage

== See also ==
- Comparison of email clients
- Firefox for Android
- Mozilla Thunderbird
