= Associação Nacional para o Software Livre =

- Country: Portugal
- Chairpersons: Jaime Villate, João Neves, Rui Seabra, Marcos Marado, Tiago Carrondo, Tiago Carreira
- Affiliations: Free Software Foundation Europe
- Revenue: 3,198 euro (2019)
- Website: ansol.org

The Associação Nacional para o Software Livre (ANSOL) (National Association for Free Software) is a Portuguese non-profit association dedicated to the promotion, development, research and study of Computing Freedom and its social, political philosophical, cultural, technical and scientific implications.

ANSOL is the official Portuguese associate of the Free Software Foundation Europe, and was launched in Porto on 12 October 2001, during the "Porto, Technological City" event.
