= PressureNET =

- Initial release: 8 October 2011; 14 years ago
- Stable release: 3.0 / 31 January 2013; 13 years ago
- Written in: Java
- Operating system: Android
- License: GNU General Public License
- Website: http://www.pressurenet.io/

PressureNET was a crowd-sourced reporting network for barometric pressure data.

It worked by having many users install it on cell phones having air pressure sensors (barometers) and GPS sensors. Once the location was known from the GPS data, it was able to send messages back to the server with the air pressure for that location on Earth. With enough users running the application it was possible to create useful, global pressure data. It used open source software running on Android phones, to collect data from locations around the world. The data was available on a public website.

With the announcement in September 2014 that the first apple device with a barometer (iPhone 6) was to be released, work started on an edition of the app for that platform The Sunshine app beta testing began to get some publicity in 2015.

The Android App website still exists, and the app source code is still available on GitHub; however, as of January 2016 there is no support for the Android app, and the iOS app is not free open source software as the PressureNet app was. PressureNet was acquired by Sunshine in early 2016.

== See also ==
- OpenSignals WeatherSignal
- Weather Underground (weather service)
