= Church software =

Specialized software for churches

Church software is any type of computer software specifically designed for use by a church. There are administrative packages tailored to handle membership databases and finances, and also worship presentation programs to generate images for video projectors.

== Worship presentation software ==
A worship presentation program is a specialised presentation program designed for displaying images (primarily song lyrics, often with cinemagraphs video background) during some forms of Christian worship. Some programs include other features to help plan the service or schedule participants.

There are programs available both commercially, as shareware and as free open source software (for example OpenLP).

== Church management software ==
Church management software is a specialized software that assists churches and other religious organizations in organization and automation of daily operations. These packages typically assist in the management of membership and mailings, fundraising, events, report generation, and bulletin publishing. Churches use the packages to reduce the cost of operations and track the growth in their congregations. The growth in the church management software business coincides with the growing trend of using computers for religious activity. In the UK, increased usage of such software is attributed to data management requirements such as GDPR.

Larger systems allow multi-user access, with security options to protect confidentiality. Flexible features to keep and report information on attendance and pastoral visits can help church staff manage members. Using a purpose-made package guards against relying on the knowledge of a specific individual to maintain a custom database. However, different church management applications vary significantly from one another, and what works well for one church may not fit the needs of another.

Free open source church management systems are also available.

== See also ==
- Bible software
- Contemporary worship music
