= OpenLP =

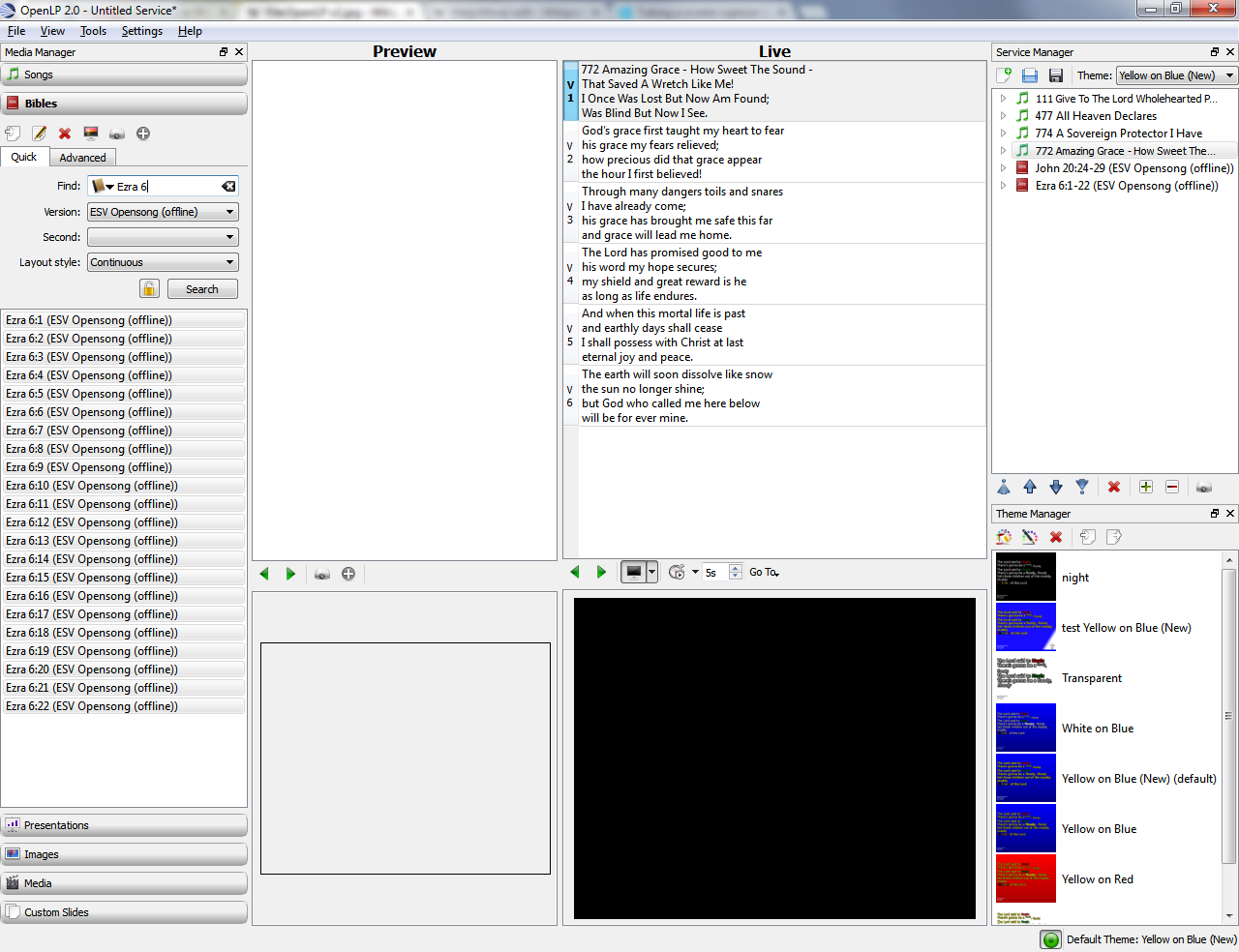
- OpenLP 2.0.4 in Windows 7.
- Developer: OpenLP Team
- Release: 2004; 22 years ago
- Stable release: 3.1.7 / February 16, 2026; 4 months ago
- Written in: Python/Qt5
- Operating system: Windows, Linux (Ubuntu, Fedora, Arch, OpenSUSE), Mac OS X, FreeBSD
- Type: Worship Presentation Software
- License: GNU General Public License v3
- Website: openlp.org

OpenLP is a worship presentation program licensed under the GNU General Public License version 2. It includes the ability to search through lyrics for certain words, search for Bible verses in the Bible, display lyrics and Bible verses in a friendly way to the congregation and interact with popular presentation programs to provide users with an easy way to control a presentation (with LibreOffice Impress, OpenOffice.org Impress or Microsoft PowerPoint). It also includes easy and instant switching between slides, customisable backgrounds, a song database, and video support.

== History ==
OpenLP was registered on SourceForge.net in February 2004 by Tim Ebenezer. The software was first released on 28 February 2004 as version 0.1, and contained the bare basics of the application. Version 0.4, released on 16 March 2004, was the first release with multi monitor support.

On 18 March 2004, the 0.x line of OpenLP officially entered beta status with the release of version 0.5. By version 0.8, OpenLP had implemented most of the desired functionality. Version 0.994 was the last release in the 0.x series of OpenLP, and was released on 11 October 2004.

In mid-2004 Raoul Snyman joined the project, and suggested some architectural changes. With this in mind, Tim Ebenezer decided to drop the 0.x line and rewrite OpenLP from scratch, with a redefined user interface. After various delays, OpenLP 1.0 beta 1 was finally released on 3 October 2005. At this stage, Tim also decided to rename OpenLP to openlp.org.

After the release of beta 1, Tim became too busy to work on openlp.org, and in early 2006 Raoul took over the project. After an extensive beta and release candidate program, openlp.org version 1.0 was released on 1 February 2008.

Initially, Raoul was going to work on a new version of openlp.org, version 1.2, in order to add fix up various faults in the implementation of the software, while a new group of developers would work on OpenLP 2.0, a new cross-platform version of the software. However, after looking at the progress of version 2.0, and consulting the other developers, Raoul decided to cease work on version 1.2.

In the meantime, Derek Scotney joined the project, helping Raoul work on bugfixes for openlp.org 1.0. When Raoul moved on to help develop version 2.0, Derek continued to support version 1.0 with bug fixes. In October 2009 Derek released a new version of openlp.org that he had been working on, one that provided a backing track feature that his church needed.

The OpenLP team released the first alpha version of OpenLP 2.0, OpenLP version 1.9.1, after about 18 months of development. This release was a preview release to show the community what the development team had been working on. It was at this stage that the team renamed OpenLP back to its original name. Since then, there have been releases every 3 months.

After over 2 years of development, the OpenLP team released their first beta of OpenLP 2.0 on 27 March 2011. With the release of this first beta, the OpenLP team announced that there would be no more bug fix releases for openlp.org 1.2, and that the beta release should be stable enough for most churches.

== Current status ==
=== Version 1.0 ===
Version 1.0 of openlp.org is no longer maintained. It was superseded by version 1.2.

=== Version 1.2 ===
Version 1.2.9 was the last stable release of the Delphi version of openlp.org. It was available for Microsoft Windows only. It is no longer supported.

=== Version 2.0 ===
Version 2.0 was the first version written in Python and Qt4, allowing it to run on most major operating systems including Linux, Mac OS X and Microsoft Windows.

=== Version 2.2 ===
Version 2.2 updated the code base to Python 3 and added support for video playback through VLC and presentation support via Libreoffice versions 4.0 and higher

=== Version 2.4 ===
Version 2.4 upgraded the code base from PyQt4 to PyQt5, in order to use Qt5 and the newer capabilities of Qt5.

=== Version 3.0 ===
Version 3.0 upgraded the code base and various new features.

== See also ==
- Bible software
- Church software
- Presentation software
- List of free and open-source software packages
