= Cinemagraph =

Photograph with animated elements

A cinemagraph; the grass in the foreground is moving slightly.

Cinemagraphs are still photographs in which a minor and repeated movement occurs, forming a video clip. They are published as an animated GIF or in other video formats, and can give the illusion that the viewer is watching an animation. A variation is a video snapshot (clip composed like a still photo, but instead of a shutter release it is captured using the video recording function with its audio track and perhaps showing minor movement such as the subject's eye blinks). Another variation is an audio snapshot (still photo linked to an audio file created at the moment of photo capture by certain cameras that offer this proprietary function).

Cinemagraphs are made by taking a series of photographs or a video recording, and, using image editing software, compositing the photographs or the video frames into a seamless loop of sequential frames. This is done in such a way that motion in part of the subject between exposures (for example, a person's dangling leg) is perceived as a repeating or continued motion, in contrast with the stillness of the rest of the image.

The term "cinemagraph" was coined by U.S. photographers Kevin Burg and Jamie Beck, who used the technique to animate their fashion and news photographs beginning in early 2011.

Adobe defines a cinemagraph as a picture "where most of the scene is stationary, while a section moves on a continuous loop.

== History ==
The first cinemagraphs were created by experimental photographer Rick Doble in 1998 in the early days of the Internet and digital photography. His animated work was shown as the Featured Artists on the Enculturation.net website in 1998 [Doble, Rick. "Animations." Featured Artists, Issue 2:1 -- On the Film/Image. Enculturation: An E-Journal for Cultural and Rhetorical Studies, vol. 2 no. 1, 1998., which is still online today. His work in this exhibit was reviewed in the article entitled 'A Site for Sore Eyes' in the Film-Philosophy journal of the Edinburgh University Press, Edinburgh, Scotland in 1998. [Martin-Jones, David. "A Site for Sore Eyes." Review of Richard Doble's animated GIF digital photographs. The Film-Philosophy Journal of London, United Kingdom (review of work at Enculturation Site: "On the Film/Image"), 1998. Volume 3, Issue 1.

Using an early basic Casio digital camera, in 1998 and 1999, Doble shot small (240x320) pictures in sequence and then sandwiched them together with GIF animation software. Many of these images meet the critera for being a cinemagraph, i.e., images that are mostly still but with a section that moves and repeats in a loop.

An example is Doble's 1998 picture entitled 'Rain' which was part of the Enculturation online exhibit. This image shows still plants behind a still screen but with moving continuous rain outside the screen. [Doble, Rick. Featured Artist. Cinemagraph image entitled 'Rain,' displayed in 1998 at the Enculturation.net website.

The first cinemagraph was recorded in 2011 when two photographers – Kevin Burg and Jamie Beck – put some movement into a photograph of model Coco Rocha for fashion photography for New York Fashion Week. "In the editing process, there's a moment when it all starts to come together, and it's magical every time. Even a simple blink is just so cool. It's like giving life to a marble statue", they commented.

== See also ==
- Time-lapse photography
- Ken Burns effect
- QuickTime VR
- Worship presentation software often employs cinemagraphs
