= AntennaPod =

Podcast app for Android

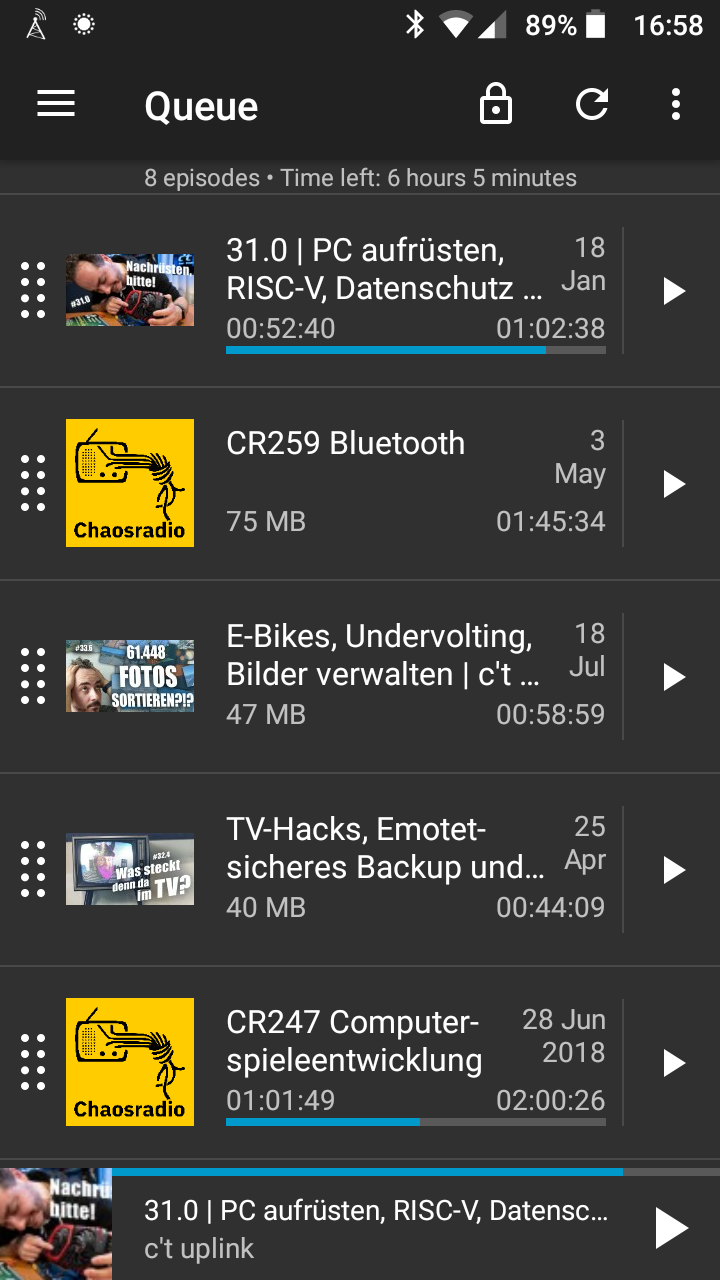
- Screenshot Screenshot of version 1.8.3
- Original author: Daniel Oeh
- Release: July 2012
- Stable release: 3.12.2
- Written in: Java
- Operating system: Android 6.0+
- Available in: 28 languages
- List of languages Arabic, Azerbaijani, Catalan, Chinese, Czech, Danish, Dutch, English, French, German, Greek, Hebrew, Hindi (India), Italian, Japanese, Kannada (India), Korean, Norwegian Bokmål, Polish, Portuguese (Brazil), Portuguese (Portugal), Romanian, Russian, Spanish, Swedish, Turkish, Ukrainian, Vietnamese
- Type: Podcatcher
- License: GNU General Public License version 3
- Website: antennapod.org
- Repository: github.com/antennapod/AntennaPod

AntennaPod is a free and open-source podcast aggregator app for the Android operating system.

== History ==
AntennaPod was originally released on July 22, 2012, as Version 0.8 and is licensed under the GPLv3 license. The app is a free and open-source software that aggregates podcasts. The app was featured on the crowdsourced BoringPhone - a phone intended to eliminate distractions that is an alternative to the mainstream Android phones.

As of August 2026, the app has been downloaded over 1,000,000 times in the Google Play Store and has over 95,000 reviews, which are largely very positive.

== Features ==
- Automatic update, download and streaming of episodes
- Variable playback speed
- Atom and RSS Feeds, including password protected
- Feed import/export with OPML
- Integration of Flattr
- Searching for podcasts and synchronizing with gpodder service
- Support of MP3, Podlove and VorbisComment chapters
- Support for paged feeds
- Dark theme

== Reception ==
In October 2013, Justin Pot at Make Use Of praised the app for being a simple podcast client which was also free of ads. Since then, AntennaPod has remained free of ads and open source.

From 2023, teachers working in government primary schools in Karnataka, are downloading AntennaPod, to access the audio story repository 'Kathe Khajane' (Treasure trove of stories), developed as a part of the 'Karnataka Language Education through Audio-storytelling based Pedagogy' (K-LEAP) program, of the DSERT Karnataka with IT for Change, a NGO based in Bengaluru.

In January 2024, AntennaPod hit 150,000 monthly active users on Google Play.

In April 2024, Kyle Bradshaw of 9to5Google recommended AntennaPod as the best open-source alternative to replace Google Podcasts after its shutdown.
