= Open Web Advocacy =

International digital rights group

- Open Web Advocacy Logo
- Founded: 2021; 5 years ago
- Founders: Alex Moore; James Moore
- Type: not-for-profit organization
- Purpose: Digital rights, Internet activism
- Region served: International
- Volunteers: 40
- Website: open-web-advocacy.org

Open Web Advocacy (OWA) is an international not-for-profit digital rights group, consisting mostly of individual software engineers who are advocating for the future of the open web. The group was formed in 2021 by Alex Moore and James Moore to advocate for the future of the open web by providing regulators, legislators and policy makers the intricate technical details that they need to understand to address the major anti-competitive issues with big tech companies.

OWA presents research, assists regulators, legislators and policy makers, promotes web browser choice by means of challenging large technology companies' anti-competitive third party browser engine bans, champions the use and equality of progressive web apps over native apps.

== History ==
Open Web Advocacy group was formed in 2021 by Alex Moore and James Moore to challenge Apple's anti-competitive rules around web browsers and third party browser engines for the App Store. At the time of foundation, OWA's primary concern was Apple's iOS App Store Guidelines, which require every browser running on iPhones and iPads to be based on WebKit, the open source project overseen by Apple that serves as the rendering engine for the company's Safari (web browser).

In October 2023, Open Web Advocacy group was granted half a million dollars by Jack Dorsey's public fund Start Small Foundation.

== Advocacy ==
In February 2022, OWA started its advocacy activities by communicating with the United Kingdom Competition & Markets Authority (CMA) to convince the agency that Apple's iOS browser policy harms competition. The group, their responses and advocacy efforts were extensively cited in both the interim and final versions of the CMA's Mobile ecosystems market study investigation report.

In August 2022, it was reported that after complaints from the OWA, the European Commission added a section focused on browser developers, as well as browser engines and their potential to be abused in an anticompetitive fashion to the Digital Markets Act (DMA), which imposes penalties on companies that haven't adopted EU's recommendations by 2024.

In September 2022, Australian Competition & Consumer Commission (ACCC) published its 214-page Digital Platform Services Inquiry interim report, which among many topics talks about browsers and progressive web apps, and widely cited Open Web Advocacy group's 14-page response to ACCC, covering issues around Apple's third party browser engine ban on iOS devices and its effect on the open web as a whole.

In March 2023, Open Web Advocacy group took the stage to talk at the European Union DMA Apple workshop, where OWA's founder Alex Moore, talked about the web, web apps, and their importance to the future of mobile ecosystems.

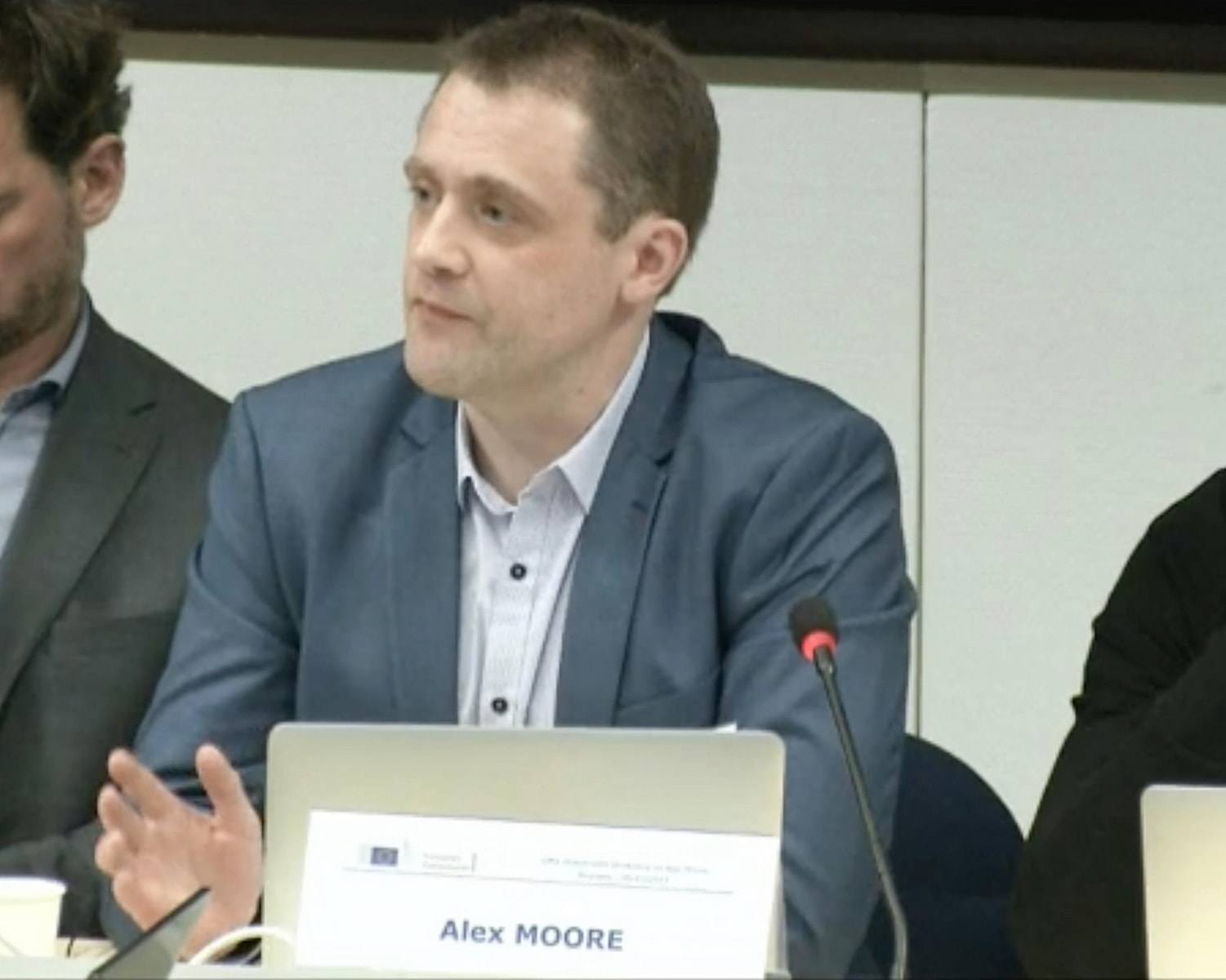
Alex Moore (founder) at the Apple EU hearing from 2023

In June 2023, the office of the Prime Minister of Japan published the summary of their Competition Assessment of the Mobile Ecosystem Report, in which they highlighted Open Web Advocacy's research under the browser functionality restrictions section of the report, which is about Apple's WebKit-browser-engine mandate for all third party browsers on iOS.

In September 2023, the Linux Foundation published a research document titled A New Direction for the Mobile Industry mentioning that Open Web Advocacy's advocacy work around the web and web apps had the biggest impact in helping the regulators.

In November 2023, Open Web Advocacy submitted a response to EU's DMA investigation into Apple iPad OS, expressing their view that Apple's attempting to avoid regulation in the EU by making a claim that it offers not one but three distinct web browsers, all named Safari.

In January, 2024, Mozilla published a letter calling out Apple, Google and Microsoft, in an attempt to document the Uneven Playing Field for an Independent Browser Like Firefox, in which they were particularly appreciative of Open Web Advocacy's advocacy work.

In March 2024, representing the Open Web Advocacy group, John Ozbay attended the European Union's DMA workshop hearing for Apple, where OWA confronted Apple, accused Apple of "maliciously" intending "to undermine user choice", and stated that there was no defense for Apple's behavior.In response, -according to the tech news outlet Ars Technica-, Apple's spokesperson "seemed to dodge Ozbay's question". Within a week of the workshop hearing, the European Union announced a DMA non-compliance investigation against Apple.

On the 21st of March 2024, the United States Department of Justice filed an antitrust lawsuit against Apple, where in the complaint they stated “Developers cannot avoid Apple’s control of app distribution and app creation by making web apps” and “Apple can still control the functionality of web apps because Apple requires all web browsers on the iPhone to use WebKit, Apple’s browser engine”.

On June 12, 2024, Japan's parliament passed a bill to encourage free competition in app marketplaces, allowing third-party app stores on Android and iOS, following the example set forth by the European Union's DMA. The bill is based on the Competition Assessment of the Mobile Ecosystem, released in June 2023 by the Chief Cabinet Secretary of Japan, in which they highlighted Open Web Advocacy's research under the browser functionality restrictions section of the report.

=== Open Letters ===
In June 2023, in a letter to the UK Prime Minister Rishi Sunak, Open Web Advocacy, together with organizations such as Coalition for App Fairness, DuckDuckGo, Expedia Group, Skyscanner and many others, have called on Rishi Sunak to unleash the full potential of the UK's digital economy by maintaining a robust and flexible appeals process in the new regime for digital markets.

In February, 2024, following Apple's decision to remove Web Apps from iOS and Safari in the European Union (EU), Open Web Advocacy published an open letter to Tim Cook, expressing their concern. During the first 48 hours, the letter attracted thousands of signatories including: Members of the European Parliament (Karen Melchior and Patrick Breyer); and thousands of other developers and organizations. As a result, the following day, Apple backed off, and reversed course on plan to cut off progressive web apps in the EU.

== See also ==
- Digital rights
- Electronic Frontier Foundation
- European Digital Rights (EDRi)
- Electronic Frontier Canada
- Electronic Frontiers Australia
- Information freedom
- Internet censorship
- League for Programming Freedom
- OpenMedia.ca
- Open Rights Group (UK-based)
