= F-Droid =

Free and open source Android app repository

- F-Droid interface on a Pixel running LineageOS
- Developer: Ciaran Gultnieks
- Release: 29 September 2010; 16 years ago
- Stable release: 1.14 (25 January 2022; 6 August 2021; 18 May 2022; 26 October 2022; 2 December 2022; 23 December 2022; 13 January 2023; 12 February 2023; 1 March 2023; 1 April 2023; 6 April 2023; 22 July 2023; 12 July 2023; 10 October 2024; 16 January 2025; 22 May 2025; 22 July 2025; 18 February 2026; 22 September 2026; 27 September 2026; 6 October 2026; 29 October 2026;)
- Written in: Python (server tools), Jekyll (site), Java (client), Kotlin (client)
- Operating system: Android (client), Linux, macOS, Windows 10, Windows 11, FreeBSD (server)
- Type: Digital distribution of free software, Software repository
- License: GNU Affero General Public License, version 3.0 or later
- Website: f-droid.org
- Repository: gitlab.com/fdroid/

F-Droid is a free and open source (FOSS) app store and software repository for Android, serving a similar function to the Google Play Store. The main repository, hosted by the project, contains only free and open source apps. Applications can be browsed, downloaded, and installed from the F-Droid website or the client app without registering an account. "Anti-features" such as advertising, user tracking, or dependence on non-free software are flagged in app descriptions.

The website also offers the source code of applications it hosts, as well as the software running the F-Droid server, allowing anyone to set up their own app repository.

== History ==
F-Droid was founded by Ciaran Gultnieks in 2010. The client was forked from Aptoide's source code. The project was initially run by the English nonprofit F-Droid Limited. As of 2021, F-Droid Limited was no longer used for donations, and was being shut down, according to spokesman Hans-Cristoph Steiner.

In a 2014 interview for Free Software Foundation, Gultnieks said he was inspired to launch F-Droid because of "lock-down, lock-in and general nefarious behaviour from software" on phones.

From 2010 to 2015, F-Droid used the AGPL-licensed Gitorious repository system for development. In 2015, it transitioned to proprietary licensed GitLab when Gitorious was acquired by GitLab. According to Daniel Marti, Former F-Droid Developer, in 2013, the removal of AdAway from the Google Play Store caused a spike in searches and downloads of F-Droid, and he estimated there were 30 to 40 thousand users.

Replicant, a fully free software Android operating system, previously used F-Droid as its default and recommended app store. In 2016, the Replicant project determined F-Droid did not comply with GNU Free System Distribution Guidelines, because some of the software it offers promotes or depends on non-free software. Replicant asked for assistance correcting it, but progress stalled. In June 2022, Replicant announced they had removed F-Droid.

Guardian Project, a suite of free and secure Android applications, started running its own F-Droid repository in early 2012. In 2012, Free Software Foundation Europe featured F-Droid in their Free Your Android! campaign to raise awareness of the privacy and security risks of proprietary software.

In 2014, F-Droid was chosen as part of the GNU Project's GNU a Day initiative during their 30th anniversary to encourage more use of free software.

In January 2016, Hans-Christoph Steiner, a developer for Calyx Institute, Debian, F-Droid, and Guardian Project, said F-Droid was focusing on issues like security, building with Debian, reproducible builds, software requiring trust of as few people as possible, transparency, user privacy, non-internet distribution of apps, block avoidance, and media distribution.

In March 2016, F-Droid partnered with the Guardian Project and CopperheadOS with the goal of creating, "a solution that can be verifiably trusted from the operating system, through the network and network services, all the way up to the app stores and apps themselves". Follow-on project GrapheneOS does not include F-Droid, and is developing their own app distribution method for "higher robustness and security".

On 16 July 2019, the project published a "Public Statement on Neutrality of Free Software". This statement was issued to address the project's failure to prevent "oppression or harassment ... at its communication channels, including its forum", controversy surrounding alt-tech social media website Gab, and to explain how Fediverse client Tusky blocking access to it, while client Fedilab allowed its users to choose, was consistent with their principles. Action was considered against several applications, including Purism's Librem One, to exclude them for allowing access to sites such as Gab or spinster.xyz.

According to Ankush Das writing for ItsFoss.com in 2021, F-Droid is known for hosting open-source apps such as Element or Tusky (later reinstated) that have been removed from Google Play Store.

On 24 February 2026, an open letter was created on the F-Droid website in response to an announcement by Google stating their intent to require all apps to be "registered by verified developers in order to be installed on certified Android devices" by September 2026. Alongside this, a banner providing notice and linking to Keep Android Open was instated across the entire website around the same time.

In September 2026, F-Droid released F-Droid 2.0, a redesign of the app in Kotlin. The update included a new user interface, an expanded categories section with filtering, a unified installer with a pre-approved API, improved search, and allowing multiple downloads.

== Scope of project ==
The F-Droid website lists the apps hosted, over 3,800; the Google Play Store lists about 1.6 million apps. The project incorporates several software sub-projects:

- Client software for searching, downloading, verifying, and updating Android apps from an F-Droid repository
- fdroidserver – tool for managing existing repositories and creating new ones
- Jekyll-based website generator for a repository

F-Droid builds apps from publicly available and freely licensed source code; new apps, which must be free of proprietary software, are contributed by user submissions or the developers themselves. F-Droid tries to check the source code and remove issues, but warns that the checking is not exhaustive. Many app stores, such as Google Play and Apple's App Store, screen apps mostly using automated tools only; malware with defeat devices can pass these tests, by detecting when the software is being automatically tested and delaying malicious activity.

The project describes itself as having a core of volunteers; some contributors have been paid for their work.

== Client application ==
"Get it on F-Droid" badge

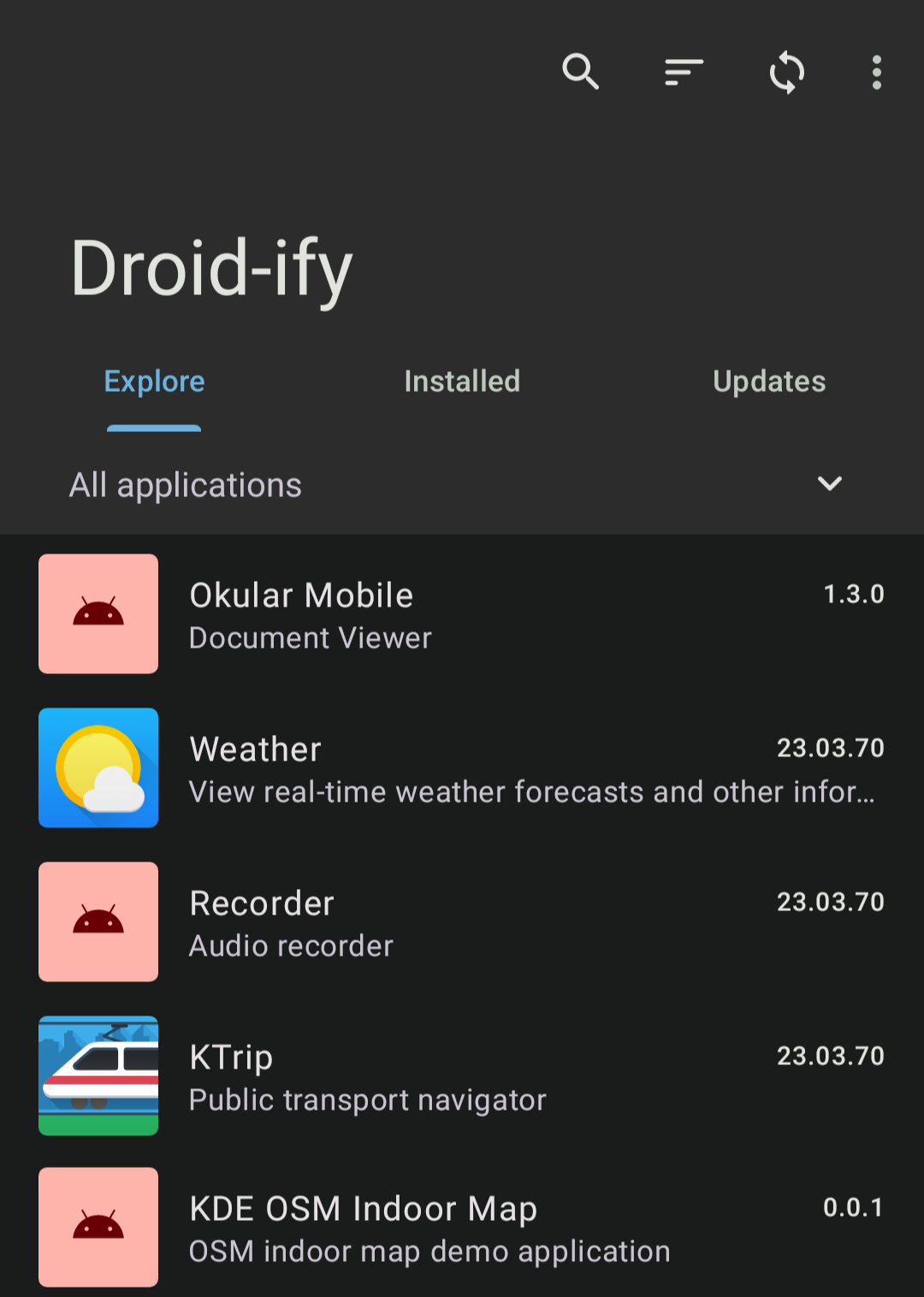
Droid-ify is a F-Droid client with Material UI focused on user experience. It is an alternative to the official F-Droid client, also using the F-Droid app repository.

F-Droid is not available on the Google Play Store. To install the F-Droid client, users must allow installation from "Unknown sources" in Android settings and retrieve the F-Droid Android application package (.apk file) from the official site.

The client was designed to be resilient against surveillance, censorship, and unreliable Internet connections. To promote anonymity, it supports HTTP proxies and repositories hosted on Tor onion services. Client devices can function as impromptu "app stores", distributing downloaded apps to other devices over local Wi-Fi and Bluetooth. The F-Droid client app automatically offers updates for installed F-Droid apps; when the F-Droid Privileged Extension is installed, updates can also be installed by the app itself in the background. However, automatic updates are not turned on by default. The extension requires the device to have root access, or to be able to flash a zip file.

Besides the original F-Droid app, there are also alternative clients, such as Droid-ify or NeoStore, that are alternative front-end clients to the F-Droid repositories.

== Key management ==
The Android operating system checks that updates are signed with the same key, preventing others from distributing updates that are signed by a different key. Originally, the Google Play store required applications to be signed by the developer of the application, while F-Droid only allowed its own signing keys. So apps previously installed from another source have to be reinstalled to receive updates.

In September 2017, Google Play started offering developers a signing key service managed by Google Play, offering a similar service to what F-Droid offered since 2011, and F-Droid now lets developers use their own keys via the reproducible build process.

== Security issues ==
In 2012, F-Droid announced they had removed an app because of a security flaw that could leak personal information. In 2017, F-Droid stated "No malware has been found in f-droid.org in its 7 years of operation." In 2022, F-Droid discovered over 20 distributed applications contained "known vulnerabilities".

== Reception ==
In August 2019, Rae Hodge of CNET recommended F-Droid as a way to avoid malware from Google apps, which according to Google was a low risk. Advantages of F-Droid were said to include better security odds of open source software, avoidance of tracking in apps and a "stringent security auditing process", no hidden costs, and greater customization. Disadvantages were said to be lack of a rating system, only about 2,600 apps in F-Droid, versus more than 2.5 million in the Play store, and more manual process for updating apps. Editors cautioned F-Droid can give users more control and better privacy and security, but also takes more diligence.

In an April 2022 detailed article for HowtoGeek, Joe Fedewa wrote "The selection of apps is much smaller in F-Droid than the Play Store, around 3,000 compared to around 3 million, but that's to be expected. If you're looking to de-Google your life a bit, or you just want to try some apps that have better ethics, F-Droid is a great place to go."

In a December 2022 detailed article in Popular Science, Justin Pot wrote "F-Droid isn't going to replace Google Play for most people, but it's a nice and simple alternative for finding free and safe apps before you dive into the swamp that is Google's app store."

== See also ==
- Digital distribution
- Kali NetHunter
- List of Android app stores
- List of mobile app distribution platforms
- List of mobile device management software
- Mobile app
- Synaptic (software)
