= Google Allo =

Instant messaging app by Google

- Screenshot A screenshot of Allo, showing the "smart reply" feature
- Developer: Google
- Release: September 21, 2016; 10 years ago

Final release(s) [±]
- Android: 27.0.326_RC03 / December 7, 2018; 7 years ago
- iOS: 27.0 / December 5, 2018; 7 years ago
- Operating system: Android; iOS; Web browser
- Successor: Google Messages
- Available in: 10 languages
- List of languages English, French, German, Hindi, Indonesian, Italian, Japanese, Korean, Portuguese, Spanish
- Type: Instant messaging
- License: Proprietary
- Website: allo.google.com (redirects to Google Messages on the android website)

Google Allo was an instant messaging mobile app by Google for the Android and iOS mobile operating systems, with a web client available in some web browsers. It closed on March 12, 2019.

The app used phone numbers as identifiers, allowing users to exchange messages, files, voice notes, and images. It included a virtual assistant that generated automatic reply suggestions and an optional encrypted mode known as incognito mode. Users could also resize messages and add doodles and stickers on images before sending them.

Before launch, Google touted strong privacy in the app, with particular emphasis on messages stored "transiently and in non-identifiable form". However, at launch, privacy was significantly rolled back, with Google keeping logs of messages indefinitely (or until the user deletes messages) in an effort to improve the app's "smart reply" feature.

== History ==
Allo was announced at Google's developer conference on May 18, 2016. At the time, Google said that it would release Allo in summer 2016, and they launched it on September 21, 2016. During the unveiling of Google's Pixel smartphone in October 2016, it announced that Allo would be pre-installed on the Pixel phones, along with its sister app, Google Duo. In February 2017, a tweet by Google's Vice President of Communications Nick Fox showed a screenshot of Allo running as a web app, along with the words: "Still in early development, but coming to a desktop near you..." A further tweet from Fox in May stated that the web client was "a month or two from public release."

In August, Google Allo for web went live for Android users using Google Chrome, while Firefox, Opera and iOS support was rolled out in October.

In April 2018, it was reported that Google would be "pausing" development of Allo. Anil Sabharwal, the new head of the communications group at Google, stated that its employees would work primarily on its implementation of the carrier-based Rich Communication Services (RCS) Universal Profile, under the branding "Chat". This was implemented within the Android Messages app used for SMS.

In December 2018, Google announced they would end support for Allo in March 2019. A final update to the app allowed users to export chat messages from Allo. The Allo service shut down completely on March 14, 2019, with its homepage recommending users to try Google's Messages app as an alternative.

== Features ==
The Whisper Shout feature being demonstrated at Google I/O 2016

Allo was based on phone numbers, not by social media or email accounts. Allo's "Smart reply" feature used Google's machine learning technology to suggest a reply to the last message, which could be selected from a few options. The feature also analyzed images sent to the user in order to suggest responses. Similar to the smart reply feature seen in Google's Inbox app, it learnt from the user's behavior to adapt its suggestions over time. Allo was one of the apps that supported Google Assistant, a virtual assistant that allows users to ask questions and receive answers in a two-way conversational nature. Additional features include "Whisper Shout", which allows the user to increase or decrease the size of a message to represent volume, and the ability to draw on photos before sending them.

In November 2016, Google introduced Smart Smiley, a feature that suggested emojis and stickers depending on the mood of the message. Smart Smiley also showed suggestions when starting a new conversation. In addition, background themes for chats were added at the same time.

In March 2017, a GIF library was added in the compose bar, as well as easier one-tap access to the Google Assistant, and animated emoji. Also in March was an update that let Android users send various types of files, including PDFs, documents, APKs, ZIP archives, and MP3 tracks through Allo. In May, the app was updated to allow users to backup and restore chats, it added an Incognito mode for group chats, and introduced previews for links. Later the same month, Fast Company reported that Google updated Allo to add cartoon stickers on selfie photos, powered by artificial intelligence technology capable of producing "563 quadrillion face" animations. Complementing selfie stickers, Google also launched "selfie clips", short looped videos of the user's face. In June, the ability to make Google Duo video or audio calls directly from Allo chats was included. The following month saw message reactions being added, where users could tap on a heart below messages received. An in-chat translation feature appeared to some users in version 17 and rolled out to all in version 18, the latter of which was released in September. Group chat controls, which could be switched on for new group chats, were added in November 2017. In version 25, automatic transcriptions for audio messages appeared, though this could be disabled in settings.

=== Incognito mode ===
Incognito mode was an optional mode that included expiring chats, private notifications, and end-to-end encryption. For encryption, the app used the Signal Protocol. Incognito mode did not include any Smart Reply or Google Assistant features. When the user received a sticker from a sticker pack that they did not already have installed on their device, the app retrieved the sticker from Google's servers using security, but not end-to-end encryption.

== Reception ==
=== Virtual assistant ===
PC World's Mark Hachman gave a favorable review of Allo's virtual assistant, saying that it was a "step up on Cortana and Siri".

=== Optional encryption ===
Following Allo's introduction at Google I/O, Google was criticized by security experts and privacy advocates for having the end-to-end encryption turned off by default, which they argue leaves the app open to government surveillance. Edward Snowden, whistleblower and former NSA contractor, criticized the app on Twitter, saying that "Google's decision to disable end-to-end encryption by default in its new #Allo chat app is dangerous, and makes it unsafe."

Thai Duong, a co-lead of Google's product security team, wrote in a personal blog post that he would push for the addition of a setting that would let users have the encryption on all the time. However, he later retracted the statement.

=== Message retention ===
When Allo was first introduced, its developers talked about storing non-incognito messages only "transiently and in non-identifiable form". At launch, Google revealed that they would instead store all non-incognito messages indefinitely (or until the user deleted them) in order to improve the built-in "smart reply" feature. Russell Brandom of The Verge commented that "the decision will have significant consequences for law enforcement access to Allo messages. By default, Allo messages will now be accessible to lawful warrant requests, the same as message data in Gmail and Hangouts".

=== Other privacy issues ===
Reports surfaced in March 2017 that a bug with the Google Assistant in the Allo app would accidentally share results in a conversation from an individual's search history, despite the search not being previously mentioned by the other chat participant or previously in the conversation. Google acknowledged the issue, and stated that it had been fixed.

== See also ==
- Comparison of cross-platform instant messaging clients
- Messages (Google)
- Google Duo
- Google Hangouts
- Google Chat
- Google Spaces
