= Google Labs =

Google experimental services

Labs
- Icon
- Project type: Experiment
- Funding agency: Google
- Duration: 2006; 20 years ago –
- Website: labs.google

Google Labs is an experimental technology initiative developed by Google to create, test, and publicly demonstrate new products and features. Originally launched in 2002, Google Labs served as a platform for early-stage experiments and hosted preview versions of products such as Gmail, Google Calendar, and Google Wave. The original service was discontinued in 2011 before the Labs branding was revived in the 2020s for experimental artificial intelligence and emerging technology projects.

Google described Labs as "a playground where our more adventurous users can play around with prototypes of some of our wild and crazy ideas and offer feedback directly to the engineers who developed them."

In 2023, Google revived Labs during the annual Google I/O keynote as part of the company's broader expansion into generative artificial intelligence products and experiments.

Former icon used prior to 2011

== History ==
Former Google Labs logo

Google Labs was launched in 2002 as a platform for experimental Google products and features. The initiative became associated with Google's engineering culture and public beta testing model during the 2000s. Several Google products, including Gmail, Google Calendar, and Google Wave, were initially released through Labs or maintained experimental "Labs" features prior to wider public release.

In 2006, Google standardized the branding of Labs products with a flask icon and gray title styling, distinguishing them from Google's main color-coded services such as Google News and Google Maps.

Google also used invitation-only access for some Labs products and experiments, particularly during the early development of Gmail and Google Calendar.

=== Discontinuation ===
In July 2011, Google announced that it would discontinue Google Labs as part of a broader effort to prioritize fewer products and streamline development.

Although many of the experiments have been discontinued, a few have moved to the main search pages or have been integrated into other products. Google still has many links to its defunct "Labs" tools in Google blogs that are readily accessible through a Google search.

=== Revival ===
In November 2021, Google revived the Labs branding internally for a division encompassing the company's augmented reality and virtual reality projects, including Area 120 and Project Starline.

In 2023, Google publicly relaunched Google Labs as a platform focused primarily on experimental generative artificial intelligence tools and services introduced during Google I/O. Upon launch, they released several experiments, such as Project IDX, Google Home's Help Me Script, NotebookLM (now Gemini Notebook, and MusicLM (now MusicFX). As of 2026, Google Labs hosts experimental AI products such as Gemini Notebook (formerly NotebookLM), Veo, Google Stitch, and Search Labs, an experimental AI-assisted version of Google Search.

== Selected products ==
Project	Description
Gemini Notebook	An AI-assisted research and note-taking tool powered by Google Gemini.
Jules	An experimental AI coding assistant designed to automate software development tasks within GitHub workflows.
Flow	An AI filmmaking and video generation tool using Google's generative AI models, including Veo.
Opal	A no-code application development platform for building AI-powered applications.
Stitch	A software design tool that converts prompts, sketches, and screenshots into editable user interface designs and front-end code.
Google Flow Music	An AI music generation platform formerly known as ProducerAI.
