= Google I/O =

Annual developer conference held by Google

- Date: May–June (1–3 days)
- Frequency: Annual
- Venue: Various
- Location: Various
- Founded: May 28, 2008
- Most recent: May 19, 2026
- Attendance: 5,000
- Organizer: Google
- Website: io.google

Google I/O is an annual developer conference held by Google since 2007 in Mountain View, California. "I/O" stands for input/output. The annual conference started as "Google Developer Day" a year prior.

== History ==
The first conference, in 2007, was called "Google Developer Day" and was hosted at the San Jose Convention Center, with 1,000 tickets for developers. Since 2008, the conference has been called Google I/O.

== Key announcements and milestones ==
- 2008: Launch of the Android platform, the Open Handset Alliance, and introduction of various APIs for Google Maps and YouTube.
- 2009: Introduction of the Google Wave communication platform.
- 2010: Announcement of Android 2.2 Froyo, Google TV, and the App Inventor for Android.
- 2011: Unveiling of Android 3.1 Honeycomb, Google Music Beta, and the Android Open Accessory API.
- 2012: Introduction of Android 4.1 Jelly Bean, Nexus 7 tablet, Nexus Q, and Project Glass demonstrations.
- 2013: Launch of Google Play Music All Access, Google Hangouts, and enhancements to Google Maps.
- 2014: Announcement of Android 5.0 Lollipop, Material Design, Android Auto, Android TV, and Android Wear.
- 2015: Introduction of Android 6.0 Marshmallow, Google Photos, and Project Brillo for IoT.
- 2016: Launch of Google Assistant, Google Home, Allo and Duo apps, and Android Instant Apps.
- 2017: Announcement of Google Lens, Android Oreo, and Google AI for AI research initiatives.
- 2018: Introduction of Android P (later named Android Pie), Google Duplex, and further enhancements to Google Assistant and Google News.
- 2019: Launch of the Pixel 3a and 3a XL, updates to Google Assistant, and the introduction of Project Mainline for Android updates.
- 2020: Cancelled due to the COVID-19 pandemic.
- 2021: A virtual event with the announcement of Android 12 with Material You design, enhancements to Wear OS, and Project Starline for video conferencing.
- 2022: Updates to Google's AI and machine learning capabilities, introduction of new privacy controls, enhancements to Google Workspace, and various updates to Android and Wear OS.
- 2023: Focus on Generative AI (PaLM 2) for core products, introduction of Pixel Fold (first foldable phone), Pixel 7a (most durable A-Series phone), and Pixel Tablet.
- 2024: New iteration of Gemini AI and Firebase Genkit, a framework for creating and deploying applications with AI features. SGE or Search Generative Experience rebranded as AI Overviews.
- 2025: Launch of AI Mode for Search, and the coding agent Jules. Introduces Veo 3, an update to their video generation model with corresponding audio. Google also revealed its Gemini Pro Ultra Plan.
- 2026: Announced Gemini 3.5 Flash and Gemini Omni, Gemini Spark, Search Agents and Generative UI as a major overhaul to Google Search. AI-powered Audio Glasses in partnership with Samsung, Warby Parker, and Gentle Monster slated for fall 2026.

== Highlights ==
=== 2008 ===
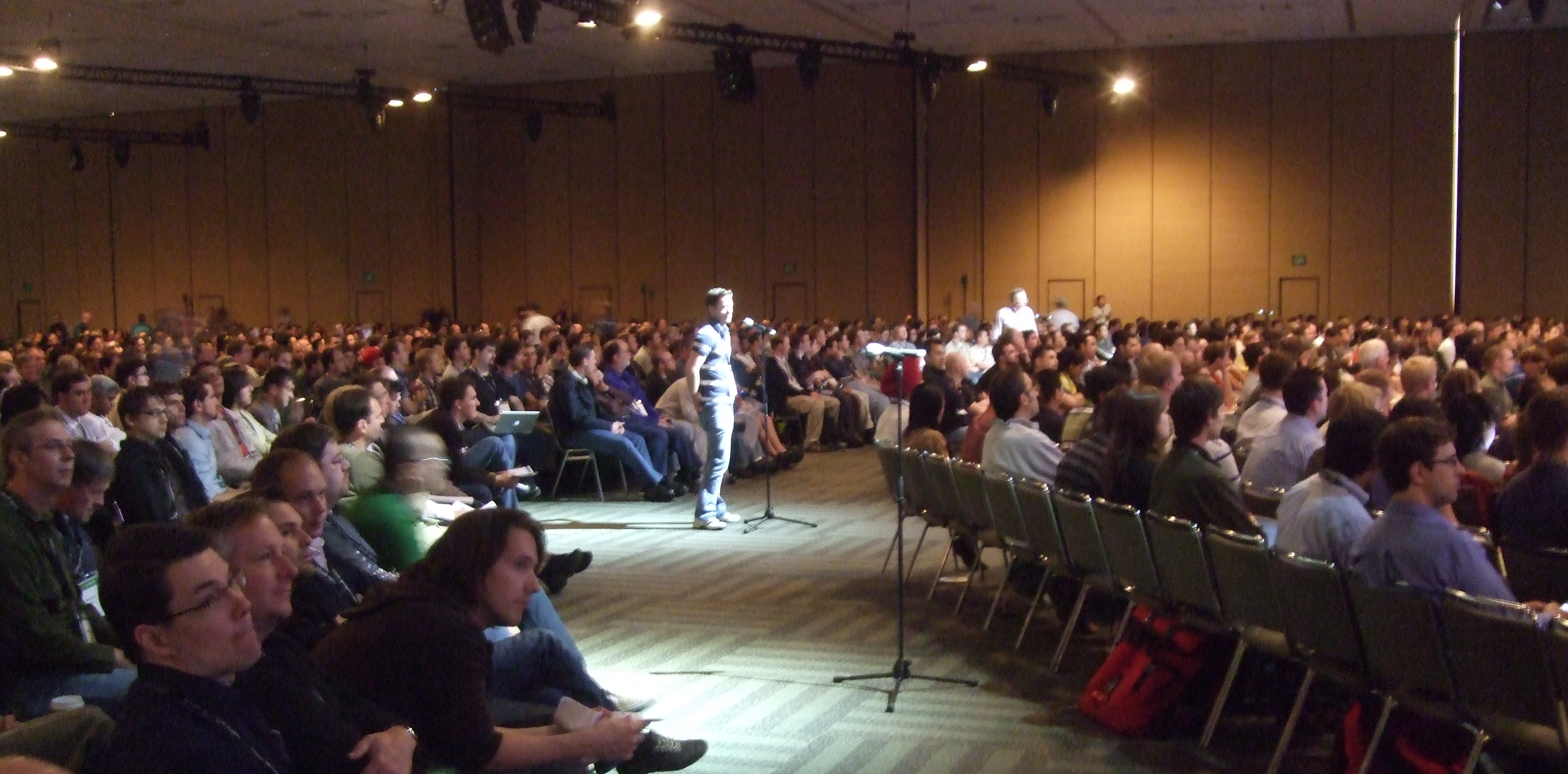
Google I/O in 2008

The first I/O event with major topics included:

- Android
- App Engine
- Bionic
- Maps API
- OpenSocial
- Web Toolkit

Speakers included Marissa Mayer, David Glazer, Steve Horowitz, Alex Martelli, Steve Souders, Dion Almaer, Mark Lucovsky, Guido van Rossum, Jeff Dean, Chris DiBona, Josh Bloch, Raffaello D'Andrea, and Geoff Stearns.

=== 2009 ===
Major topics included:

- AJAX APIs
- Android
- App Engine
- Chrome
- OpenSocial
- Wave
- Web Toolkit

Speakers included Aaron Boodman, Adam Feldman, Adam Schuck, Alex Moffat, Alon Levi, Andrew Bowers, Andrew Hatton, Anil Sabharwal, Arne Roomann-Kurrik, Ben Collins-Sussman, Jacob Lee, Jeff Fisher, Jeff Ragusa, Jeff Sharkey, Jeffrey Sambells, Jerome Mouton and Jesse Kocher.

Attendees were given a HTC Magic.

=== 2010 ===
Major topics included:

- APIs
- Android
- App Engine
- Chrome
- Enterprise
- Geo
- OpenSocial
- Social Web
- TV
- Wave

Speakers included Aaron Koblin, Adam Graff, Adam Nash, Adam Powell, Adam Schuck, Alan Green, Albert Cheng, Albert Wenger, Alex Russell, Alfred Fuller, Amit Agarwal, Amit Kulkarni, Amit Manjhi, Amit Weinstein, Andres Sandholm, Angus Logan, Arne Roomann-Kurrik, Bart N. Locanthi, Ben Appleton, Ben Chang, Ben Collins-Sussman.

Attendees were given a HTC Evo 4G at the event. Prior to the event US attendees received a Motorola Droid while non-US attendees received a Nexus One.

=== 2011 ===
Major topics included:

- Android
  - Google Play Music
  - Google Play Movies
  - Honeycomb (3.1)
  - Ice Cream Sandwich
- Chrome and Chrome OS
  - Chromebooks from Acer and Samsung
  - Angry Birds for Chrome
  - In-app purchases for Chrome Web Store

Attendees were given a Samsung Galaxy Tab 10.1, Series 5 Chromebook and Verizon MiFi.

The after party was hosted by Jane's Addiction.

=== 2012 ===
The I/O conference was extended from the usual two-day schedule to three days. There was no keynote on the final day. Attendees were given a Galaxy Nexus, Nexus 7, Nexus Q and Chromebox. The after party was hosted by Paul Oakenfold and Train.

Major topics included:

- Android
  - 3D imagery for Earth
  - 400 million users announcement
  - Analytics
  - Google Now
  - Jelly Bean
  - In-app purchases for Wallet
  - Project Butter
- Chrome
  - 310 million users announcement
  - Chrome for Android is stable
  - iOS app
- Compute Engine
- Docs
  - Offline editing
- Drive
  - App for iOS
  - SDK (v.2)
- Glass
- Gmail
  - 425 million users announcement
- Google+
  - Hangouts app and metrics
  - Platform for Mobile with SDKs and APIs
- Maps
  - Offline for Android
  - Enhanced maps in API
  - Transit data in API
- Nexus
  - 7
  - Q
- YouTube
  - Updated 720p HD API
  - Heat maps and symbols in API
  - Updated Android app

=== 2013 ===
Google I/O 2013 was held at the Moscone Center, San Francisco. The amount of time for all the $900 (or $300 for school students and faculty) tickets to sell out was 49 minutes, even when registrants had both Google+ and Wallet accounts by requirement. A fleet of remote-controlled blimps streamed a bird's-eye view of the event. Attendees were given a Chromebook Pixel. The after party was hosted by Billy Idol and Steve Aoki .

Major topics included:

- Android
  - 900 million users announcement
  - Updated Search
  - Studio
- App Engine
  - PHP support
- Google+
  - Redesign with photo and sharing emphasis
- Hangouts
  - Updated IM platform
- Maps
  - Redesign on web and Android
- Play
  - Games
  - Music All Access
  - Play for Education
  - Samsung Galaxy S4 to be sold
  - Updated Google Play Services
- TV
  - Update to Jelly Bean

=== 2014 ===
Major topics included:

- Android
  - Auto
  - Lollipop
  - Material Design
  - One
  - Slides
  - TV
  - Wear
- Chromebook
  - Improvements
- Google Fit
- Gmail
  - API

Attendees were given a LG G Watch or Samsung Gear Live, Google Cardboard, and a Moto 360 was shipped to attendees after the event.

=== 2015 ===
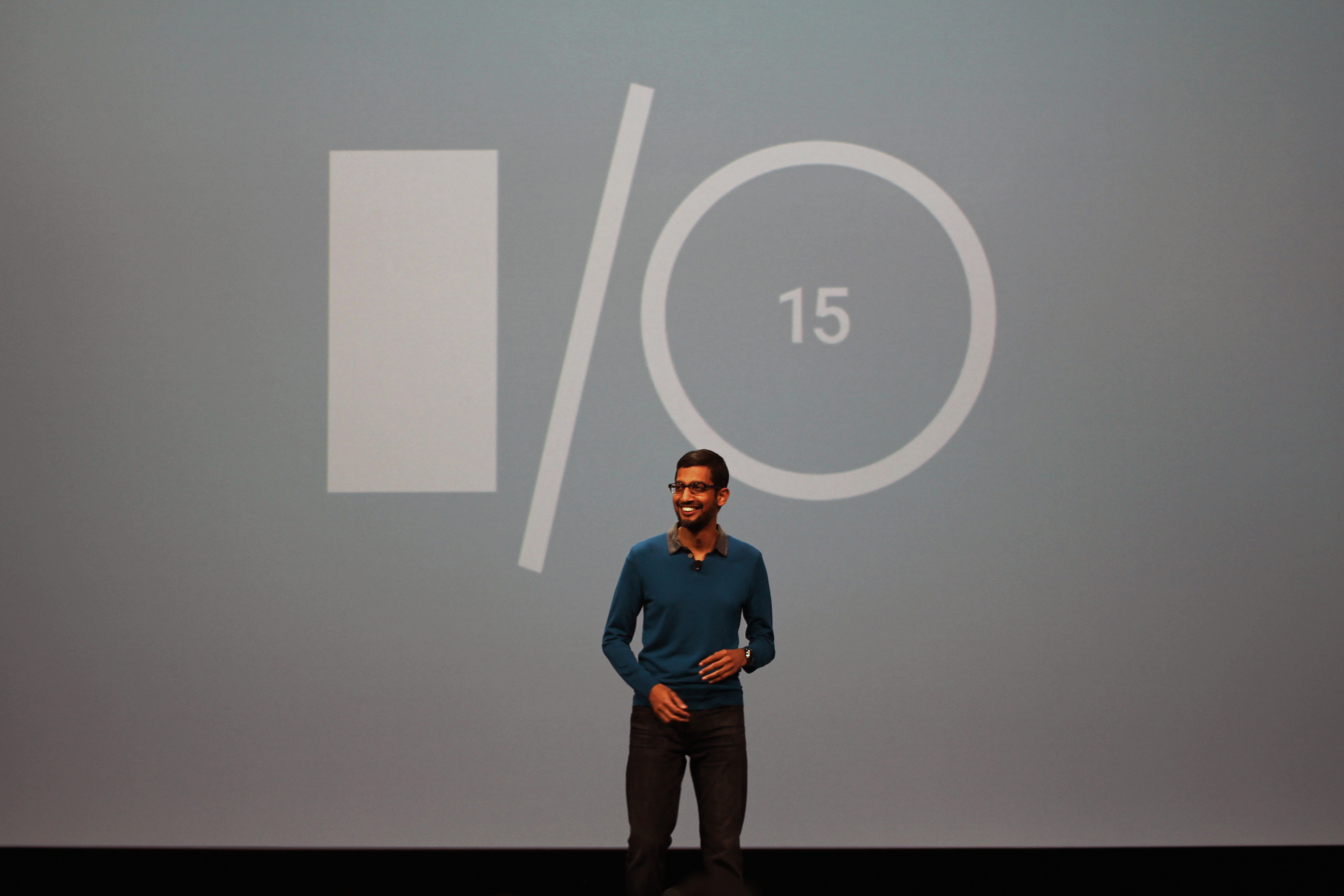
Sundar Pichai at Google I/O 2015

Major topics included:

- Android Marshmallow
  - App permission controls
  - Native fingerprint recognition
  - "Deep sleep", a mode which puts the device to sleep for power saving
  - USB-C support
  - Deep-linking app support, which leads verified app URLs to the app in the Play store.
- Android Pay
- Android Wear
  - "Always on" extension to apps
  - Wrist gestures
- Chrome
- Custom tabs Gmail
  - Inbox availability for everyone
- Maps
  - Offline mode
- Nanodegree, an Android course on Udacity
- Now
  - Reduction in voice error
  - Context improvements
- Photos
- Play
  - "About" tabs for developer pages
  - A/B listings
  - Store listing experiments
  - "Family Star" badge
- Project Brillo, a new operating system for the Android-based Internet of things.
  - Project Weave, a common language for IoT devices to communicate.

Attendees were given an Nexus 9 tablet and an improved version of Google Cardboard

=== 2016 ===
Sundar Pichai moved Google I/O to Shoreline Amphitheatre in Mountain View, CA for the first time. Attendees were given sunglasses and sunscreen due to the amphitheater's outside conditions, however many attendees were sunburned so the talks were relatively short. There was no hardware giveaway.

Major topics included:

- Allo
- Android
  - Daydream, Android support for VR was shown with Daydream.
  - Instant Apps, a code path that downloads a part of an app instead of accessing a web app, which allows links to load apps on-demand without installation. This was shown with the B&H app.
  - Nougat
  - Wear 2.0
  - The inaugural Google Play Awards were presented to the year's best apps and games in ten categories.
- Assistant
- Duo
- Firebase, a mobile application platform, now adds storage, reporting and analytics.
- Home
- Play integration with Chrome OS

=== 2017 ===
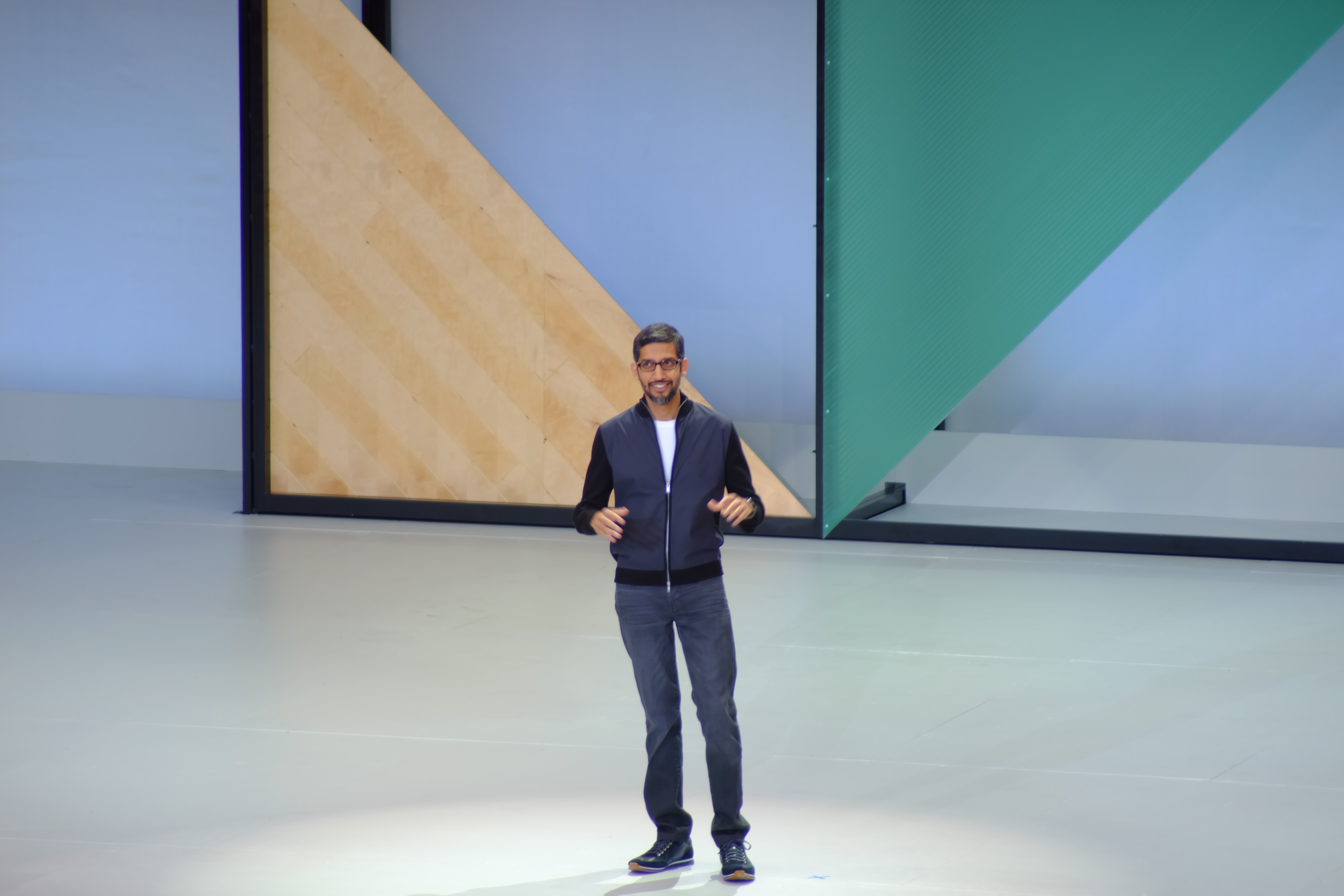
Sundar Pichai at the Google I/O 2017 Keynote

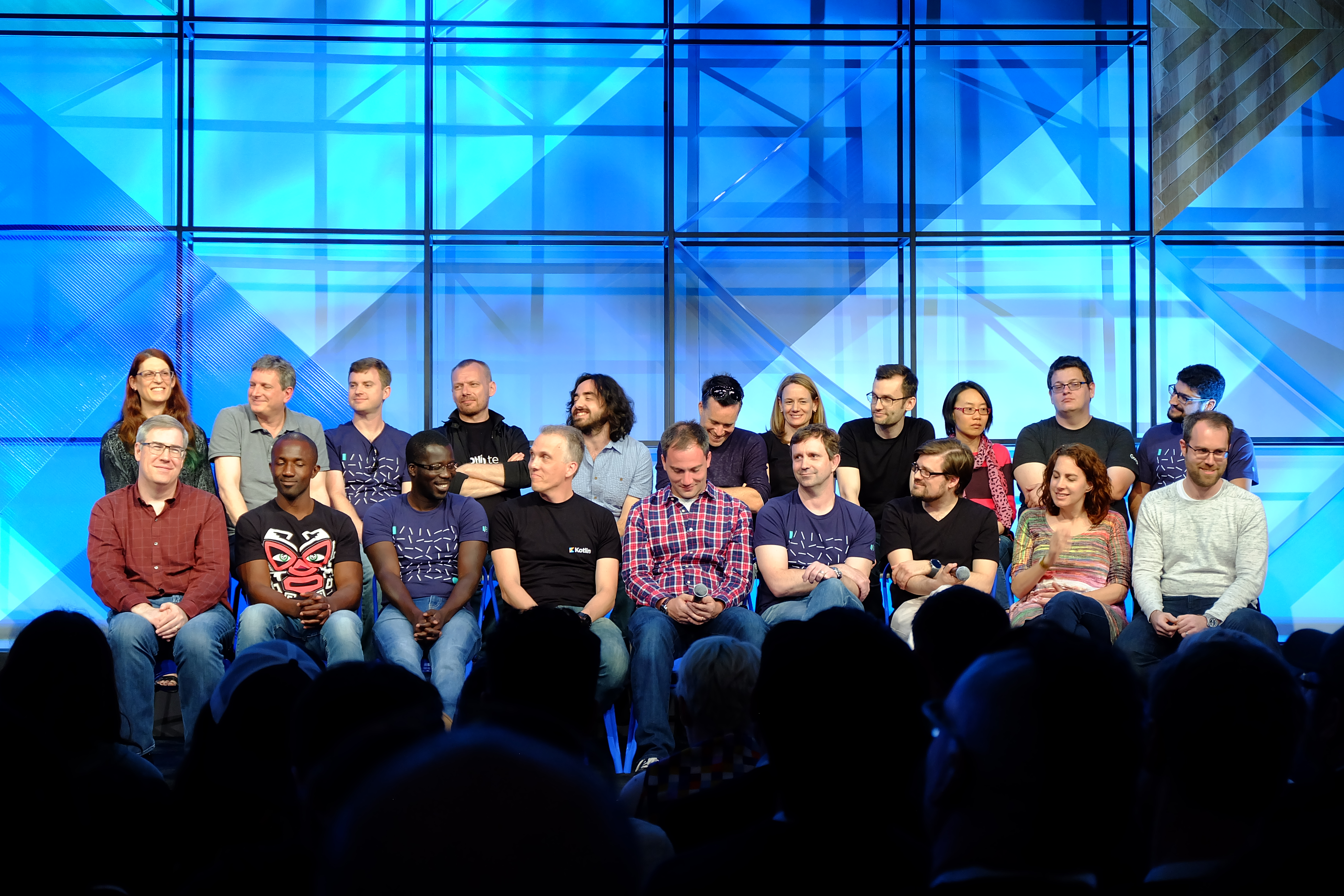
Google I/O 2017 Android Fireside Chat

Major topics included:

- Android Oreo
  - Project Treble, an Android Oreo feature that modularizes the OS so carriers can update their smartphones easier.
- Flutter, a cross-platform mobile development framework that enables fast development of apps across iOS and Android.
- Google.ai
  - Google Lens
  - Google Assistant became available on iOS devices.
  - A new standalone (in-built) virtual reality system to be made by the HTC Vive team and Lenovo.

Attendees were given a Google Home and $700 in Google Cloud Platform Credits. The afterparty was hosted by LCD Soundsystem.

=== 2018 ===
Major topics included:

- Android Pie
- Digital Wellbeing initiatives
- Material Design 2.0
- Changes in Gmail
- Android Wear 3.0
- An Impressive Google Assistant
- AR/VR efforts
- Updated Google Home

Attendees were given an Android Things kit and a Google Home Mini. The after party was hosted by Justice with Phantogram opening.

=== 2019 ===
Major topics included:

- Android Q Beta 3
- Pixel 3a and 3a XL
- Flutter on web
- Google Lens
- Firebase
- AR walking directions in Google Maps
- Offline, streamlined Google Assistant
- Assistant driving mode
- Kotlin-First Development
- Rebranding of Google Home devices to Google Nest
- Live Caption
- Project Mainline (streamlined OS update process on Android Q)
- Google Duplex web API

The after party was hosted by The Flaming Lips. There was no hardware giveaway.

=== 2020 ===
The 2020 event was originally scheduled to be held for May 12–14, but due to the COVID-19 pandemic, the event was considered for alternative formats and Google announced that the event would be eventually cancelled.

=== 2021 ===
The 2021 event was held from May 18–20 and due to the COVID-19 protocols, the event was held as a virtual event with a limited attended audience. Major topics included: Android 12 with the Material You design, new enhancements to Wear OS, and Project Starline for video conferencing.

=== 2022 ===
The 2022 event marked the full audience capacity since the 2019 I/O event held from May 11–12. Major topics included the Updates to Google's AI and machine learning capabilities, the introduction of new privacy controls, enhancements to Google Workspace, various updates to Android and Wear OS, new hardware products with the new Google Pixel 6a, Google Pixel Tablet, Google Pixel Buds Pro, the Google Pixel Watch, and the preview of the Google Pixel 7.

=== 2023 ===
The event in 2023 was held from May 10–11. Major topics that were announced and included were the focus on Generative AI (PaLM 2) for core products, introduction of the Pixel Fold (The first foldable phone by Google), the Pixel 7a (most durable A-Series phone), and the release date and specs for the Pixel Tablet.

=== 2024 ===
The 2024 event held from May 13–14 announced the new iteration of Gemini AI and Firebase Genkit, a framework for creating and deploying applications with AI features. SGE or Search Generative Experience rebranded as AI Overviews, and the Google Pixel 8a.

=== 2025 ===
The event in 2025 held from May 20–21 saw the announcements of the Launch of AI Mode for Search, the coding agent Jules, the introduction of Veo 3, and an update to their video generation model with corresponding audio. Google also revealed its Gemini Pro Ultra Plan.

=== 2026 ===
The 2026 event from May 19-20 announced Gemini 3.5 Flash and Gemini Omni, Gemini Spark, Search Agents and Generative UI as a major overhaul to Google Search, Antigravity 2.0, the Universal Commerce Protocol for agent-driven shopping, and AI-powered Audio Glasses in partnership with Samsung, Warby Parker, and Gentle Monster slated for fall 2026.
