= Vopium =

- Type: Public
- Traded as: Euronext: MLVOP
- Industry: Telecommunications
- Founded: 2006
- Headquarters: Copenhagen, Denmark
- Key people: Tanveer Sharif, CEO & Co-Founder; Asadullah Parvaiz, CTO; Jonas Holm, CFO
- Number of employees: 100
- Website: www.vopium.com

Vopium is a software-based provider of free and low-cost international mobile communication via VoIP and Wi-Fi technology, based on a free but closed source client application.

It supports many protocols: SIP, MSN, Skype, Yahoo, AOL, ICQ, Google Talk, Facebook, and Twitter.

In February 2010, Vopium's VoIP and messaging solution was launched as a white label and in March 2010 Vopium partnered with Convergia Networks Inc. Vopium has over the past years enabled several white label partners, among others Ooredoo Tunesia ("Link"), Telenor ("Comoyo"), TalkTalk ("Talk2Go") and Mobilink ("Mobilink Word"). None of these are currently operational.

In June 2010, Vopium has expanded its group of owners to include the international telecommunications investor Raghuvinder Kataria who invested $16.5M.
