= Google Beam =

Experimental video conferencing method by Google

Google Beam, known as Project Starline in developmental stages, is a video communication method developed by Google that allows the user to see a 3D model of the person they are communicating with. Google announced the product at its 2021 I/O developer conference, saying that it will allow users to "talk naturally, gesture and make eye contact" by utilizing machine learning, spatial audio, computer vision and real-time compression to create the 3D effect without the user wearing typical virtual reality goggles. The goal is to make the user feel as if they are in the same room with the other user.

== Development ==
Project Starline had been in development for more than five years prior to the official announcement on May 18, 2021. The technology is currently only available in a small number of Google's offices, but the company plans to begin collaborating with certain partners in the next year, particularly partners in the healthcare and media industries.

In November 2021, the project was reorganized under a new division called Google Labs (unrelated to the defunct service of the same name) along with Area 120 and Google's AR and VR efforts. Google will begin testing the technology with corporations such as Salesforce and T-Mobile beginning in late 2022. In May 2024, Google stated that it was working on integrating Project Starline technology into videoconferencing apps such as Google Meet and Zoom, announcing a partnership with HP.

The HP Dimension, to be released in 2025 for US$24,999, is the first commercial version of Google Beam.

== Booth ==
The current implementation of Project Starline is a booth that the user sits in, facing a 65 in (170 cm) "light field display", surrounded by depth sensors, cameras, and lights. Light field technology is a photography technique that captures the direction of light as well as its intensity and color to enable more effective 3D imaging. The user can then view another user on the display in 3D and vice versa. Google says it plans to "make this technology more affordable and accessible."

== Reception ==
Jay Peters of The Verge was impressed by a demo of Project Starline, comparing it to "real life science fiction".
