= Google Chat =

Enterprise messaging software developed by Google

- Screenshot of the Google Chat website
- Developer: Google
- Release: March 9, 2017; 9 years ago

Stable release(s) [±]
- Android: 2026.10.19 (Build 1005077904) / October 23, 2026; 6 days ago
- iOS (Note: Including iPadOS): 1.0.494 / October 27, 2026; 2 days ago
- Operating system: Android 7+; iOS 18+; web; Discontinued: Android 6, iOS 16, 17 (2026); iOS 15 (2024); iOS 14 (2023); iOS 12, 13 (2022); Android 5 (2021)
- Predecessor: Google Hangouts
- Type: Communication software
- License: Freeware
- Website: mail.google.com/chat
- Repository: github.com/googleworkspace

Google Chat is a communication service developed by Google. Initially designed for teams and business environments, it has since been made available for general consumers. It provides direct messaging, group conversations, and spaces, which allow users to create and assign tasks and share files in a central place in addition to chatting. It is a component of Google Workspace. It can be accessed through its own website and app or through the Gmail website and app.

It was first launched as Hangouts Chat on March 9, 2017, as one of the two apps to constitute the replacement for Google Hangouts, the other being Google Meet. It was renamed to Google Chat on April 9, 2020. It was initially only available for the Google Workspace software suite, but in February 2021 Google began rolling out Google Chat in "early access" to regular consumer accounts until it became fully available in April 2021. Google deprecated the original Hangouts and replaced it with Chat on November 1, 2022.

== History ==
Google Chat was first launched as Hangouts Chat on March 9, 2017, for Google Workspace (called G Suite until October 2020) customers only as a replacement for Google Hangouts. All G Suite packages had identical features except for a lack of Vault data retention in the Basic package.

On April 9, 2020, Google rebranded Hangouts Chat to Google Chat. Following this rebranding, and along with a similar change for Hangouts Meet, the Hangouts brand was removed from Google Workspace.

=== Migration from Hangouts ===
Google first announced their plan to begin retiring Google Hangouts in October 2019. In October 2020, Google announced that it would open Google Chat up to consumers in 2021. Google also announced that Hangouts conversations, contacts, and history would be migrated over to Google Chat.

Google Chat began to roll out to consumer accounts in "early access" in February 2021, but at the time Google stated that Hangouts would remain a consumer-level product for people using standard Google accounts. By April 2021, Google Chat became fully available for free as an "early access" service, for users who choose to use it instead of Hangouts.

In August 2021, Google started automatically signing out Google Hangouts users on iOS and Android and notifying them to switch to Google Chat.

Google planned to deprecate Google Hangouts and replace it with Google Chat in early 2022. In February 2022, Google announced plans to begin the final migration of all Google Workspace customers from Google Hangouts to Google Chat, which was scheduled to be finalized in May 2022. In September 2022, Google announced all Hangouts data would be deleted by January 1, 2023.

=== Redesign ===
The updated UI of the Google Chat app for Android

In December 2023, Google began to roll out a version of Google Chat with a redesigned sidebar and updated the logo. These changes made Google Chat more productive and integrated artificial intelligence into the service.

=== Logo history ===
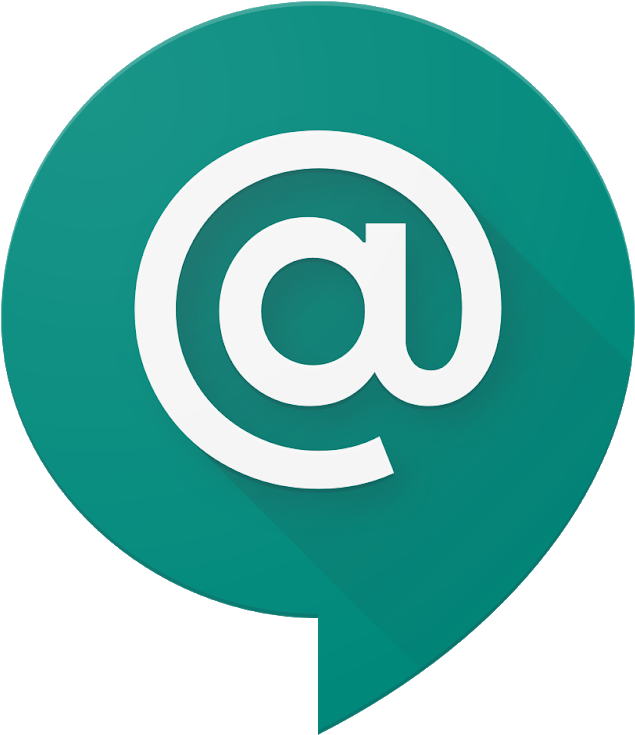
First Chat logo (2017–2020)

Second Chat logo (2020–2023)

Third Chat logo (2023–2026)

Fourth and current Chat logo (2026–present)

== Features ==
A screenshot of a Google Chat conversation

Google Chat is divided into two sections, chat and spaces. The Chat section contains direct conversations with other people and group conversations. In addition to be able to access Google Chat from its website and app, Google Chat can also be accessed through its integration with the Gmail website and app.

In May 2022, Google announced that Chat would display banners warning users against potential phishing and malware attacks coming from personal accounts. This development for Google Chat was the latest attempt to prevent phishing and security breaches for users.

In July 2023, Google added new features to attain feature parity with other widely used instant messaging. The new chat features include: smart compose (also available in Gmail and Google Docs), editing & deleting of messages for consumer accounts (previously restricted to Google Workspace accounts only), message quoting, read receipts in group chats, text hyperlinking, hiding inactive conversations, ability to add apps from Google Workspace Marketplace for more features.

=== Spaces ===
A screenshot of a Google Chat space

Spaces, originally called Rooms, is a chat room feature built within Google Chat for topic-based collaboration, with shared files, tasks and conversations. It functions alongside Google Chat and Google Meet to integrate group productivity features like message threading and real-time collaboration to organize topic-based conversations without exiting Gmail. The feature revives the brand name previously used in a similar standalone service of the same name from 2016 to 2017, with the rebranding occurring as part of the expansion of Google Workspace to all users in 2021. Spaces are designed for collaboration on long-term projects. In contrast to spaces, group conversations only support chatting and do not have any task functionality or a separate files tab to view a list of shared files. Spaces also allow users to change the name of the chat, which is not possible with group conversations, and they allow users to only be notified when they are mentioned. Each space has three tabs, a chat tab for chatting, a files tab for sharing files, and a tasks tab for creating and assigning tasks.

The service is accessible from within Gmail alongside Chat and Meet as part of the Google Workspace expansion to all Gmail users. With the relaunch, Spaces allows up to 8,000 users to collaborate on projects and use other Workspace features such as creating Google Drive documents and Google Meet meetings from within a Space, as well as integration with Task creation and Calendar availability. At the end of 2022, the Spaces team size limit increased to 25,000. Spaces are discoverable across an organization and a Space's creator is the default manager of the space with the ability to delegate manager status to another user. The move from Rooms to Spaces also brought improvements in moderation and security features. In February 2022, Google rolled out a new Gmail interface for Workspace that was designed to better integrate Spaces as well as Chat and Meet. Spaces will gain increased functionality because Google Currents was shut down on July 5, 2023.

==== Features ====
- In-line topic threading
- Search across multiple Spaces
- Browsing within a user's organization
- File sharing
- Task assignment
- Side-by-side document and chat view
- Calendar event creation
- Online presence indicators
- Message pinning
- Custom Emoji
- Quote in reply
- Smart replies
- Message View

== See also ==
- Google Meet
- Google Talk, a defunct instant messaging service by Google active from 2005 to 2015
- Google Wave, a framework for real-time collaborative online editing, including instant messaging, from 2010 to 2012; later known as Apache Wave and discontinued in 2018.
- Google Allo, a defunct instant messaging service by Google active from 2016 to 2019
