= Google Hangouts =

2010s Google Messaging App

- Logo for Google Hangouts

- Screenshot Google Hangouts running on Android Lollipop
- Developer: Google
- Release: May 15, 2013; 13 years ago

Final release(s) [±]
- Android: 41.0.411169071 / October 29, 2022; 4 years ago
- Android (Dialer): 0.1.100944346 / September 1, 2015; 11 years ago
- Android (Meet): 33.0.268569565 / September 27, 2019; 7 years ago
- Android (Chat): 2019.09.19.271424619_prod / October 10, 2019; 7 years ago
- Android Wear: 17.0.145656208 / February 1, 2017; 9 years ago
- iOS: 41.0 / December 1, 2021; 4 years ago
- Platform: Android, iOS, Web, Wear OS
- Predecessor: Google Talk
- Successor: Google Chat; Google Duo; Google Meet
- Available in: 36 languages
- Type: Communication software
- License: Freeware
- Website: hangouts.google.com

Google Hangouts was a cross-platform instant messaging (IM) service developed by Google. It originally was a feature of Google+ in 2011, becoming a standalone product in 2013, when Google also began integrating features from Google+ Messenger and Google Talk into Hangouts. Google then began integrating features of Google Voice, its Internet telephony product, into Hangouts, stating that Hangouts was designed to be "the future" of Voice.

In 2017, Google began developing two separate enterprise communication products: Google Meet and Google Chat, as a part of its Google Workspace office suite. Google began transitioning Workspace users from Hangouts to Meet and Chat in June 2020. Subsequently, Gmail users transitioned from Hangouts to Meet and Chat during 2021, and Hangouts was discontinued on November 1, 2022.

== History ==
Prior to the launch of Hangouts, Google had maintained several similar, but technologically separate messaging services and platforms across its suite of products. These have included the enterprise-oriented Google Talk (based on XMPP), Google+ Messenger, and the Hangouts feature of Google+, which provided chat, voice, and videoconferencing features. However, its increasingly fragmented and non-unified suite of messaging offerings was also facing growing competition from services such as Facebook Messenger, iMessage, and WhatsApp. A decision was made to scrap the existing Google Talk system and code a new messaging product through a collaboration with multiple development teams.

Following reports that the new service would be known as "Babel", the service officially launched as Hangouts during the Google I/O conference on May 15, 2013.

On February 16, 2015, Google announced it would be discontinuing Google Talk and instructed users to migrate to the Hangouts app on the Chrome browser instead.

In January 2016, Google discouraged using Hangouts for SMS, recommending to instead use Google's "Messenger" SMS app (later renamed to "Messages").

In May 2016, at Google I/O 2016, Google announced two new apps: Google Allo, a messaging app with AI capabilities (AI-powered bots and selfie features) and Google Duo, a video calling app. Google's Pixel and Pixel XL smartphones released later that year were the first Google devices shipped with Duo and Allo preinstalled instead of Hangouts. Google has since confirmed that the new apps will not replace Hangouts; Hangouts will remain a separate product. In December 2018 Google announced Allo would be discontinued in March 2019 with some of its features migrated into Google Messages.

On August 15, 2016, Google announced that Hangouts on Air would be folded into YouTube Live on September 12, 2016. Some users during the date have switched to other livestream programs. Later, Hangouts on Air was discontinued on August 1, 2019.

On January 6, 2017, Google announced that the Google Hangouts API would shut down on April 25, 2017.

On March 9, 2017, Google announced that Hangouts would be targeted at business users with the Hangouts brand divided into two products: Hangouts Meet (now Google Meet) and Hangouts Chat (now Google Chat). Meet would focus on video conferences and Chat would be focused on instant messaging with additional features such as bot assistant and threaded messaging. The features would be targeted at business customers while consumer versions would use a freemium model. Google stated in December 2018 that "classic" Hangouts would be disabled by October 2019.

In November 2018, the desktop Chrome app version of Hangouts started displaying these banner messages at the top of its window: "The Hangouts Chrome app will be replaced by the Hangouts Chrome extension soon." This has generated many negative user reviews on the Chrome Web Store pages for both the Hangouts extension and the app.

In August 2019, Google announced that the G Suite version of Hangouts would be replaced by "Meet" and "Chat," and push the shut down to June 2020.

In April 2020, in response to COVID-19, Google Meet became free for all users. Also in April 2020, Google announced Hangouts will remain a consumer-level product for people using standard Google accounts.

In October 2020, Google announced that Chat would also be made free to everyone and replace "classic" Hangouts by 2021.

In April 2021, Google Chat indeed became free as an "Early Access" service, for users who choose to use it instead of Hangouts.

On June 27, 2022, Google officially announced they would be shutting down Google Hangouts on November 1, 2022 and migrating all users to Google Chat.

== Features ==
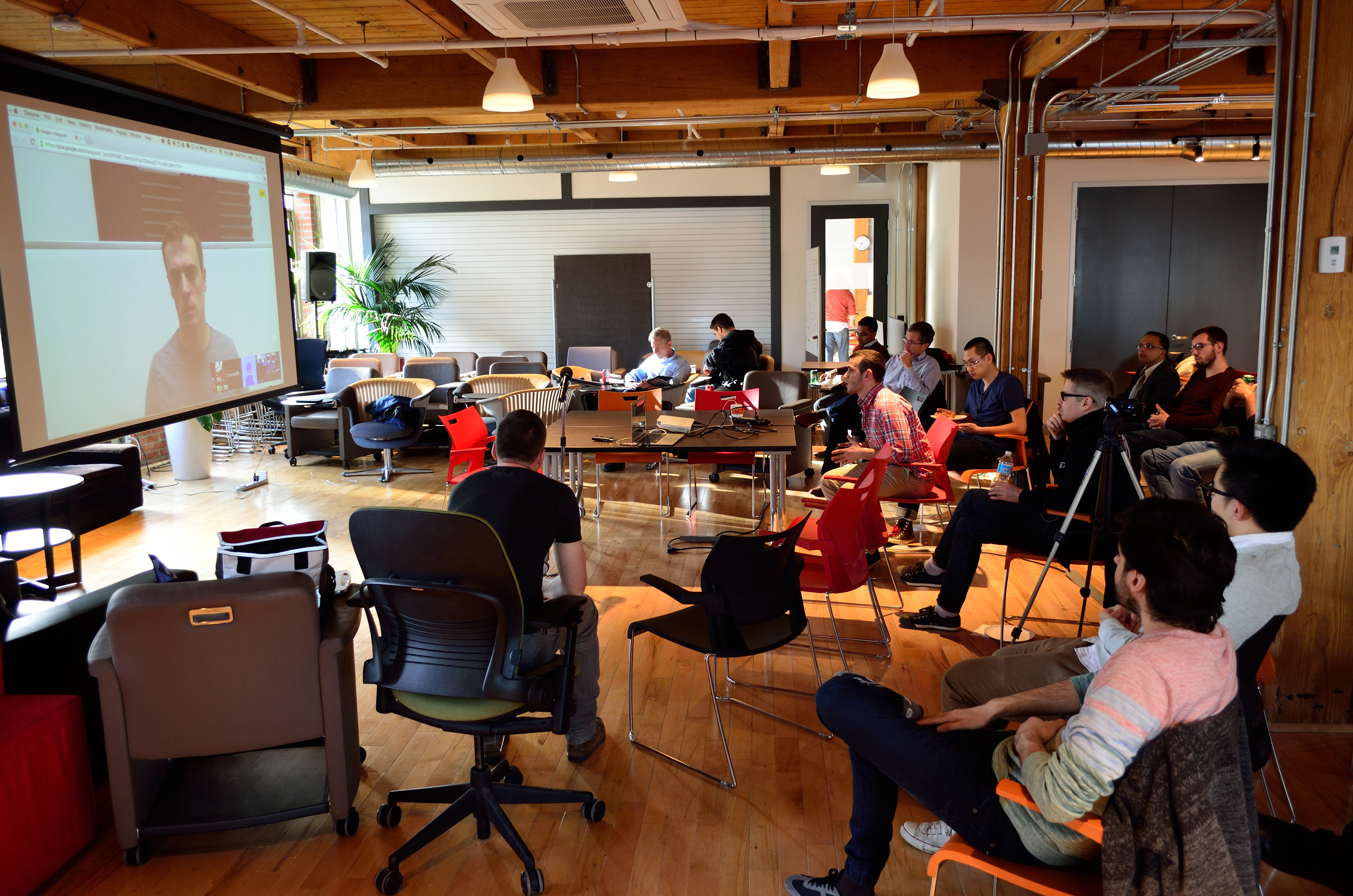
A video conference meeting facilitated by Google Hangouts

Hangouts allowed conversations between two or more users. The service could be accessed online through the Gmail or Google+ websites, or through mobile apps available for Android and iOS (which were distributed as a successor to their existing Google Talk apps). However, because it used a proprietary protocol instead of the XMPP open standard protocol used by Google Talk, most third-party applications which had access to Google Talk did not have access to Google+ Hangouts.

Chat histories were saved online which allowed them to be synced between devices. A "watermark" of a user's avatar was used as a marker to indicate how far they have read into the conversation. Photos could be shared during conversations, which were automatically uploaded into a private Google+ album. Users could also use color emoji symbols in their messages.

As with the previous Google+ Hangouts, users could also perform a group video chat with up to 10 users at a time. In 2016 Google upgraded Hangouts to 25 concurrent users in HD video for Work/Education. The new Google Hangouts app on iOS integrated a Google Voice number to some extent, but on Android the SMS supported in Hangouts didn't fully integrate with Google Voice for calls or texts. Integration was first expected by 2014 but was deprecated in January 2016. The reason for the delay appears tied to Google switching away from the XMPP protocol it used, as mentioned above.

For Google Chrome, users did not need to install a plugin. However, for Internet Explorer 11, the user had to install the "Google Talk Plugin" to be able to use the video features.

In Android 4.4, Hangouts was integrated with text messages sending and receiving functions, which is the default SMS app on the Nexus 5. For other Android phones, users could choose to open the SMS function when they download the new version of Hangouts via Google Play. SMS conversations were shown in a drawer on the left side. The update also added GIF support and a new location-sharing button, which allowed the user to send their GPS location to their contacts.

Hangouts included the ability to make free voice calls to other Hangouts users, and charged users (via pre-registered credit) to call landline and mobile phones internationally except for calls to the United States and Canada which were free of charge. Currently, Android users had to have both the Google Hangouts and Hangouts Dialer apps installed if they wish to call landline or mobile telephone numbers via the public switched telephone network. Users will have to use YouTube Live for live-streaming events.

== Reception ==
In May 2013, Google Hangouts faced criticism from the Electronic Frontier Foundation as they felt that Google was "moving in the wrong direction" by shrinking its support for the open standard protocol XMPP. The new protocol made it much more difficult for multi-chat clients like Pidgin and Adium to support Google Hangouts, requiring reverse engineering the protocol. Additionally, the tight integration of Google Hangouts and Google+ could have led to the unwilling sharing of personal information with others.

In November 2014, Make Use Of hailed Google Hangouts as the "best messaging app on Android by far".

In December 2015, Google Hangouts was given a score of 2 out of 7 on the Electronic Frontier Foundation's Secure Messaging Scorecard, receiving points for having communications encrypted in transit and for having completed a recent independent security audit, but missing points for communications being encrypted with keys that the provider has access to, users not being able to verify contacts' identities, past messages not being secure if the encryption keys were stolen, the code not being open to independent review, and the security design not being properly documented.

== See also ==
- Google Duo
- Google Allo
- Google Messages
- Google Talk
- List of video telecommunication services and product brands
- Comparison of cross-platform instant messaging clients
- Comparison of VoIP software
