= Google Talk =

Defunct instant messaging service

- Screenshot Screenshot of Google Talk in 2008
- Developer: Google
- Release: August 24, 2005; 21 years ago
- Stable release: Windows Plugin: 3.19.1.13088 (May 14, 2013; 13 years ago) [±]
- Preview release: Google Talk Labs Edition [±]
- Operating system: List: Android; BlackBerry OS (third party apps); BlackBerry 10; Linux; Maemo; webOS; Windows Mobile; iOS; Windows; ChromeOS; macOS
- Successor: Google Hangouts
- Available in: English, German, French, Italian, Japanese, Korean, Dutch, Polish, Portuguese, Russian, Turkish, Chinese, Spanish
- Type: VoIP/instant messaging client
- License: Proprietary software
- Website: web.archive.org/web/20130514014126/http://www.google.com/talk/

Google Talk was an instant messaging service that provided both text and voice communication. The instant messaging service was variously referred to colloquially as Gchat, Gtalk, or Gmessage among its users.

Google Talk was also the name of the client applications previously offered by Google to use the service. Google Talk applications were available for Microsoft Windows, Android, BlackBerry OS, BlackBerry 10 and ChromeOS operating systems. A Google Talk mobile web app had also been previously available. In February 2015, the Windows client was discontinued and ceased to work, with Google recommending users to use Google Hangouts instead. Users of Windows client were instructed to migrate to the Google Hangouts app on the Chrome browser platform.

== Features ==
=== Product integration ===
Google Talk was integrated into Gmail in 2006, where users could send instant messages to other Gmail users. As it worked within a browser, the Google Talk client did not need to be downloaded to send instant messages to Gmail users.

Conversation logs were automatically saved to a "Chats" area in the user's Gmail account. This allowed users to search their chat logs and have them centrally stored in their Gmail accounts. For a long time, it was not possible to directly download chat logs that were not attached to an email conversation, although some workarounds had been found. However, on September 15, 2011, Google announced a new feature of its Google Takeout program that allows users to download chat logs via IMAP.

Google also integrated Google Talk with Orkut. This enabled Google Talk users to interact with registered Orkut users, by sending and receiving "scraps" within Orkut. Orkut has since been shut down.

Google Talk Gadget was a web-based module that could be embedded in iGoogle (since discontinued) and other web pages, allowing text chat with users of Google Talk. This functionality was at some point discontinued without any real announcement, likely in the face of the release of the Google Hangouts services.

Google+ was integrated into Google Talk. In the standalone client and the Google Talk widget embedded into Gmail and Google+, Google+ contacts appeared in the contacts list; their respective circles were shown in Google+'s iteration of the widget. Google+ has since been shut down.

=== Voice and Video ===
It was possible to place and receive phone calls from within Gmail by using Google Talk. In order to receive calls, however, the user had to upgrade to a full Google Voice account. Initially, users outside of the US could not upgrade to a full Google Voice account or receive phone calls in Gmail. (Outbound calling through Gmail did not require Google Voice and was available in many countries outside the US.) Google Talk allowed users to leave a voicemail for a contact whether or not they were signed into Google Talk. Messages could be up to 10 minutes long and users could choose to have them sent to their Gmail inbox. Messages could be sent with or without first ringing the recipient's phone number.

Google also provided a Voice and Video Chat browser plugin for Google Talk (not to be confused with the standalone Google Talk client) that supported voice and video chat between Gmail users. The plugin was available for Windows (XP, Vista, and 7), Mac OS X (only on Intel-based Macs), and Linux (Debian, Ubuntu, Fedora, and OpenSUSE packages available, but the binaries worked on other systems). The plugin had to be downloaded and installed, but otherwise seamlessly integrated into the Gmail interface.

=== Encryption ===
The connection between the Google Talk client and the Google Talk server was encrypted, except when using Gmail's chat over HTTP, a federated network that didn't support encryption, or when using a proxy like IMLogic. End-to-end messages were unencrypted. Some XMPP clients natively supported encryption with Google Talk's servers. It was possible to have end-to-end encryption over the Google Talk network using OTR (off-the-record) encryption using other chat clients like Adium (for Mac) or Pidgin (for Linux and Windows).

Google's version of "Off the Record" was not OTR (off-the-record) encryption. Enabling "off the record" inside Gmail's Chat turned off logging of messages, but did not enable encryption.

=== Offline messaging ===
On November 1, 2006, Google introduced offline messaging to Google Talk. This allowed users to send messages to their contacts, even if they were not signed in. They would receive the messages when they next went online even if the user who had sent it was offline. This only worked between Gmail-accounts, not between Google Talk servers and other XMPP servers.

=== Mobile device compatibility ===
On June 30, 2006, Nokia released new software for their Nokia 770 Internet Tablet, that included Google Talk as one of the compatible VoIP clients, because of the XMPP-based software. Another Google Talk-compatible device was Sony's mylo, released on September 15, 2006. A Google Talk client was also available for BlackBerry devices from the BlackBerry site. Google Talk support was also integrated into Google Android devices, but did not support voice and video calls below Android version 2.3.4. This was released in April 2011 for the Google Nexus S.

However, given that Google Talk provided XMPP protocol, most mobile phones for which a suitable XMPP client existed could also offer Google Talk service, at least theoretically (depending on the handset, the user may have encounter security warnings because of unsigned Java ME MIDlets or limits put in place by the mobile service provider). Mobile clients specially designed for Google Talk existed as well.

Most phones supported the IMPS protocol, and there was hybrid XMPP/IMPS networks (through XMPP transports, or specially designed hybrid servers), which could also contact Google Talk users. The Google Talk service itself was unusable from IMPS (that means, one could not log with their Gmail account, but they could talk with their Gmail friends with their IMPS account from their mobile phone).

For most smartphones, including Symbian-based as well as Android, third-party applications such as Nimbuzz and Fring included support for Google Talk accounts, including VoIP calls.

=== Text formatting ===
Google Talk did not provide the user with a menu for text formatting. Nevertheless, Google Talk did support some text formatting features like making text bold and italic. To write a message in bold, a user could type the required text between two asterisks (*), for example, *this text would be bold in Google Talk*. Similarly for making text italic, one could put text between underscores (_) and for strike-through in text content, one could put text in between dashes (-). This only functioned in some of the Google native tools, and did not always function as expected when received from other XMPP clients.

== History ==
A screenshot showing the Google Talk, Labs Edition preview release

=== 2005 ===
On August 22, 2005, The New York Times reported a rumor of a Google-branded "communications tool" service and the Los Angeles Times provided details. Subsequently, the subdomain talk.google.com was found to have an active XMPP server. Two methods of logging into the server were discovered soon after and the ensuing response by eager bloggers revealed to numerous others how to log in before the official release by Google.

On the evening of August 23, many logged-in users using port 5222 to connect were disconnected and unable to log back in. Users using port 5223 to connect were still able to log in, and at 04:12:52 UTC those users received a broadcast instant message from gmail.com, an apparently official username used by Google to communicate with their user base, that stated "The broken link has been fixed. Thanks for being our first users!" Port 5222-connectivity was found to have been re-enabled. On August 24, Google Talk was officially launched.

On December 15, 2005, Google released libjingle, a C++ library to implement Jingle, "a set of extensions to the IETF's Extensible Messaging and Presence Protocol (XMPP) for use in voice over IP (VoIP), video, and other peer-to-peer multimedia sessions." Libjingle is a library of the code that Google uses for peer-to-peer communication, and was made available under a BSD license.

=== 2006 ===
In 2006, Google reported that they were working on adding new features such as supporting SIP in a future release, which would broaden the userbase for the program.

On January 17, 2006, Google enabled server-to-server communications, federating itself with any XMPP server that supported the dialback protocol.

On February 7, 2006, Gmail received chat functionality, using Ajax for server–browser communication, and was integrated with Google Talk. It also added the ability to chat with a built-in XMPP client. Furthermore, the newly added function led to users nicknaming it GChat.

In August 2006, Google and eBay announced that they would look into making Google Talk users able to communicate with Skype: "The companies will also explore interoperability between Skype and Google Talk via open standards to enable text chat and online presence." However, with Microsoft's acquisition of Skype on May 10, 2011, such interoperability was suspended between Google and eBay.

Google integrated Google Talk with Orkut on November 8, 2006.

=== 2007 ===
On March 14, 2007, Google released the Google Talk Gadget, an Adobe Flash-based Talk module that could be added to iGoogle (formally the Google Personalized Homepage) or embedded in any web page, thus, allowing chat from any operating system which was supported by Adobe Flash Player as long as Adobe Flash Player was installed.

A screen shot was posted on May 18, 2007, as part of the Google Apps presentation, showing some phone integration in Google Talk. On March 2, 2008. a Google engineer confirmed they had been using it internally for some time.

On November 26, 2007, Google Talk released Group Chat capabilities. Before this, users could chat with only one person per window. Group chat allowed many users to chat with each other in an environment similar to IRC.

On December 6, 2007, Google upgraded its Gmail integrated chat to include AOL Instant Messenger chat capability. This allowed Gmail users to sign into the AIM chat service and communicate with any AIM user while still being signed on to the Google Talk service. The Google Talk gadget and client had not been upgraded to enable this feature, and no announcement had been made as to when it would be made available.

=== 2008 ===
On February 25, 2008, Google added a feature called "Chatback", which allowed a Google Talk account owner to chat with people who did not have one. The account owner first had to create a badge, which could be included in webpages. This badge showed the current availability of the owner. Clicking on the badge resulted in a chat request notification to the owner who could respond by clicking on the specified URL. During the conversation, both parties had to use the Google Talk Gadget and both parties remained anonymous to each other, even the Google Account name of the owner was not revealed to the other peer.

On November 11, 2008, Google Chat (voice and video chat) was launched enabling computer to computer voice and video chat. Clues from one of the first Google Chrome builds in December 2008 suggested that a new Talk client was in the works.

As XMPP Jingle specifications became a Draft Standard, Google updated libjingle to version 0.5.1 and stated that "Google Talk is in the process of being updated to be in full compliance with the Jingle specifications."

Google had a version of Google Talk called Google Talk, Labs Edition, though it lacked many features of Google Talk's other releases.

=== 2012 ===
On April 20, 2012, Google announced that it was shutting down the mobile web app for Google Talk.

In June 2012, Google announced that they were planning to revamp the chat experience by merging Google Talk with Hangouts and Google Messenger to reduce confusion and fragmentation.

=== 2013 ===
At the Google I/O Conference 2013 Google announced that they were replacing Google Talk, Google+ Messenger and the original Google+ Hangout video chat service with Google+ Hangouts.

On May 15, 2013, Google's manager of real-time communication products, Nikhyl Singhal, stated at Google I/O that the move to Google+ Hangouts would mean that XMPP (the protocol that allowed Google Talk to interoperate with other vendors and applications) will not be supported in Hangouts. Mr. Singhal stated that as long as Google Talk was available, 3rd party clients could be expected to continue to work.

=== 2014 ===
On October 30, 2014, Google announced on their Apps Updates blog that "The Google Talk app for Windows will continue to work for approximately two months before being turned off".

=== 2015 ===
On February 3, 2015, Google sent a system message to users stating, "Google Talk app for Windows will stop working on Feb 16, 2015. It is replaced by the new Hangouts Chrome app."

On February 13, 2015, Google developer Mayur Kamat posted a clarification that XMPP service relied-on by third-party chat apps would continue after the deprecation of the Windows-specific Google Talk client.

After Google officially stopped supporting Google Talk for Windows on February 23, 2015, the application continued to function normally during an apparent grace period lasting until February 28. As of that date, connection attempts returned an error message stating "Username and password do not match." Those users received a notification e-mail stating, in part: "We noticed you recently tried using the Google Talk app for Windows. We wanted to let you know that this was discontinued on February 23rd, 2015. We recommend giving Hangouts a try so you can chat with all your Google contacts."

The Google Talk for Windows application would purportedly still work by connecting through applications using the Jabber protocol including Pidgin and Gajim but could not connect directly through Google or Gmail.

=== 2017 ===
The Google Talk App for Android and the Google Chat tool in Gmail were discontinued on June 26, 2017, and no longer functioned. Users could still continue to use third-party XMPP clients to connect to the legacy Google Talk server, but only for 1-on-1 chat with Hangouts users.

=== 2022 ===
In May 2022, Google announced that the ability to connect to the legacy Google Talk server using third-party apps, which were the only remaining way to connect to Google Talk, would be shut down on June 16, 2022, rendering the service defunct.

== See also ==
- List of defunct instant messaging platforms
- List of defunct social networking services
- Google Buzz
- Google Chat
- Google Meet
