= Gemini Notebook =

Online tool for synthesizing documents

- Other names: NotebookLM
- Original author: Google
- Developer: Google Labs
- Release: 2023; 3 years ago

Stable release(s) [±]
- Android: 1.67.7 (Build 1023237852) / November 16, 2026; 3 days ago
- iOS (Note: Including iPadOS): 1.67.8 / November 17, 2026; 2 days ago
- Operating system: Android 10+, iOS 17+
- Included with: Gemini
- Website: notebook.google

An example of an AI-generated conversation by NotebookLM (January 2025)

Gemini Notebook, formerly known as NotebookLM, is an online research and note-taking retrieval-augmented generation tool developed by Google Labs that uses artificial intelligence (AI), specifically Google Gemini, to assist users in interacting with their documents.

Gemini Notebook is known for its Audio Overviews feature, which generates podcast-like discussions about the uploaded content. Google describes Gemini Notebook as a "virtual research assistant". People involved in the product's creation include popular science author Steven Johnson and product manager Raiza Martin.

Another feature is Video Overviews, which turn uploaded content into AI-generated video summaries with narration and visuals. Gemini Notebook is powered by Google's latest Gemini models.

== History ==
The tool was introduced in 2023 with the name "Project Tailwind". Later that year, Google rebranded the tool as NotebookLM and released it as an experimental product.

In October 2024, Google removed the "experimental" label from NotebookLM's user interface. In December 2024, the company launched a paid tier named NotebookLM Plus for enterprise customers, available through Google's Agentspace platform, Google Workspace, and Google Cloud. In February 2025, Google released NotebookLM Plus for individual users through the Google One AI Premium subscription plan.

On July 16, 2026, Google rebranded NotebookLM as Gemini Notebook.

== Features ==
Gemini Notebook can generate summaries, explanations, and answers based on content uploaded by users. In addition to plain text, the service can process websites, PDF documents, Google Docs, and Google Slides. It can also analyze YouTube videos from their transcripts.

The "Audio Overviews" feature, released in September 2024, generates conversational, podcast-like discussion between two AI hosts based on user-selected sources. The feature received attention for its ability to condense complex or lengthy documents into accessible audio summaries, although it has also been criticized for flattening content into a standardized format and generating content from an American cultural context rather than that of the uploaded documents. In December 2024, Google added a "Join" function to Audio Overviews, allowing users to join the AI-generated conversations and ask the hosts questions.

In 2025, Gemini Notebook added a new Video Overviews feature. Google expanded audio and video overviews to support more than 80 languages later that year. In November 2025, Gemini Notebook added "Infographic" and "Slide Deck" as new types of content that can be generated, with both features being powered by Google's image-generation model Nano Banana Pro. In December 2025, Google introduced a new Data Table output.

In March 2026, the Cinematic Video Overviews feature was released to Google AI Ultra subscribers.

== Adoption ==
The 2024 Spotify Wrapped used NotebookLM to generate podcast-style overviews of individual listening habits.

== Legal challenges ==
In 2026, journalist and former NPR host David Greene sued Google, alleging that NotebookLM's AI podcast-generation feature reproduced his distinctive voice without permission, a claim the company denied.
