= SS Eastland =

Passenger ship that rolled over in Chicago in 1915

Coordinates: 41°53′14.0″N 87°37′54.1″W

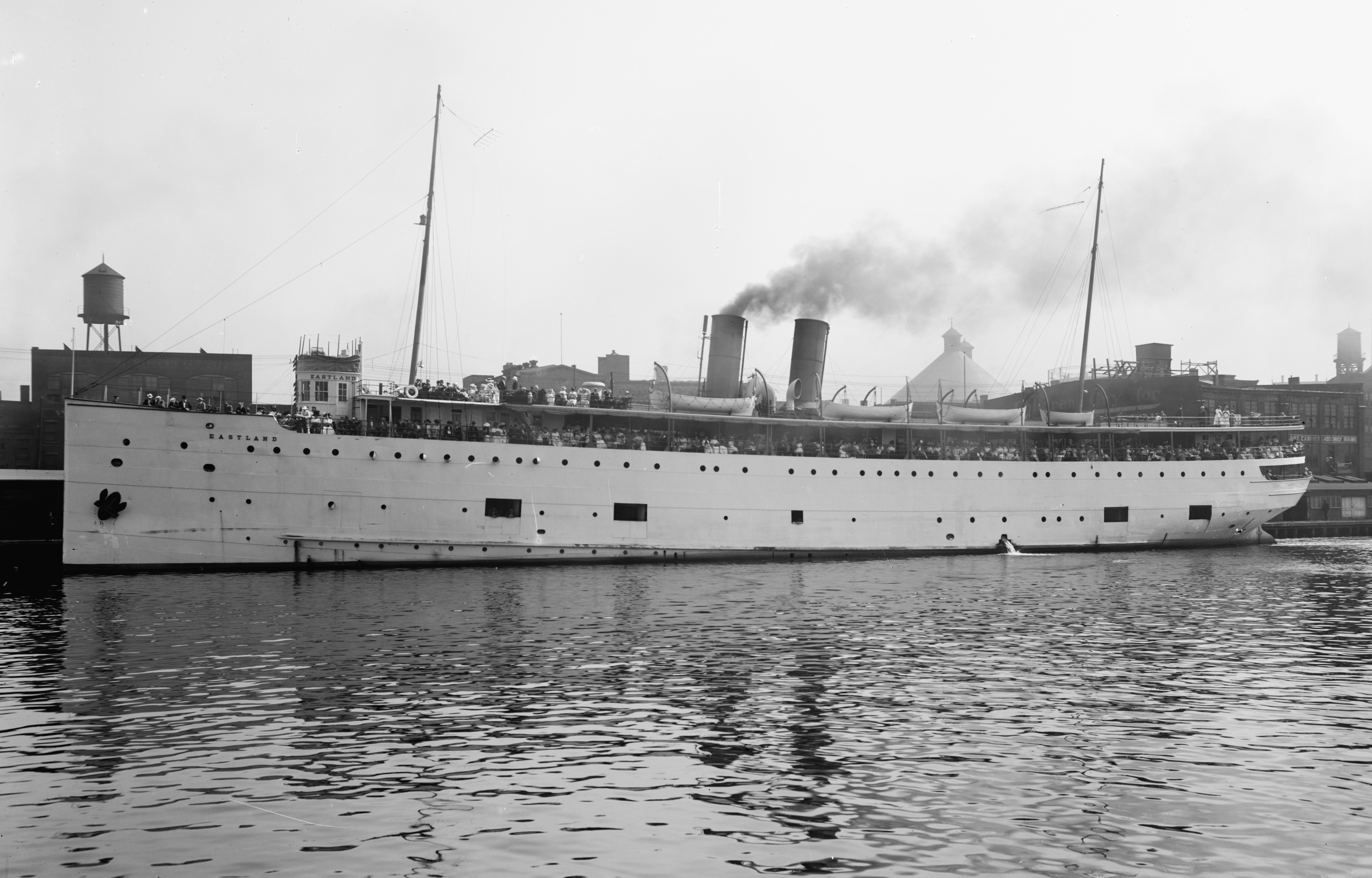
- SS Eastland in Cleveland, Ohio (1911)

History

United States
- Name: Eastland
- Owner: Michigan Steamship Company
- Route: South Haven, Michigan – Chicago, Illinois
- Ordered: October 1902
- Builder: Jenks Ship Building Company
- Launched: May 6, 1903; 123 years ago
- Christened: May 6, 1903 by Francis Elizabeth Stufflebeam
- Maiden voyage: July 16, 1903
- Nickname(s): "Greyhound of the Lakes"
- Fate: Company restructured in 1905 to the Michigan Transportation Company

United States
- Name: Eastland
- Owner: Michigan Transportation Company
- Operator: Chicago-South Haven Line
- Route: South Haven – Chicago route
- Fate: Sold August 5, 1906, to the Lake Shore Navigation Company of Cleveland, Ohio

United States
- Name: Eastland
- Owner: Lake Shore Navigation Company of Cleveland, Ohio
- Route: Cleveland-Cedar Point route
- Fate: Company restructured in 1909 to the Eastland Navigation Company of Cleveland, Ohio

United States
- Name: Eastland
- Owner: Eastland Navigation Company of Cleveland, Ohio
- Route: Cleveland-Cedar Point route
- Fate: Sold on June 1, 1914 to the St. Joseph-Chicago Steamship Company of St. Joseph, Michigan

United States
- Name: Eastland
- Owner: St. Joseph-Chicago Steamship Company of St. Joseph, Michigan
- Route: St. Joseph, Michigan, to Chicago route
- Fate: Raised after accident on 14 August 1915 and sold at auction on 20 December 1915 to Captain Edward A. Evers, sold on 21 November 1917 to the Illinois Naval Reserve

United States Navy
- Name: USS Wilmette
- Acquired: November 21, 1917
- Commissioned: September 20, 1918
- Recommissioned: June 29, 1920; 9 April 1945
- Decommissioned: July 9, 1919; 15 February 1940; 28 November 1945
- Renamed: Wilmette on February 20, 1918
- Reclassified: Gunboat 1918; IX-29 on February 17, 1941
- Stricken: December 19, 1945
- Honors and awards: World War I Victory Medal; (with Atlantic Fleet clasp); American Defense Medal; (with Fleet clasp); American Campaign Medal; World War II Victory Medal
- Fate: Sold for scrap on October 31, 1946 to Hyman Michaels Company of Chicago and scrapped, scrapping completed in 1947

General characteristics
- Type: Passenger ship
- Tonnage: 1,961 gross
- Displacement: 2,600 (estimated)
- Length: 265 ft (81 m)
- Beam: 38 ft 2 in (11.63 m)
- Draft: 19 ft 6 in (5.94 m)
- Installed power: Two triple expansion steam engines; Four Scotch marine boilers (coal fired); 1,750 shp
- Propulsion: Two shafts
- Speed: 16.5 knots (30.6 km/h; 19.0 mph)
- Capacity: As Eastland: 2,500 passengers, 70 crew (1915)
- Complement: As USS Wilmette: 209
- Armament: As USS Wilmette: Four 4-inch guns; Two 3-inch guns; Two 1-pounder guns
- Notes: Two funnels; Two masts

SS Eastland was an American Great Lakes passenger ship. On July 24, 1915, the ship capsized while tied to a dock in the Chicago River. In total, 844 passengers and crew were killed in what is, as of 2026, the largest loss of life from a shipwreck on the Great Lakes and the Chicago area.

After the disaster, Eastland was salvaged and sold to the United States Navy. After restorations and modifications, Eastland was designated a gunboat and renamed USS Wilmette. She was used primarily as a training vessel on the Great Lakes, and was scrapped after World War II.

== Construction ==
The ship was ordered in October 1902 by the Michigan Steamship Company and built by the Jenks Ship Building Company of Port Huron, Michigan. The ship was originally meant to be named The City of South Haven, but a rival company, the Dunkley Williams Transportation Company, built a ship with the same name. A brief construction contest was held to determine who could use the name The City of South Haven. Dunkley Williams ultimately won. As a result, the Michigan Steamship Company held another contest, asking anyone to submit a name for the ship. 565 proposals were ultimately sent in, with suggestions like Majestic or Hiawatha. The ship was named "Eastland" in May 1903, immediately before her inaugural voyage, by a Mrs. David Reid of South Haven. It was named as such because it was built for the lands east of Chicago.

== History ==
=== Early problems ===
On July 27th of her 1903 inaugural season, the ship struck the laid-up tugboat, George W. Gardner, which sank at its dock at the Lake Street Bridge in Chicago. Eastland received only minor damage with no fatalities.

=== Mutiny on the Eastland ===
On August 14th, 1903, while on a cruise from Chicago to South Haven, Michigan, six of the ship's firemen refused to stoke the fire for the ship's boiler, claiming that they had not received their potatoes for a meal. When they refused to return to the fire hole, Captain John Pereue arrested the six men at gunpoint. Firemen George Lippen and Benjamin Myers, who were not a part of the group of six, stoked the fires until the ship reached harbor. Upon the ship's arrival in South Haven, the six men were taken to the town jail and charged with mutiny. Shortly thereafter, Captain Pereue was replaced. The charges against the mutineers were eventually dropped months later.

=== Speed modifications ===
Because the ship did not meet a targeted speed of 22 miles per hour (35 km/h; 19 kn) during her inaugural season and had a draft too deep for the Black River in South Haven, Michigan, where she was being loaded, the ship returned in September 1903 to Port Huron for modifications, including the addition of an air conditioning system, an induced-draft system for the boilers to increase power, and repositioning of the ship's machinery to reduce the draft of the hull. Even though the modifications increased the ship's speed, the reduced hull draft and the extra weight mounted up high reduced the originally-designed metacentric height and inherent stability.

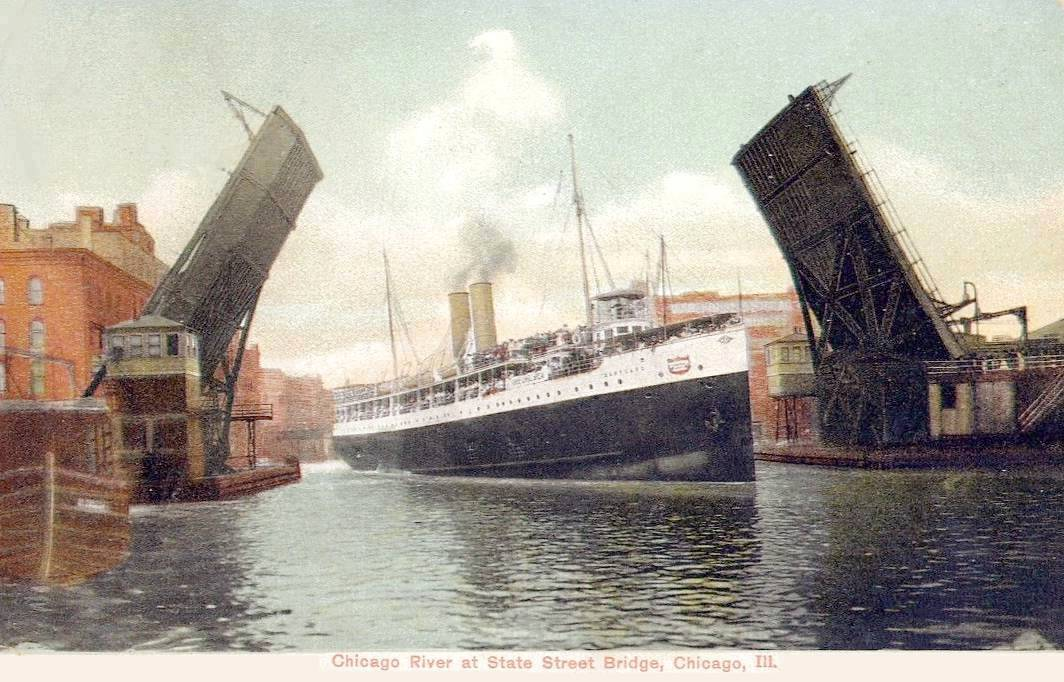
The SS Eastland under the State Street Bridge in Chicago

=== Listing incidents ===
Upon her return to South Haven in May 1904, the ship handily won a race to Chicago against The City of South Haven. In the meantime, Eastland was experiencing periodic problems with her stability while loading and unloading cargo and passengers, and nearly capsized on July 17th, 1904 after leaving South Haven with ~3,000 passengers. Fire hoses had to be used to maintain order. Subsequently, her capacity was lowered to 2,800 passengers, cabins were removed, lifeboats were added, and the hull was repaired. On August 5th, 1906, another listing incident occurred, which resulted in complaints filed against the Chicago–South Haven Line that had purchased the ship earlier that year.

Before the 1907 season, the ship was sold to the Lake Shore Navigation Company and moved to Lake Erie. In 1909, the ship was sold again to the Eastland Navigation Company, and continued running excursions between Cleveland and Cedar Point. After the 1909 season, the remaining 39 cabins were removed, and prior to the 1912 season, the top sections of smokestack were removed to shorten her stack height. On July 1st, 1912, another incident occurred when Eastland experienced a severe listing of ~25 degrees while loading passengers in Cleveland.

In June 1914, Eastland was sold to the St. Joseph–Chicago Steamship Company and returned to Lake Michigan for the St. Joseph, Michigan-to-Chicago service.

== The Eastland disaster ==
On July 24th, 1915, Eastland and four other Great Lakes passenger steamers—Theodore Roosevelt, Petoskey, Racine, and Rochester—were chartered to take employees from Western Electric Company's Hawthorne Works in Cicero, Illinois to a picnic in Michigan City, Indiana.

The federal Seamen's Act, championed by Senator Robert LaFollette, had been passed in March 1915 following the RMS Titanic disaster three years earlier. The law required retrofitting a complete set of lifeboats on Eastland, as on many other passenger vessels. This additional weight may have made Eastland more dangerous by making her even more top-heavy. Some argued that other Great Lakes ships would suffer from the same problem, but the bill was nonetheless signed into law by President Woodrow Wilson. Eastland's owners could choose to either maintain a reduced capacity or add lifeboats to increase capacity, and they elected to add lifeboats in order to qualify for a license that would increase the ship's capacity to 2,570 passengers. Eastland was already so top-heavy that she had special restrictions concerning the number of passengers that could be carried. In June 1914, Eastland had again changed ownership, this time bought by the St. Joseph and Chicago Steamship Company, with Captain Harry Pederson appointed the ship's master. In 1914, the company removed the old hardwood flooring of the forward dining room on the cabin level and replaced it with 2 inches (51 mm) of concrete. It also added a layer of concrete near the aft gangway. This added 15–20 tons of weight.

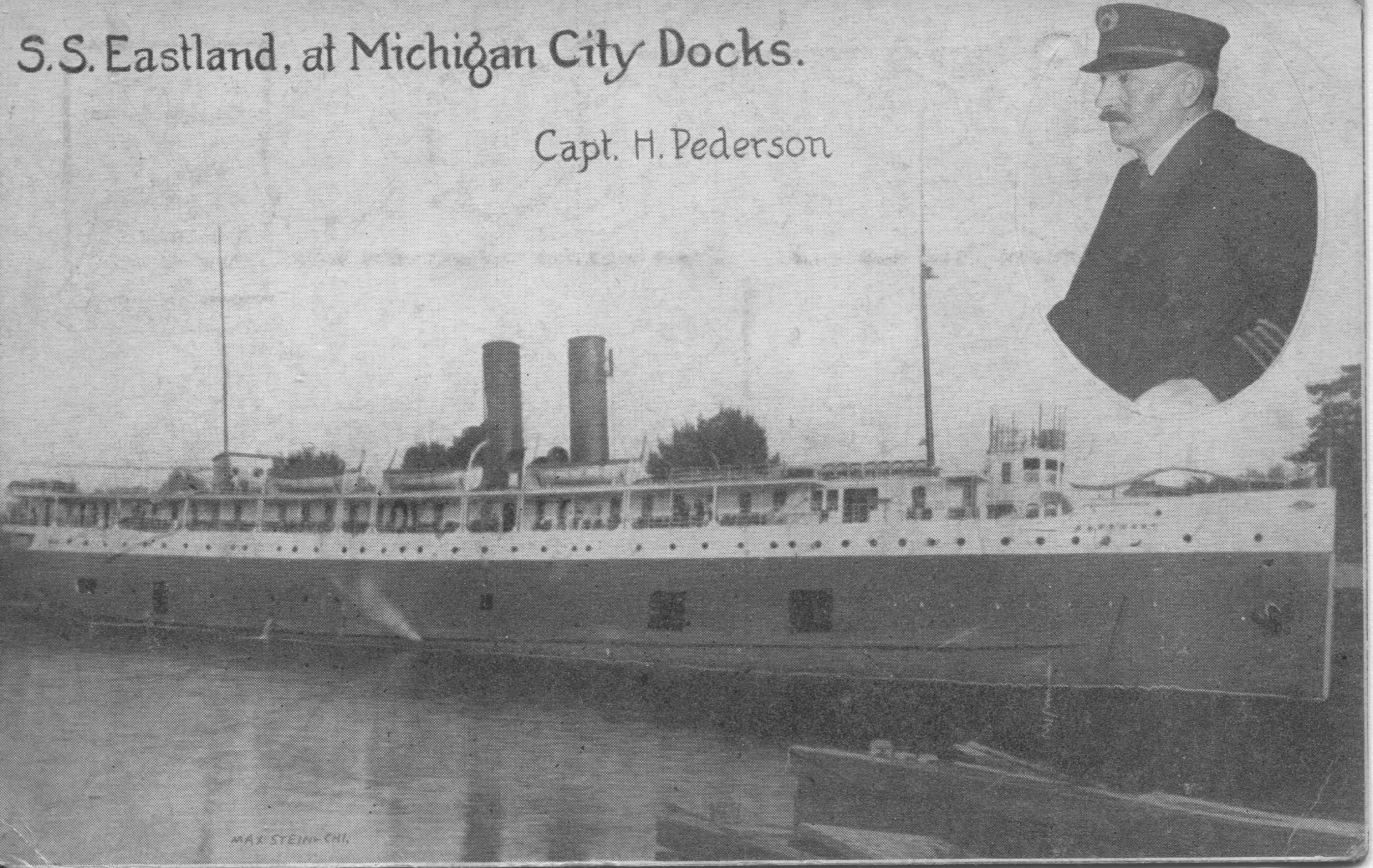
Postcard of the Eastland and Pederson; postmarked 24 July 1915

On the morning of July 24th, passengers began boarding Eastland on the south bank of the Chicago River between Clark and LaSalle Streets at ~6:30 a.m.; by 7:10 a.m., the ship had reached her capacity of 2,500 passengers. Many passengers were standing on the open upper decks when the ship began to list slightly to the port side (away from the wharf). The crew attempted to stabilize the ship by admitting water into her four ballast tanks, but to little avail. At 7:28 a.m., Eastland lurched sharply to port and rolled completely onto her port side, coming to rest on the river bottom, which was only 20 feet (6.1 m) below the surface; barely half of the vessel was submerged. Many passengers had already moved below decks on the cool and damp morning to warm themselves before the departure. Consequently, hundreds were trapped inside by the water and the sudden rollover, and some were crushed by heavy furniture, which included pianos, bookcases, and tables. The ship was only 20 feet (6.1 m) from the wharf. Captain John O'Meara and the crew of the nearby vessel, Kenosha, responded quickly by pulling alongside the hull to allow stranded passengers to leap to safety. Other notable heroes of the day included Peter Boyle, a deckhand from SS Petoskey who drowned while saving passengers, and Helen Repa, a Western Electric nurse who commanded much of the rescue operation. However, 841 passengers and 2 crew members died. Many of the passengers on Eastland were immigrants, with large numbers from present-day Czech Republic, Poland, Norway, Germany, Ireland, Sweden, Denmark, Italy, Hungary, and Austria. Many of the Czech immigrants had settled in Cicero; of the Czech passengers aboard, 220 perished in the disaster.

The bodies were taken to temporary morgues established in the area for identification, with the nearby Reid, Murdoch & Co. Building (the headquarters of the Britannica company as of 2026) acting as one such place. By the afternoon, the remaining unidentified bodies were consolidated in the armory of the 2nd Regiment.

In the aftermath, the Western Electric Company provided $100,000 (equivalent to $3.18 million in 2025) to relief and recovery efforts of the family members of the victims.

Among those scheduled to be on Eastland was 20-year-old football player, George Halas, later the coach and owner of the Chicago Bears and a founding member of the National Football League, who was delayed leaving for the dock and arrived after the ship had overturned. Halas's name was on the list of the deceased in newspapers, but was later revealed to be unharmed. His friend and future Bears executive, Ralph Brizzolara, and his brother were on Eastland when she capsized, but escaped through portholes. Despite rumors to the contrary, entertainer Jack Benny was neither aboard Eastland nor scheduled for the excursion.

The first known film footage of the recovery efforts was discovered and released in 2015.

Marion Eichholz (born July 12, 1912), the last known survivor, died on November 24, 2014, at the age of 102. She was three years old at the time of the disaster.

=== Media reports ===
Writer Jack Woodford witnessed the disaster and offered a first-hand account to the Herald and Examiner. In his autobiography, Woodford wrote:

And then movement caught my eye. I looked across the river. As I watched in disoriented stupefaction a steamer large as an ocean liner slowly turned over on its side as though it were a whale going to take a nap. I didn't believe a huge steamer had done this before my eyes, lashed to a dock, in perfectly calm water, in excellent weather, with no explosion, no fire, nothing. I thought I had gone crazy.

Carl Sandburg, then known better as a journalist than as a poet, wrote an angry account for The International Socialist Review, accusing regulators of ignoring safety issues and claiming that many of the workers were aboard following company orders for a mandatory staged picnic. Sandburg also wrote a poem, "The Eastland", which drew parallels between the disaster and the mistreatment and poor health of the lower classes. Sandburg concluded the poem with a comparison: "I see a dozen Eastlands/Every morning on my way to work/And a dozen more going home at night." The poem was considered too harsh for publication when written, but was eventually published in a collection of poems in 1993.

=== Inquiry and indictments ===
A grand jury indicted the president and three other officers of the steamship company for manslaughter, and the ship's captain and engineer for criminal carelessness. They found that the disaster was caused by "conditions of instability" caused by overloading of passengers, mishandling of the water ballast, and the ship's faulty construction.

During hearings regarding the extradition of the men to Illinois for trial, principal witness, Sidney Jenks, president of the company that built Eastland, testified that her first owners wanted a fast ship to transport fruit, so he designed one capable of reaching 20 mph (32 km/h) and carrying 500 passengers. Defense counsel, Clarence Darrow, asked whether Jenks had ever concerned himself with the potential conversion of the ship into a passenger steamer with a capacity of 2,500 or more passengers. Jenks replied, "I had no way of knowing the quantity of its business after it left our yards ... No, I did not worry about the Eastland." Jenks testified that a stability test of the ship was never performed, and stated that after tilting to an angle of 45 degrees at launching, "it righted itself as straight as a church, satisfactorily demonstrating its stability."

The court refused extradition, holding that the evidence was too weak, with "barely a scintilla of proof" to establish probable cause to find the six guilty. The court reasoned that the four company officers were not aboard the ship, and that every act charged against the captain and engineer was performed in the ordinary course of business, "more consistent with innocence than with guilt." The court also reasoned that Eastland "was operated for years and carried thousands safely," and therefore the accused were justified in believing the ship to be seaworthy.

=== Photo gallery ===
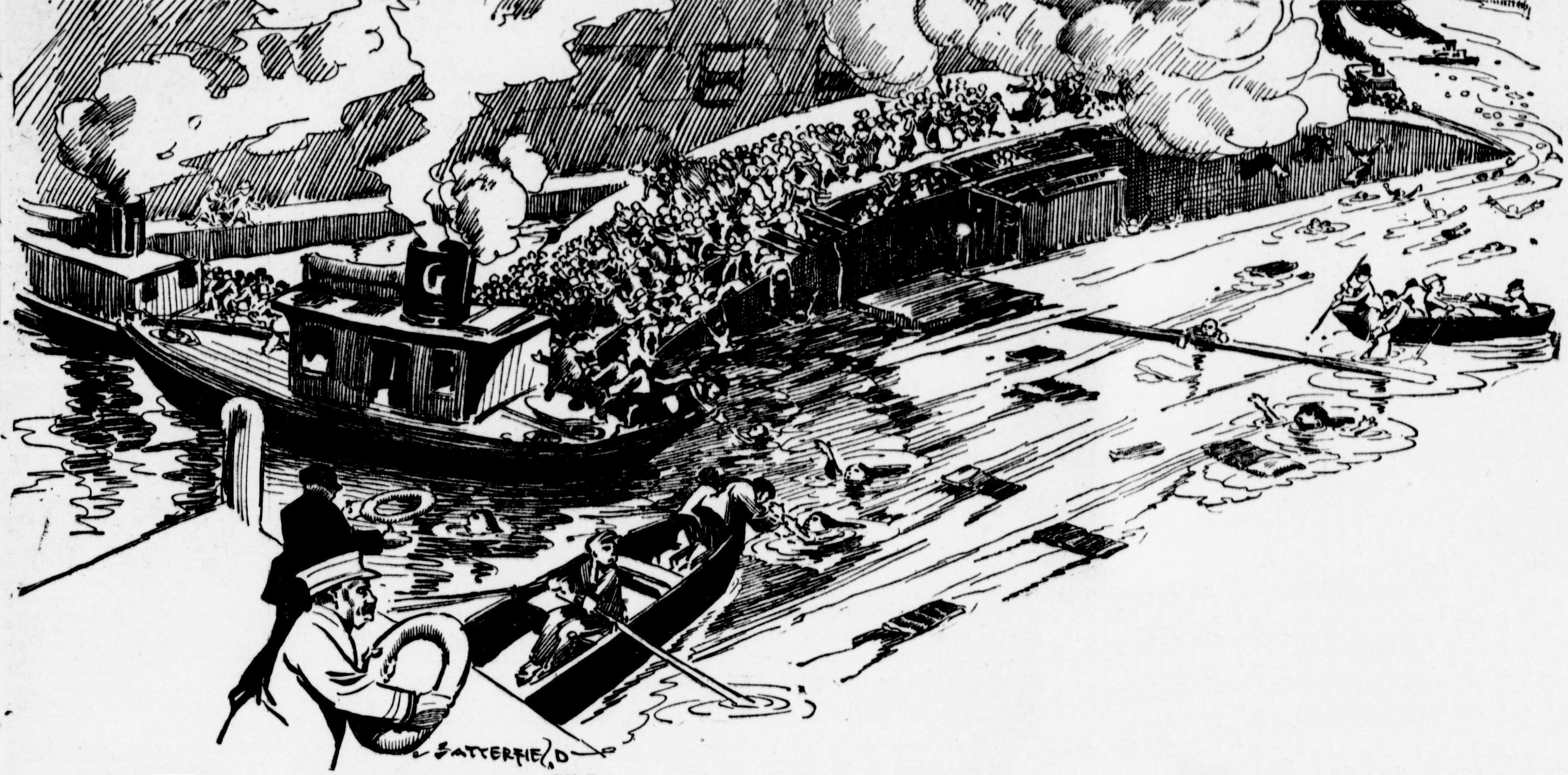
Cartoonist Bob Satterfield witnessed the capsizing from the Clark Street Bridge, and sketched it for his syndicate

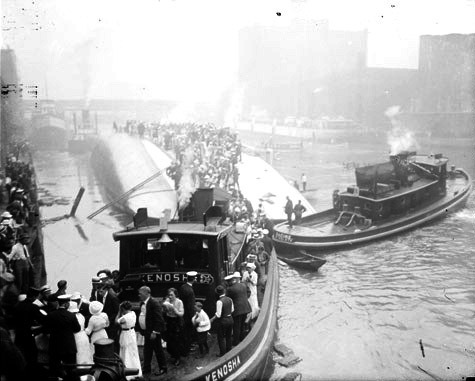
Passengers being rescued from the hull of the Eastland by a tugboat.

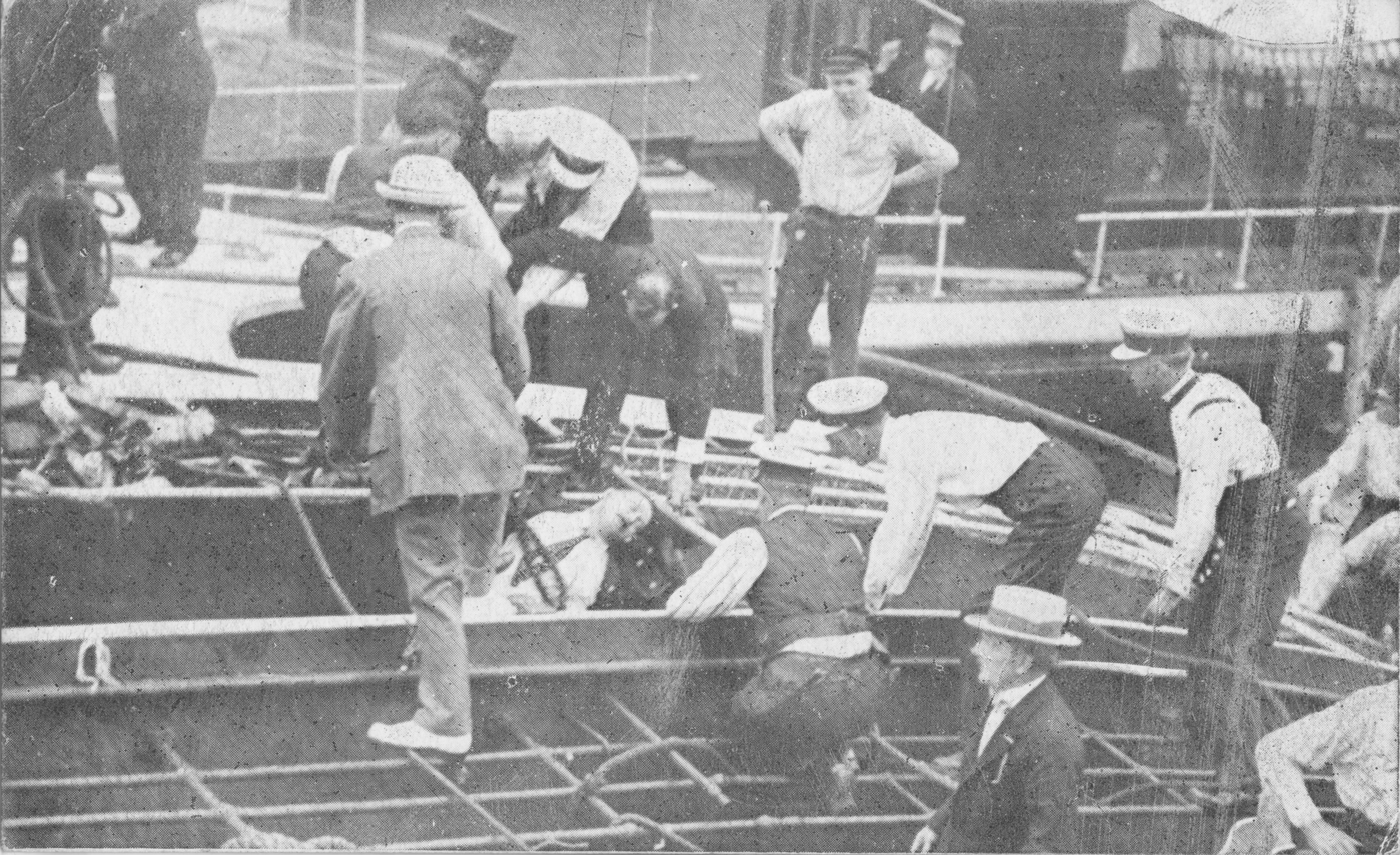
Victim recovered from the Eastland

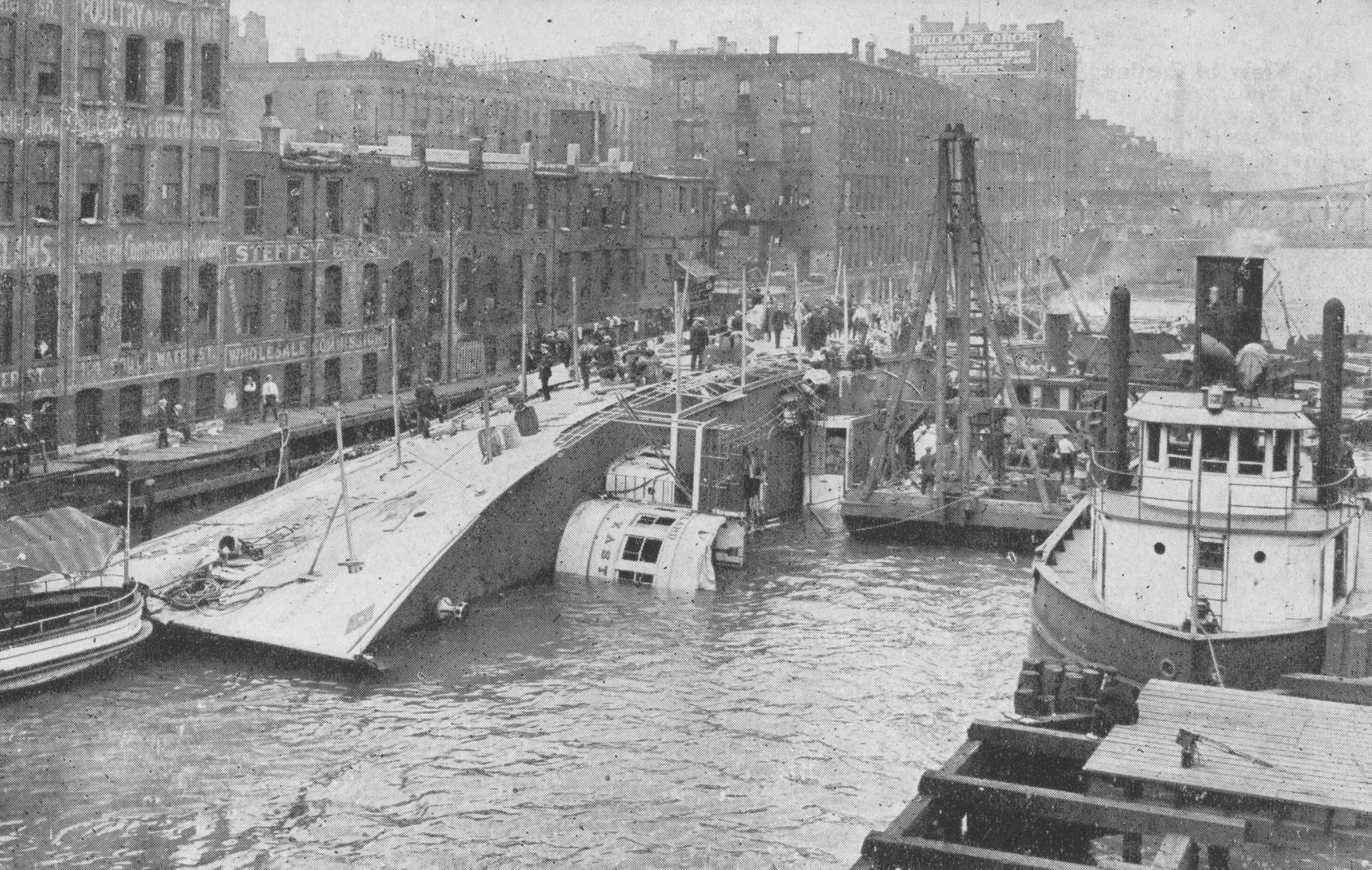
View of Eastland from fire tug.

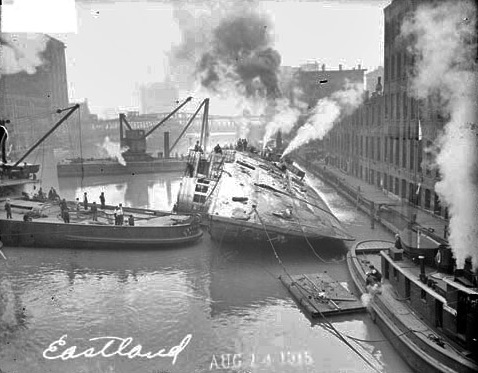
Eastland being righted after the disaster.

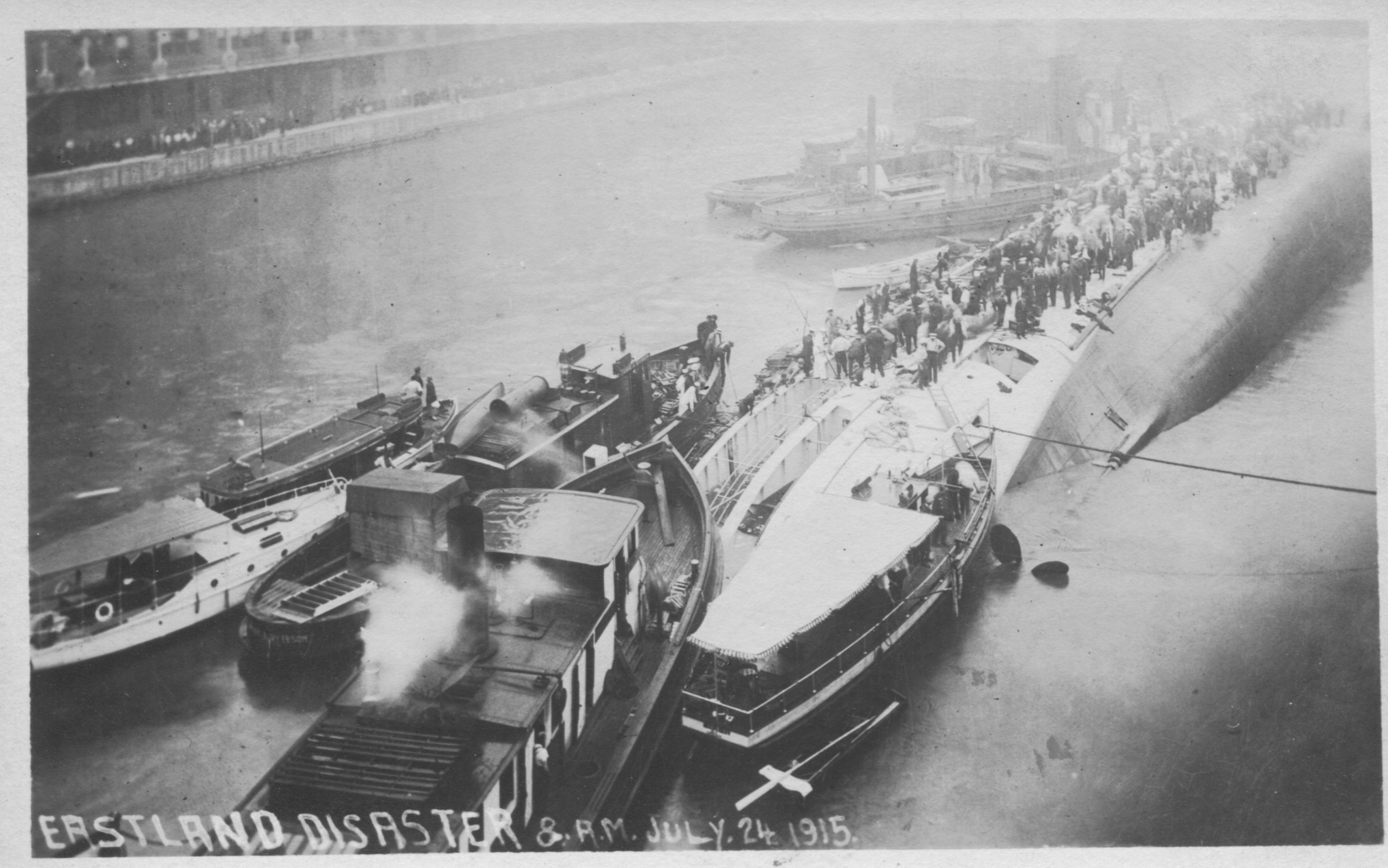
View of the Eastland rescue underway. From a post card

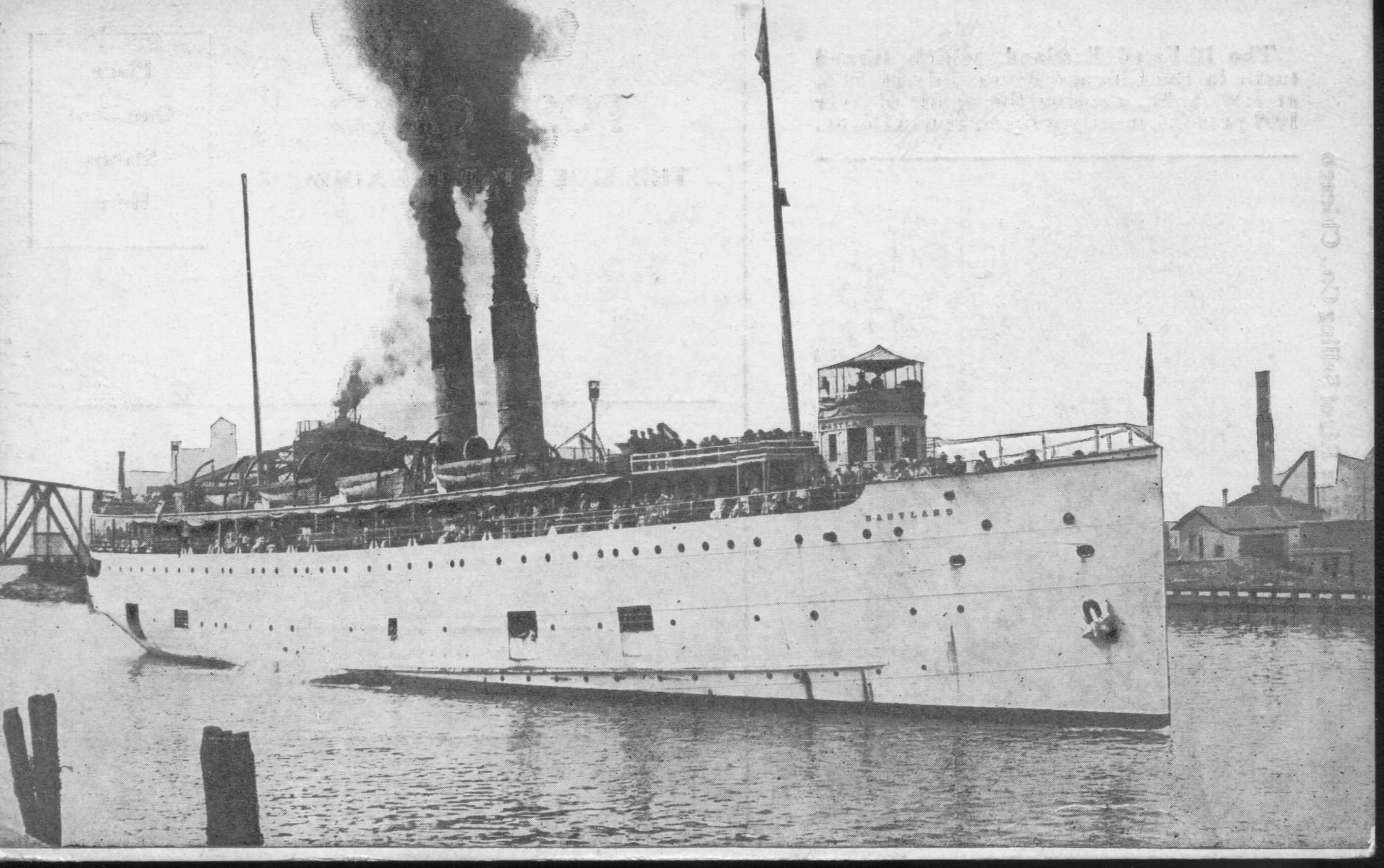
Postcard of Eastland. "The Ill Fated Eastland, which turned turtle in the Chicago River, July 24, 1915, at 7:30 A.M., causing the death of over 1000 persons, mostly women and children."

== Second life as USS Wilmette ==
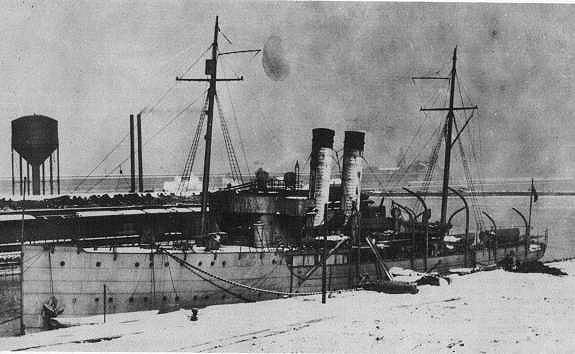
USS Wilmette, c. 1918

After Eastland was raised on August 14, 1915, she was sold at auction to the Illinois Naval Reserve. She was converted to a gunboat, renamed Wilmette on February 20, 1918, and commissioned on 20 September 1918 under captain William B. Wells. Commissioned late in World War I, Wilmette did not experience combat. It trained sailors and experienced normal upkeep and repairs until placed in ordinary at Chicago on 9 July 1919, retaining a 10-man caretaker crew aboard. On 29 June 1920, the gunboat was returned to full commission.

On June 7, 1921, Wilmette was tasked with sinking UC-97, a German U-boat surrendered to the United States after World War I. The guns of Wilmette were manned by gunner's mate J. O. Sabin, who had fired the first American cannon of World War I, and gunner's mate A. F. Anderson, the man who fired the first American torpedo of the war.

For the remainder of her 25-year career, the gunboat served as a training ship for naval reservists of the 9th, 10th and 11th Naval Districts. It made voyages along the shores of the Great Lakes carrying trainees assigned to her from the Naval Station Great Lakes. Wilmette was placed "out of commission, in service" on 15 February 1940.

Given hull designation IX-29 on February 17, 1941, she resumed training duty at Chicago on 30 March 1942, preparing armed guard crews for duty manning the guns on armed merchantmen. That assignment continued until the end of World War II in Europe obviated measures to protect transatlantic merchant shipping from German U-boats.

During August 1943, Wilmette transported President Franklin D. Roosevelt, Admiral William D. Leahy, James F. Byrnes and Harry Hopkins on a 10-day fishing vacation in McGregor and Whitefish Bay.

On April 9, 1945, she was returned to full commission for a brief interval. Wilmette was decommissioned on November 28, 1945, and her name was deleted from the Navy list on 19 December 1945. During 1946, Wilmette was offered for sale. On October 31, 1946, she was sold to the Hyman Michaels Company for scrapping, which was completed in 1947.

For her service in the US Navy, Wilmette was eligible for the following awards:

- World War I Victory Medal
- American Defense Service Medal
- American Campaign Medal
- World War II Victory Medal

== Memorials ==
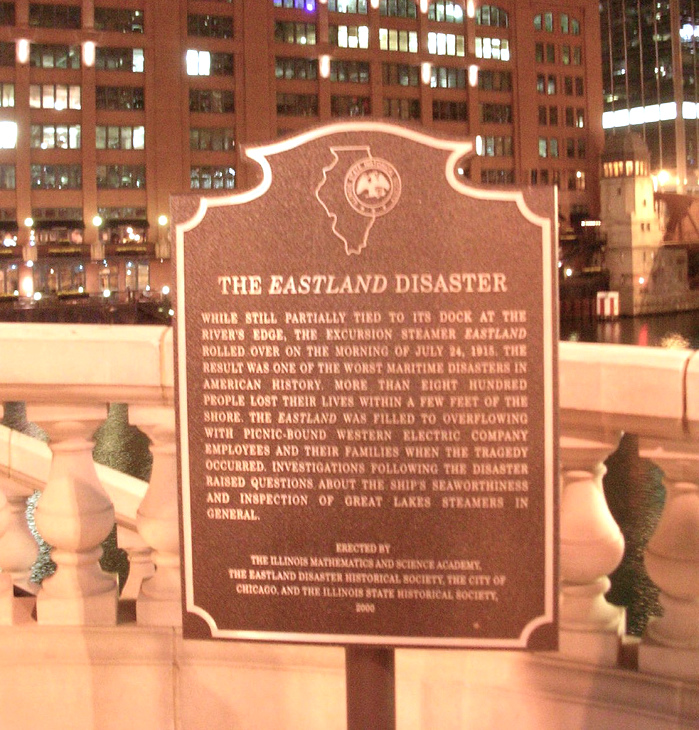
Historical marker along the Chicago River

A marker commemorating the accident was dedicated on 4 June 1989. This marker was reported stolen on April 26, 2000, and a replacement marker was installed and dedicated on 24 July 2003.

On July 12, 2015, 100 years after the disaster, a memorial to the dead in the form of a large ship wheel was dedicated at Bohemian National Cemetery in Chicago.

== In popular culture ==
The disaster was incorporated into the 1999 series premiere of the Disney Channel original series So Weird, in which teenage paranormal enthusiast Fiona Phillips encounters the ghost of a boy who drowned.

In 2012, Chicago's Lookingglass Theatre produced a musical entitled Eastland: A New Musical, written by Andy White and scored by Ben Collins-Sussman and Andre Pluess.

The Eastland disaster is also pivotal to the story of one family told in the play/musical Failure: A Love Story, written by Philip Dawkins, which premiered in Chicago in 2012 at Victory Gardens Theater. The play premiered in Los Angeles on 24 July 2015, the 100th anniversary of the tragedy. The play was again staged in Chicago at the Oil Lamp Theater and was nominated for multiple awards.

In 2024, Chicago's Neo-Futurists produced a puppetry show based on the disaster entitled Switchboard.

== See also ==
- List of maritime disasters
- PS General Slocum
- Sea Wing disaster
- RMS Empress of Ireland
