= Ben Sussman =

American software engineer, composer and author

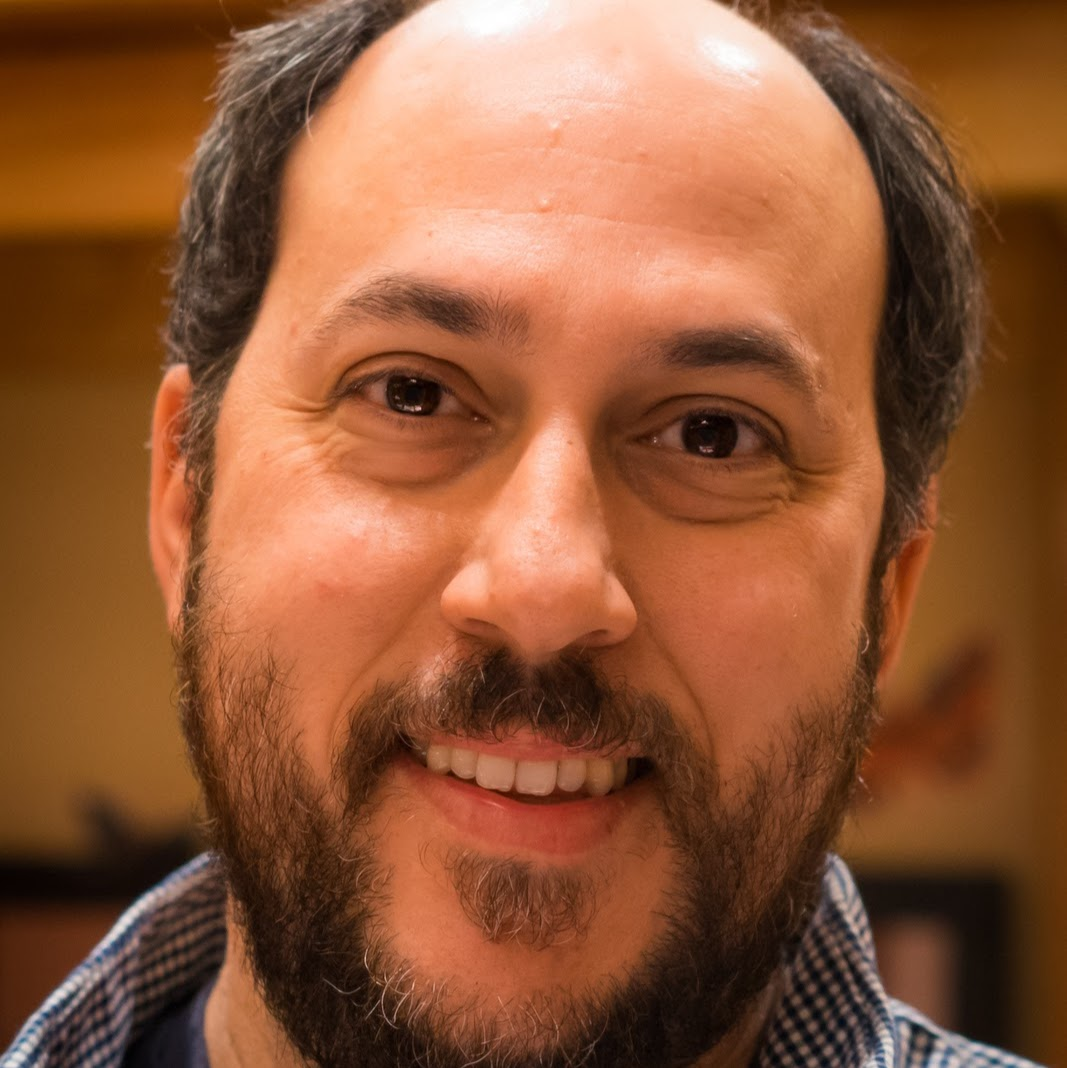
Ben Sussman in 2014

Ben Sussman is an American software engineer, composer, and author. He is the co-creator of the Subversion version control system, co-composer of the musicals Eastland and Winesburg, Ohio, and co-author of two books on software and management. He co-created two interactive fiction games, Rover's Day Out and Hoosegow. Sussman lives and works in Chicago, Illinois.

== Software ==
Sussman is one of the founding software engineers of the Subversion version control system, which was used by 36.9% of developers in the 2015 Stack Overflow Developer Survey. Sussman co-founded the Google Chicago engineering office in 2005, which employed more than 300 engineers as of 2019. He was a senior engineering manager leading a team focused on the latency of Google's search engine.

== Books ==
Sussman is the co-author of the book Version Control with Subversion along with C. Michael Pilato and Brian Fitzpatrick, published by O'Reilly Media in 2009. Sussman and Fitzpatrick co-authored Debugging Teams: Better Productivity through Collaboration, about managing software development teams, published by O'Reilly Media in 2015.

== Musical compositions ==
In collaboration with Andre Pluess, Sussman co-composed the music for two musicals, Eastland and Winesburg, Ohio.

=== Eastland ===
Eastland is a musical telling the story of a 1915 disaster in which the passenger ship SS Eastland capsized while moored in the Chicago River, killing 844 people. The musical opened in June 2012 and ran for 9 weeks. It was produced by the Tony Award-winning Lookingglass Theatre Company and was nominated for four Joseph Jefferson awards.

Time magazine reviewer Richard Zoglin wrote that "the elegiac mood, a sense of hard-working, turn-of-the-century Americans betrayed by the American dream, is heightened by the somber, folk-ballad flavor of the music — much of it played (on guitars and violins mostly) onstage by members of the cast." The Chicago Tribune arts reviewer Chris Jones wrote, "Pluess and Sussman are richly talented songwriters [...] whose rootsy melodies understand the musical language of the ordinary Midwesterner." The Chicago Time Out reviewer, Oliver Sava, wrote that the score "evokes O Brother, Where Art Thou? and Ragtime, though the lyrics can get heavy-handed."

=== Winesburg, Ohio ===
Winesburg, Ohio is a musical adaptation of Sherwood Anderson's novel of the same name about a small American town. It was developed by Chicago's About Face Theatre and Steppenwolf Theatre Company, and produced at Steppenwolf Theatre, Arden Theatre, and Kansas City Repertory Theatre. The Arden Theatre production won five Barrymore Awards for Excellence in Theater in 2005.

Chicago Tribune arts reporter Chris Jones wrote that "one is most struck by the beauty of the vocal music that Pluess and Sussman have woven into Anderson's poignant prose." Chicago Reader reviewer Justin Hayford said that "composers Andre Pluess and Ben Sussman create a haunting anthem revealing the town's inner life. It's a stirring opening, intricate in its dark shadings."

== Interactive fiction ==
Sussman co-created the interactive fiction title Rover's Day Out with Jack Welch, which in 2009 won the 15th Annual Interactive Fiction Competition, judged by the readership of the Usenet newsgroup rec.arts.int-fiction. Games reviewer Jimmy Maher described it as "an impressively intricate, multi-layered piece of fiction." Welch and Sussman also co-authored Hoosegow, which won the Casual Gameplay Design Competition #7 by influential game review website Jay Is Games in 2010.
