= Google Duo =

Defunct video chat mobile app by Google

- Screenshot A screenshot of Duo
- Developer: Google LLC
- Release: August 16, 2016; 10 years ago

Stable release(s) [±]
- Android: 174.0 / September 9, 2022; 4 years ago
- iOS: 174.1.0 / September 16, 2022; 4 years ago
- Operating system: Android 6.1.0 Marshmallow; iOS 10.1.1
- Predecessor: Google Hangouts
- Successor: Google Meet
- Type: Video chat mobile app
- Website: duo.google.com (Redirects to Google Meet)

Google Duo was a proprietary voice over IP (VoIP) and videotelephony service released in 2016 by Google and merged into its Google Meet product in 2022. It was available for Android, iOS and web browsers. It let users make and receive one-to-one and group audio and video calls with other Duo users in high definition, using end-to-end encryption by default. Duo could be used either with a phone number or a Google Account, allowing users to call someone from their contact list.

Google Duo was announced at Google's developer conference on May 18, 2016, and began its worldwide release on August 16, 2016. Google announced in 2022 that the service would be merged into Google Meet, and it was shut down by the end of the year.

== History ==
In December 2016, Google Duo replaced Hangouts within the suite of Google apps device manufacturers must install in order to gain access to the Google Play, with Hangouts instead becoming optional.

In August 2020, it was reported that Google was planning to eventually merge Google Duo with the business-oriented Google Meet. In December 2021 this objective had been dropped, but Duo continued to be available and updated. In June 2022, Google reversed course and announced that Duo and Meet would, in fact, be merged. The merger began in August, with the Duo mobile app renamed Meet and the original Meet app renamed "Google Meet (original)" and scheduled to be phased out. The Duo and Meet web apps completed their merger in 2024. Google Meet Legacy (Duo) calling is scheduled to be discontinued in January 2026.

== Technologies ==
Google Duo was optimized for low-bandwidth mobile networks through WebRTC and uses QUIC over UDP. Optimization was further achieved through the degradation of video quality through monitoring network quality. For packet loss concealment, Duo used Google DeepMind.

In February 2021, Google announced a new very low-bitrate codec for speech compression called "Lyra" that could operate with network speeds as low as 3 kbit/s that avoided robotic voice audio and that was to be rolled out to Duo.

According to a technical study commissioned by Google from the Signals Research Group in 2017 that compared degradation time over 3G, 4G, 5G and Wi-Fi, Duo provided the highest voice and video quality of any service or app.

== Features ==
"Knock Knock" showed a live preview of the caller before the recipient picked up, which Google said was to "make calls feel more like an invitation rather than an interruption".

In March 2017, it was announced that Google Duo would let users make audio-only calls. The feature was first launched in Brazil, with a global rollout in April.

A year later in March 2018, video and voice messages were added to Duo. Users could leave messages up to 30 seconds long for contacts who were unavailable.

Support for eight-person video calls in both the iOS and Android versions of the app was added in May 2019. In line with similar group calling offerings from FaceTime, Skype, WhatsApp, and Messenger, participants could join or leave the conversation at any time. Google Duo increased the maximum group size to 12 at the end of March 2020, and to 32 by May 2022.

== See also ==
- Google Meet
- Google Messages
- List of video telecommunication services and product brands
