= Google Meet =

Video-conferencing software developed by Google

- Logo since May 2026

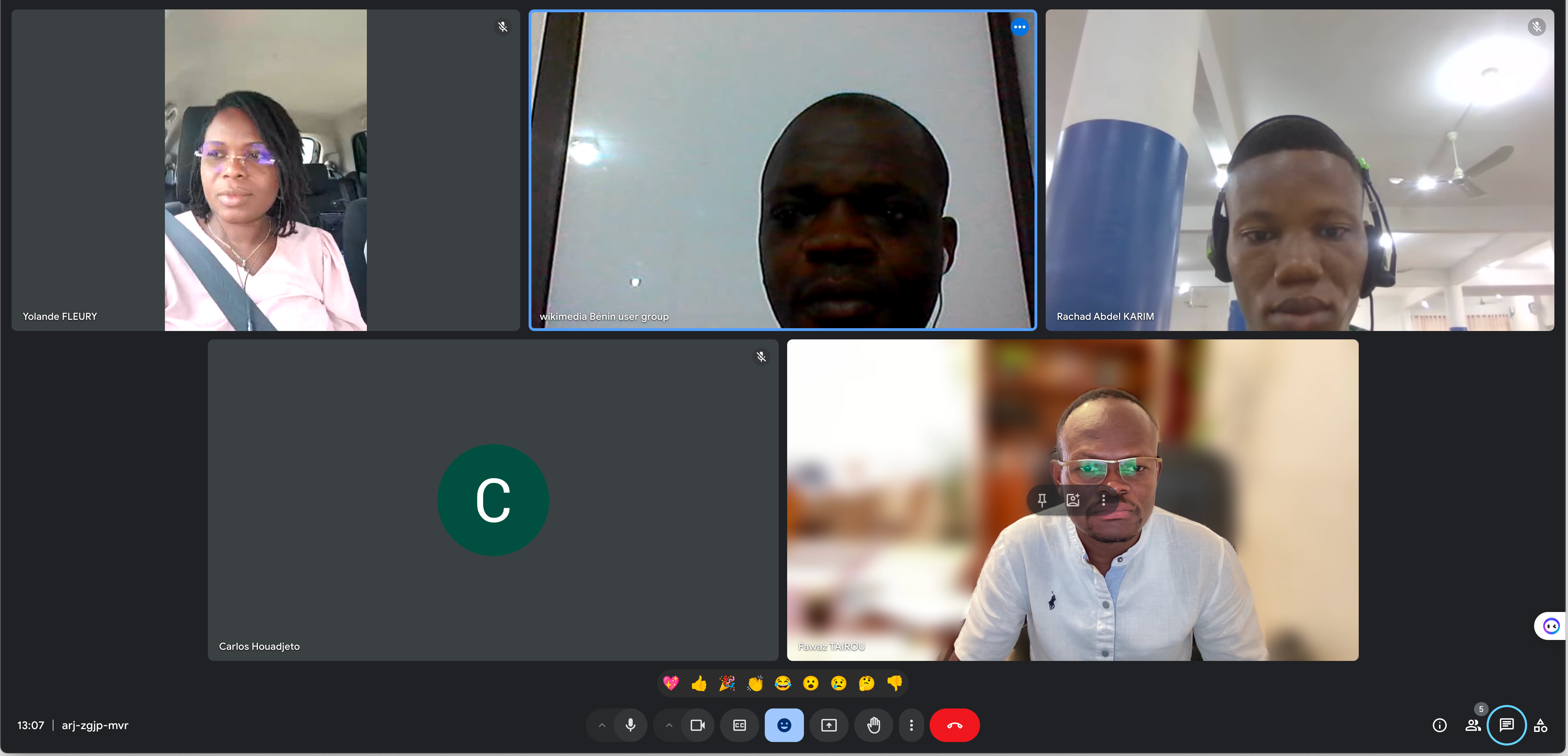
- Screenshot Screenshot
- Developer: Google
- Release: March 9, 2017; 9 years ago

Stable release(s) [±]
- Android, Duo: 371.0 (Build 958218800) / August 6, 2026; 3 months ago
- iOS, Duo (Note: Including iPadOS): 371.0 / August 10, 2026; 3 months ago
- Android TV (discontinued): 280.0 (Build 697572660) / November 21, 2024; 23 months ago
- Android, original (discontinued): 2024.06.23 (Build 645915839) / June 27, 2024; 2 years ago
- iOS, original (discontinued): 114.1.0 / May 1, 2023; 3 years ago
- Operating system: Android 6+; iOS 18+; ChromeOS; Fuchsia; web; Discontinued: Android TV
- Predecessor: Google Duo; Google Hangouts
- Type: Communication software
- License: Freemium
- Website: meet.google.com
- Repository: github.com/googleworkspace

Google Meet is a video communication service developed by Google. It is one of two apps that constitute the replacement for Google Hangouts, the other being Google Chat. It replaced the consumer-facing Google Duo on November 1, 2022, with the Duo mobile app being renamed Meet and the original Meet app set to be phased out.

In the early months of the COVID-19 pandemic, Google announced Meet was to be made available to all users, not just Google Workspace users which it previously was. The use of Meet grew by a factor of 30 between January and April 2020, with 100 million users a day accessing Meet, compared to 200 million daily users for Zoom as of the last week of April 2020.

== History ==
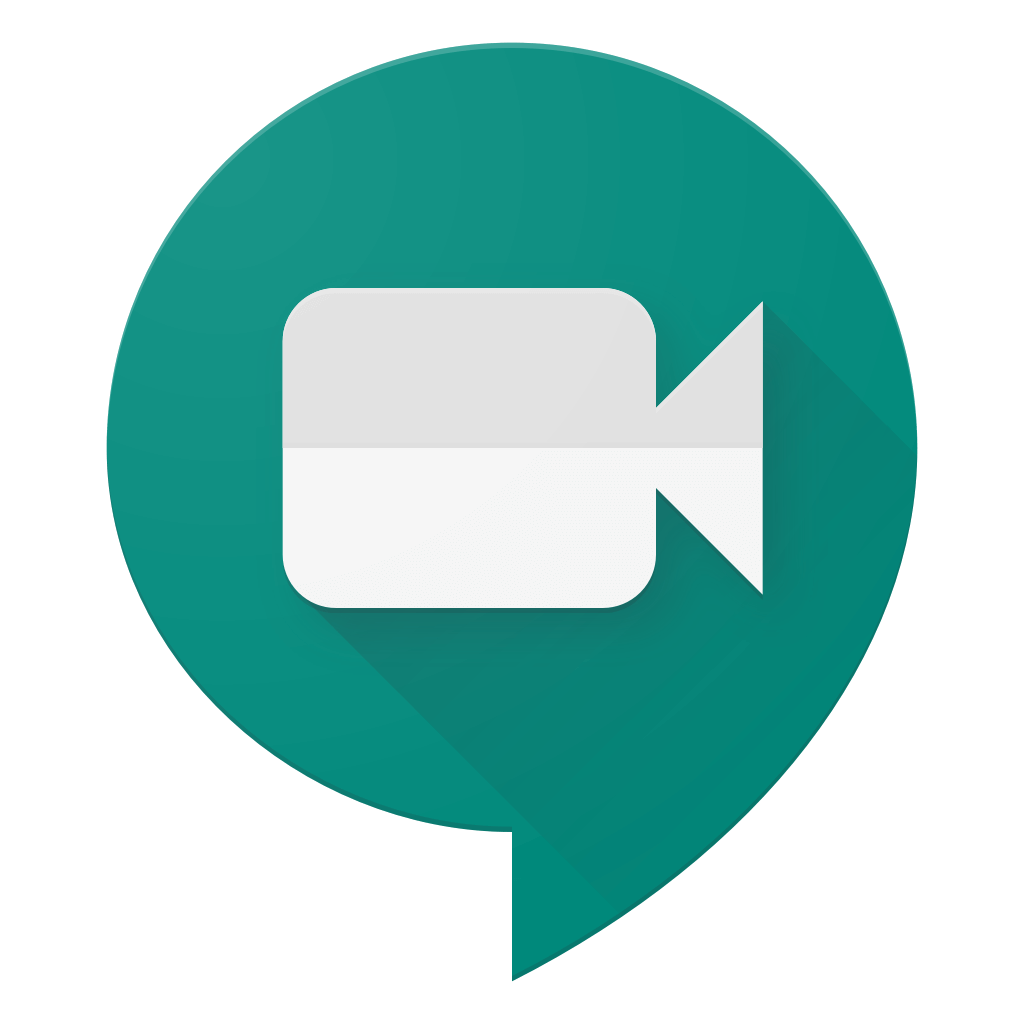
Icon used from March 2017 to October 2020

After being invite-only and quietly releasing an iOS app in February 2017, Google formally launched Meet in March 2017. The service was unveiled as a video conferencing app for up to 30 participants, described as an enterprise-friendly version of Hangouts. It was available through applications for desktop, Android, and iOS.

While Google Meet introduced the above features to upgrade the original Hangouts application, some standard Hangouts features were deprecated, including viewing attendees and chat simultaneously. The number of video feeds allowed at one time was also reduced to 8 (while up to 4 feeds can be shown in the "tiles" layout), prioritizing those attendees who most recently used their microphone. Additionally, features such as the chatbox were changed to overlay the video feeds, rather than resizing the latter to fit. During the COVID-19 pandemic in 2020, Google suspended its usual 60-minute limit for unpaid accounts, extending unlimited call durations until March 2021. On November 1, 2022, Hangouts was officially converted and no longer available.

In August 2020, it was reported that Google was planning to eventually merge Google Duo with the business-oriented Google Meet. In December 2021, this objective had been dropped, but Duo continued to be available and updated. In June 2022, Google reversed course and announced that Duo would, in fact, be merged into Meet. The merger began in August, with the Duo mobile app being renamed Meet. The Google Duo web app now also redirects to the Google Meet web app. The original Meet app is intended to be phased out over the next months. Google Meet Legacy (Duo) calling will be discontinued in September 2025.

== Platforms ==
Google Meet is available to Android and iOS devices, as well a web application. Compatibility with Android TV was launched in 2022, replacing Google Duo app, with the support for making calls but without the ability to create or join meetings. It later gained compatibility with Samsung Smart TVs on October 18, 2022, but was discontinued on March 9, 2024.

== Features ==
Features of Google Meet include:

- Two-way and multi-way audio-video calls
- Video resolution up to 720p or 1080p, depending on the license
- An accompanying chat
- Call encryption between all users
- Noise-canceling audio filter (depending on the license)
- Low-light video filter
- Call features: shared whiteboard, reactions, polls, voting, Q&A (depending on the license)
- Google document sharing (documents, spreadsheets, presentations)
- Screen-sharing, browser tab sharing
- Team activities – shared YouTube and Spotify watching, playing mini games like UNO! Mobile, Kahoot! and Heads Up!
- Integration with Google ecosystem, including Google Calendar and Google Contacts for one-click meeting calls
- A live preview of the caller before the recipient picks up, which Google says is to "make calls feel more like an invitation rather than an interruption".
- Ability to call into meetings using a dial-in number (US numbers always; international numbers when included in Workspace license)
- Hosts being able to deny a user's entry to, remove a user from, and control microphone and video access in a call.
- Video filters, effects, backgrounds and augmented reality masks.
- Ability to join meetings through a web browser or through Android or iOS apps

=== Google Workspace accounts ===
Features for users who use Google Workspace accounts include:

- Up to 100 members per call for Google Workspace Starter users, up to 150 for Google Workspace Business users, and up to 250 for Google Workspace Enterprise users.
- Ability to call into meetings with a dial-in number from selected countries.
- Ability to record the meeting.
- Password-protected dial-in numbers for Google Workspace Enterprise edition users.
- Real-time closed captioning based on speech recognition.
- Background blurring and virtual backgrounds.
- Real-time translations of the automatically generated closed captions

In March 2020, Google temporarily extended advanced features present in the enterprise edition to anyone using Google Workspace or G Suite for Education editions. In January 2022, these features were removed for educators and workspace users unless they subscribed.

=== Personal accounts ===
In March 2020, Google rolled out Meet to personal (free) Google accounts.

Free Meet calls can only have a single host and up to 100 participants, compared to the 250-caller limit for Google Workspace users and the 25-participant limit for Hangouts. Unlike business calls with Meet, consumer calls are not recorded and stored, and Google states that consumer data from Meet will not be used for advertisement targeting. While call data is reportedly not being used for advertising purposes, based on an analysis of Meet's privacy policy, Google reserves the right to collect data on call duration, who is participating, and participants' IP addresses.

Users need a Google account to initiate calls and like Google Workspace users, anyone with a Google account is able to start a Meet call from within Gmail.

== Technologies ==
In accordance with the WebRTC standard, Google Meet uses the VP9 video codec for video stream compression and Opus audio codec for voice stream compression. In April 2020, Google announced plans to support the AV1 video codec. In February 2021, Google announced a new very low-bitrate codec for speech compression called "Lyra", that can operate with network speeds as low as 3 kbit/s that avoids robotic voice audio. Google trained machine learning models on thousands of hours of data in order to create the method used by Lyra on compression and transmission of voice signals.

Google Meet uses proprietary protocols for audio and video stream control. Interoperability between Google Meet and SIP/H.323-based conferencing equipment and software is available for Google Workspace customers through third-party services.

Google Meet is optimized for low-bandwidth mobile networks through WebRTC and uses QUIC over UDP. Optimization is further achieved through the degradation of video quality through monitoring network quality. For packet loss concealment Meet uses WaveNetEQ.

== Hardware ==
In May 2020, Asus unveiled videoconferencing hardware designed for use with Google Meet in conference room settings, which includes a "Meet Compute System" mini PC, and a dedicated camera and microphone.

On September 15, 2020, Google unveiled Meet Series One, in partnership with Lenovo, which includes a Meet Compute System with Edge TPU, "Smart Camera", "Smart Audio Bar" with noise reduction, and a choice of remote control or touchscreen that supports the Google Assistant.

== See also ==
- Microsoft Teams
- StreamYard
