= Google Spaces =

Discontinued mobile app for group discussions and messaging developed by Google

Spaces
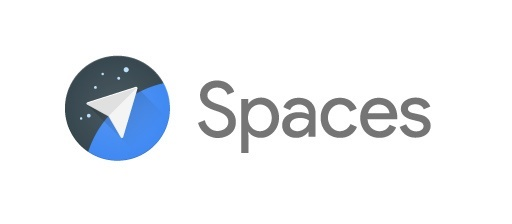
- Logo
- Developer: Google
- Release: May 16, 2016; 10 years ago
- Operating system: Windows, Mac, Android, iOS
- Successor: Spaces in Google Chat
- Type: Instant messaging
- Website: spaces.google.com

Google Spaces was a mobile app for group discussions and messaging developed by Google. The app was intended to compete with Slack as a content sharing platform where users can create a "space", invite their friends for discussion, and share videos, images, text, and other media. Google services such as the web browser Chrome, search engine Google Search, and video sharing platform YouTube were built into the app to allow users to source content from them. Google Spaces launched on May 16, 2016, available on Windows, Mac, Android, and iOS operating systems. The app was discontinued on April 17, 2017. The Spaces brand name was revived for a feature in Google Chat, formerly named Rooms.

== History ==
On May 16, 2016, product director Luke Wroblewski announced the launch of Spaces as "a tool for small group sharing".

On February 16, 2017, Google announced Spaces would be discontinued on April 17. On March 3, Google announced that users could only print, view and delete existing spaces within the app, users could no longer create new spaces.

== Features ==
Spaces allowed group chatting and messaging between users. Users initiated conversations by creating a 'space' and then inviting friends to join. Once inside a 'space', there was a box at the bottom of the screen where one could tap buttons to post links and images and other content to the chat room. A conversational view let users see what the group was talking about.

Google products such as Google Chrome, Google Search, and YouTube were in built into the app to allow users to find and share articles, videos, and images without leaving the app. It required a Google account to sign up.

The following were the types of posts that a user could share in a "space":

- Links – URLs of media which are automatically embedded
- Videos – YouTube videos were integrated for mobile users; however, desktop users could directly search in the YouTube database as well as see their recently watched videos
- Photos – With support for multiple-image uploads, users could directly post through their camera roll or through Google Photos
- Text – Plain text, without formatting support
