= List of defunct instant messaging platforms =

This is an alphabetical list of defunct instant messaging platforms.

Brand	Developer(s)	Launched	Discontinued	Lifespan (years)
AIM	AOL	1997	2017	20
aMSN	Microsoft	2002	2012	10
BBM	BlackBerry Ltd.	2005	2019	14
BBMe for Personal Use	BlackBerry Ltd.	2019	2024	5
Beeper Mini	Automattic	2023	2024	1
ChatON	Samsung Electronics	2011	2015	4
Empathy	Guillaume Desmottes, Xavier Claessens	2007	2017	10
Fetion	China Mobile	2007	2022	15
FireChat	Open Garden	2014	2018	4
Gizmo5	Google	2005	2011	6
Google Talk	Google	2005	2015	10
Google Allo	Google	2016	2019	3
Google Hangouts	Google	2013	2022	9
Guilded	Roblox Corporation	2017	2025	8
Hike Messenger	Hike Private Ltd.	2012	2021	9
HipChat	Atlassian	2009	2017	8
iChat	Apple	2002	2012	10
ICQ	Mirabilis	1996	2024	28
Instantbird	Florian Quèze	2007	2013	6
Meebo	Google	2005	2012	7
MessageMe	Yahoo!	2012	2014	3
Microsoft Kaizala	Microsoft	2017	2023	6
Microsoft Lync	Microsoft	2010	2015	5
Microsoft Messenger service	Microsoft	1999	2014	15
Microsoft Office Communicator	Microsoft	2007	2010	3
MSN Messenger	Microsoft	1999	2005 (Note: Rebranded as Windows Live Messenger)	6
Mxit	Mxit Ltd.	2005	2016	11
MySpaceIM	Myspace	2006	2009	2
Odigo Messenger	Comverse Technology	1999	2004	5
ooVoo	Krush Technologies, LLC	2007	2017	10
PowWow	Tribal Voice	1994	2001	7
QIP	RBK Group	2005	2012	7
Skype	Microsoft	2003	2025	22
Skype for Business	Microsoft	2015	2021	5
Skype Qik	Microsoft	2014	2016	2
Stride	Atlassian	2017	2019	2
Surespot	Surespot LLC	2012	2022	10
Upptalk	Simyo	2010	2017	7
Windows Live Messenger	Microsoft	2005	2012 (Note: 2014 in China)	7
Windows Messenger	Microsoft	2001	2008	7
Windows Messenger service	Microsoft	2000	2008	8
Xfire	Xfire, Inc.	2003	2015	12
Yahoo! Livetext	Yahoo!	2015	2016	1
Yahoo! Messenger	Yahoo!	1998	2018	20
