= Centericq =

Instant messaging interface

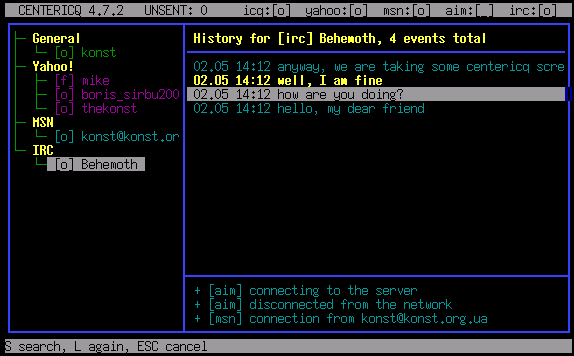
- IRC chat window
- Developer: Konstantin Klyagin
- Release: August 1, 1999; 27 years ago
- Final release: 4.21.0 (September 2, 2005; 21 years ago) [±]
- Written in: C++
- Operating system: Cross-platform
- Available in: bg, cs, de, en, es, fr, hu, it, ms, nl, pl, pt, ro, ru, sv, uk, zh
- Type: Instant messaging client
- License: GPL
- Website: thekonst.net/en/centericq

Centericq is a text mode menu- and window-driven instant messaging interface that supports the ICQ, Yahoo!, AIM, MSN, IRC, XMPP, LiveJournal, and Gadu-Gadu protocols.

== Overview ==
Centericq allows you to send, receive, and forward messages, URLs, SMSes (both through the ICQ server and email gateways supported by Mirabilis), contacts, and email express messages, and it has many other useful features. Known to work in Linux, FreeBSD, NetBSD, OpenBSD, Solaris, Windows and macOS/Darwin Operating Systems.

Its heyday was in the first half-decade of the 2000s, with reviews appearing in Softpedia, Czech online magazines ABC Linux and Linux.cz. It was recommended in a 2004 OSNews article on console applications, and in a similar article in the Russian magazine Computerra. Two tutorial articles appeared in the German magazine LinuxUser in 2001 and 2004; the latter article appeared in the English version of Linux Magazine. It was included in a 2002 round-up of ICQ clients in the Russian XAKEP magazine, and in a 2005 round-up review of IRC Clients in Free Software Magazine. The FSM reviewer noted Centericq for its windows-like interface built on top of the usual curses library, which provides much information, but can look cluttered on smaller terminal windows, including the standard 80 by 25 terminal. It found that IRC support was "excellent" due to support for multiple servers and channels and the ease of switching between them in the “windowed” interface. In September 2002, Steven J. Vaughan-Nichols found it "the greatest of all console IM clients" due to its "excellent interface and a huge number of features and configuration options" in a category review on Freshmeat. In 2005 it was reviewed in The Unofficial Apple Weblog; despite support for .mac accounts, the reviewer noted "annoying key combos" required to access the menus, because on Mac OS X the usual function key assignments of Centericq could not be used. Though he could not access the MSN network, he concluded: "All things considered, I've decided that Centericq is the most stable and intuitive terminal based chat client."

In August 2007, the project's (then) website stated that Centericq development was "dead", and that the website would be shut down in November 2007. The site referred users to the CenterIM fork of the project. The developers of the CenterIM fork applied several security patches and updates. As of 2009, CenterIM was still in development, with version 4.22.9 released on December 14. Neither CenterICQ nor CenterIM 4 support Unicode, but support for UTF-8 is planned for CenterIM 5.

== See also ==
- naim is another text-based messaging client with support for multiple protocols
- List of XMPP client software
- Comparison of instant messaging clients
