= Trillian (software) =

Instant messaging application

- Developer: Cerulean Studios
- Release: July 1, 2000; 26 years ago

Stable release(s)
- Android: 6.6.0.13 / 25 July 2023
- iOS: 6.6.77 / 13 September 2024
- Linux: 6.3.0.1 / 27 May 2020
- macOS: 6.6.0.18 / 20 November 2024
- Windows: 6.6.0.19 / 24 September 2026
- Web: 6.6.19 / 30 April 2024
- Written in: C++
- Operating system: Windows and later, MacOS, Linux, Android, iOS, and Web app
- Available in: English
- Type: Instant messaging client
- License: Freemium
- Website: www.trillian.im
- As of: 2021-02-11

Trillian is a proprietary multiprotocol instant messaging application created by Cerulean Studios. It is currently available for Microsoft Windows, macOS, Linux, Android, iOS, BlackBerry OS, and the Web. It can connect to multiple IM services, such as AIM, Bonjour, Facebook Messenger, Google Talk (Hangouts), IRC, XMPP (Jabber), VZ, and Yahoo! Messenger networks; as well as social networking sites, such as Facebook, Foursquare, LinkedIn, and Twitter; and email services, such as POP3 and IMAP.

Trillian no longer supports Windows Live Messenger or Skype as these services have combined and Microsoft chose to discontinue Skypekit, which was used for connection. They also no longer support connecting to MySpace, or a distinct connection for Gmail, Hotmail or Yahoo! Mail although these can still be connected to via POP3 or IMAP. Currently, Trillian supports Jabber (XMPP) and Olark.

Initially released July 1, 2000, as a freeware IRC client, the first commercial version (Trillian Pro 1.0) was published on September 10, 2002. The program was named after Trillian, a fictional character in The Hitchhiker's Guide to the Galaxy by Douglas Adams. A previous version of the official web site even had a tribute to Douglas Adams on its front page. On August 14, 2009, Trillian "Astra" (4.0) for Windows was released, along with its own Astra network. Trillian 5 for Windows was released in May 2011, and Trillian 6.0 was initially released in February 2017.

== Features ==
=== Connection to multiple IM services ===
Trillian connects to multiple instant messaging services without the need of running multiple clients. Users can create multiple connections to the same service, and can also group connections under separate identities to prevent confusion. All contacts are gathered under the same contact list. Contacts are not bound to their own IM service groups, and can be dragged and dropped freely. Trillian represents each service with a different-colored sphere. Prior versions used the corporate logos for each service, but these were removed to avoid copyright issues, although some skins still use the original icons. The Trillian designers chose a color-coding scheme based on the underground maps used by the London Underground that uses different colors to differentiate between different lines.

==== IM services ====
- Green And Blue for Trillian Astra Network
- Grey for IRC
- Amber and Dark Gray for Bonjour (Rendezvous)
- Purple for Jabber/XMPP (partially broken as of 10/27/2017)
- Teal and Amber for Google Talk (discontinued as of 2022)
- Blue And Teal for Facebook (discontinued as of 2022)
- Blue for MSN Messenger (discontinued as of 2013)
- Green for ICQ (discontinued as of 2017)
- Amber for AOL Instant Messenger (discontinued as of 2017)

==== Mail services ====
- White envelope for POP emails
- Manila envelope for IMAP emails
- Teal envelope for Twitter

Prior versions of Trillian supported:

- Microsoft Exchange
- Lotus Sametime
- Novell GroupWise Messenger

=== Metacontact ===
To eliminate duplicates and simplify the structure of the contact list, users can bundle multiple contact entries for the same person into one entry in the contact list, using the Metacontact feature (similarly to Ayttm's fallback messaging feature). Subcontacts will appear under the metacontact as small icons aligned in the form of a tree.

=== Activity history ===
Trillian Pro comes with Activity History, and both log the history as both plain text files and as XML files. Pro has a History Manager that shows the chat history and allows the user to add bookmarks for revision later on. XML-based history makes the log easy to manipulate, searchable and extendable for future functions.

=== Stream manipulation ===
Trillian Pro also has a stream manipulation feature labelled 'time travel', which allows the user to record and subsequently review, pause, rewind, and fast-forward live video and audio sessions.

=== SecureIM ===
SecureIM is an encryption system built into the Trillian Instant Messenger Client.

It encrypts messages from user to user, so no passively observing node between the two is supposedly able to read the encrypted messages. SecureIM does not authenticate its messages, and therefore it is susceptible to active attacks including simple forms of man-in-the-middle attacks.

According to Cerulean Studios, the makers of Trillian, SecureIM enciphers messages with 128-bit Blowfish encryption. It only works with the OSCAR protocol and if both chat partners use Trillian.

However, the key used for encryption is established using a Diffie–Hellman key exchange which only uses a 128 bit prime number as modulus, which is extremely insecure and can be broken within minutes on a standard PC.

=== Instant lookup ===
Starting with version 3.0 in both the Basic and Pro suites, Trillian makes use of the English-language version of the Wikipedia free online encyclopedia for real-time referencing using its database of free knowledge. The feature is employed directly within a conversation window of a user. When one or more words are entered (by either user), Trillian checks all words against a database file and if a match is found, the word appears with a dotted green underline. When users point their mouse over the word, the lead paragraph of the corresponding article is downloaded from Wikipedia and displayed on screen as a tooltip. When users click on the underlined word, they are given the choice to visit the article online.

=== Emotiblips ===
Emotiblips are the video equivalent of an emoticon. During video sessions, the user may stream a song or video to the other user in real time. One can send MP3s, WAVs, WMVs, and MPGs with this feature. QuickTime MOV files as Emotiblips are not currently supported.

=== Hidden smileys ===
In version 2.0 to the current, the default emoticon set contains emoticons that do not appear in the menu but can be used in conversations. Some of these are animations that can only be viewed in Trillian Pro, but all of them can be used regardless.

=== Skins and interfaces (Discontinued) ===
Trillian has its own unique skinning engine known as SkinXML. Many skins have been developed for Trillian and they can be downloaded from the official skins gallery or deviantArt.

Trillian also came with an easier skinning language, Stixe, which is essentially a set of XML Entities that simplifies repetitive codes and allows skinners to share XML and graphics in the form of emoticon packs, sound packs and interfaces.

The default skins of Trillian are designed by Madelena Mak. Trillian Cordillera was used in Trillian 0.7x, while Trillian Whistler has been the default skin for Trillian since Pro 1.0. Small cosmetic changes were noticeable in each major release.

The Trillian Astra features a brand new design for the front-end UI, named Trillian Cordonata.

=== Plugins (Discontinued) ===
Trillian is a closed-source application, but the Pro version can be extended by plugins. Plugins by Cerulean Studios itself include spell-check, weather monitor, a mini-browser (for viewing AIM profiles), Winamp song title scroller, stock exchange monitor, RSS feedreader, and conversation abilities for the Logitech G15 keyboard, as well as a plug-in for the XMPP and Bonjour networks. Others have developed various plug-ins, such as a games plug-in which can be used to play chess and checkers, a protocol plugin to send NetBIOS messages through Trillian, a plug-in to interact with Lotus Sametime clients, a plug-in to interact with Microsoft Exchange, a POP3 and IMAP email checker, or an automatic translator for many European languages to and from English.

Trillian 5.1 for Windows and later included a plug-in that allows you to chat and make calls on Skype without Skype being installed. As of July 2014, Skype is no longer accessible from the Trillian client, as the Skype plug-in no longer works (some had been able to use older versions of the Trillian client, but now these also no longer work with Skype.)

Plugins are available for free and are hosted on the official web site, but most need Trillian Pro 2+ to run.

=== In-Game Chat ===
Starting at version 5.3, Trillian users can toggle an overlay when playing a video game on the computer that allows the user to use Trillian's chat features, in a similar vein to Steam's overlay chat. When toggled, the overlay will show the time according to the system's clock, and the chat window itself is a variation Trillian's base chat window, with tabs used for different sets of queries and channels. Also, when the overlay is not activated, users can view a toggle-able sticker that tells the user how many messages are unread.

== History ==
=== Early beginnings ===
After several internal builds, the first ever public release of Trillian, version 0.50, was available on July 1, 2000, and was designed to be an IRC client. The release was deemed 'too buggy' and was immediately pulled off the shelf and replaced by a new version 0.51 on the same day. It featured a simple Connection Manager and skinned windows.

A month later, two minor builds were released with additional IRC features and bug fixes. Despite these efforts, Trillian was not popular, as reflected in the number of downloads from CNET's Download.com.

Trillian was a donateware at that time. They used PayPal for receiving donations through their web site.

=== Introduction of interoperability ===
Version 0.6, released November 29, 2000, represented a major change in the direction of development, when the client became able to connect to AOL Instant Messenger, ICQ and MSN Messenger simultaneously in one window.

Although similar products, such as Odigo and Imici, already existed, Trillian was novel in the way that it distinguished contacts from different IM services clearly on the contact list, and it did not require registration of a proprietary account. It also did not lose connection easily like the other clients.

A month later, Yahoo! Messenger support was introduced in Trillian 0.61, and it also featured a holiday skin for Christmas. Meanwhile, the Trillian community forums were opened to the public.

During this period, new versions were released frequently, attracting many enthusiasts to the community. Skinning activity boomed and fan sites were created. A skinning contest was held on deviantArt in Summer, and the winner was selected to design the default skin for the next version of Trillian. Trillian hit 100,000 downloads on August 14, 2001.

=== Entry into mainstream and the "IM Wars" ===
Contrary to the anticipation for version "0.64" in the community, the next version of Trillian was numbered 0.70. It was released December 5, 2001. Development took five months, considerably longer than development of prior builds.

The new version implemented file transfer in all IM services, a feature most requested by the community at the time. It also represented a number of skin language changes. It used the contact list as the main window (as opposed to a status window 'container' in prior versions) and featured a brand new default skin, Trillian Cordillera, and an emoticon set boasting over 100 emoticons, setting a record apart from other messengers available at that time.

Version 0.71 was released on December 18, 2001. It supported AIM group chats and was the first major IM client which included the ability to encrypt messages with SecureIM.

In the following months, the number of downloads of Trillian surged, reaching 1 million on 27 January 2002, and 5 million within 6 months. Trillian received coverage and favorable reviews from mainstream media worldwide, particularly by CNET, Wired and BetaNews. The lead developer and co-founder, Scott Werndorfer, was also interviewed on TechTV.

AOL became aware that Trillian users were able to chat with their AIM buddies without having to download the AIM client, and on January 28, 2002, AOL blocked SecureIM access from Trillian clients. Cerulean appeared to have circumvented the block with version 0.721 of its client software, released one day later. This "AOL War" continued for the next couple of weeks, with Cerulean releasing subsequent patches 0.722, 0.723 and 0.724.

Trillian appeared in the Jupiter Media Metrix Internet audience ratings in February 2002 with 344,000 unique users, and grew to 610,000 by April 2002. While those numbers are very small compared to the major IM networks, Jupiter said Trillian consistently ranks highest according to the number of average minutes spent per month.

Trillian also created a special version for Iomega ActiveDisk.

=== Commercialisation with Trillian Pro ===
On September 9, 2002, a commercial version, Trillian Pro 1.0, was released concurrently with Trillian Basic 0.74. The commercial version was sold for $25 US for a year of subscription, but all those who donated to the development of Trillian before were eligible to a year of subscription at no cost.

The new version had added SMS and mobile messaging abilities, Yahoo! Messenger webcam support, pop-up e-mail alerts and new plug-ins to shuttle news, weather and stock quotes directly to buddy lists.

It appeared Trillian Pro would be marketed to corporate clients looking to keep in touch with suppliers or customers via a secured, interoperable IM network, and a relatively stern user interface. The company had no venture capital backing, and had depended entirely on donations from users to stay alive.

Trillian Pro 1.0 was nominated and picked among three other nominees as the Best Internet Communication shareware in its debut year of being a "try before you buy" shareware.

On April 26, 2003, total downloads of Trillian reached ten million.

=== Blocking from Yahoo! and cooperation with Gaim ===
A few weeks after Trillian Pro 2.0 was released, Yahoo! attempted to block Trillian from connecting to its service in their "efforts to implement preventative measures to protect our users from potential spammers." A few patches were released by the Trillian developers, which resolved the issue.

The Trillian developers assisted its open-source cross-platform rival Gaim in solving the Yahoo! connection issues. Sean Egan, the developer of Gaim, posted in its site, "Our friends over at Cerulean Studios managed to break my speed record at cracking Yahoo! authentication schemes with an impressive feat of hackery. They sent it over and here it is in Gaim 0.70." It was later revealed that the developers were friends and had helped each other on past occasions.

Meanwhile, as Microsoft forced its users to upgrade to MSN Messenger 5.0 for upgrades in their servers for security issues, October 15, 2003 also would mark the deadline for Trillian support for MSN Messenger. However, it appeared that Cerulean Studios worked with Microsoft to resolve the issue on August 2, 2003, long before the deadline.

On March 7, 2004, and June 23, 2004, Yahoo! changed its instant messaging language again to prevent third-party services, such as Trillian, from accessing its service. Like prior statements, the company said the block is meant as a pre-emptive measure against spammers. Cerulean Studios released a few patches to fix the issues within a day or two.

=== Trillian 3 Series ===
In August 2004, a new official blog was created in attempt to rebuild connections between the Studios and its customers. Trillian 3 was announced in the blog, and a sneak preview was made available to a small group of testers.

After months of beta-testing, the final build of Trillian 3 was released on December 18, 2004, with features such as new video and audio chat abilities throughout AIM, MSN Messenger and Yahoo! Messenger, an enhanced logging manager and integration with the Wikipedia online encyclopedia. It also featured a clean and re-organized user interface and a brand new official web site.

The release also updated the long-abandoned Trillian Basic .74 to match the new user interface and functionalities as Trillian Basic 3.0. The number of accumulated downloads of Trillian Basic in Download.com hit 20 million within a matter of weeks.

Trillian 3.1 was released February 23, 2005. It included new features such as Universal Plug and Play (UPnP) and multiple identities support.

On June 10, 2011, all instances of Trillian 3 Basic got an automatic upgrade to Trillian 3 Pro, free of charge.

=== U3 and Google Pack ===
A version of Trillian that could run on U3 USB flash drives was released on October 21, 2005. Trillian could previously be run from generic flash drives or other storage devices with some minor unofficial modifications, known as "Trillian Anywhere". A U3 version of Trillian Astra is also posted on the official Cerulean Studios forum.

On January 6, 2006, Larry Page, President of Products at Google, announced Google Pack, a bundle of various applications including Trillian Basic 3.0 as "a free collection of safe, useful software from Google and other companies that improves the user experience online and on the desktop".

According to the Cerulean Studios blog, Trillian was discontinued from Google Pack on 19 May 2006.

The inclusion of Trillian in Google Pack was perplexing to some media analysts as Google had at the time its own Google Talk service which touted the benefits of an open IM system. The free Trillian Basic client could not be used with Google Talk, however, the paid Trillian Pro was listed as one of the "client choices" in the Google Talk client choices list until Google Talk was replaced by Google Hangouts in May 2013.

=== Trillian Astra (Trillian 4) ===
More than a year after the release of Trillian 3.1, the Cerulean Studios blog began spreading news again and announced the next version of Trillian, to be named Trillian Astra. The name for version 4, Astra, is the nickname used by the same fictional character that is the namesake of the software, which is a reference to The Hitchhiker's Guide to the Galaxy. The new release claimed to be faster and include a new login screen. A new domain, www.trillianastra.com, was disclosed to the public, with only the logo and blue background. On July 3, 2009, Cerulean Studios reopened the premium web version of Astra to public testing. On August 14, 2009, Cerulean Studios released the final gold build. Trillian has its own social network named Astra Network, in which users who have Astra ID can communicate with each other on the network regardless of platform. Cerulean Studios later registered a new domain, www.trillian.im, to provide a more user-friendly experience.

On November 18, 2009, the first mobile version of Trillian was launched for iPhone. As of 2010, final builds for Android, BlackBerry, and Apple iOS were available for their markets (Market, App World and App Store respectively). Trillian initially cost US$4.99 but became free of charge, supported by ads, in 2011.

As of August 2010, the Mac OS X version was in beta testing.

=== Trillian 5 ===
On August 2, 2010, Trillian 5.0 was released as a public beta. Newer features included a resize-able interface, History synchronization, a new ribbon inspired interface with Windows theme integration, new "marble-like" icons for service providers, the option to revert to the Trillian 3 & 4 interfaces, and a new social network interface window were introduced. Along with Trillian 5.0 For Windows and the aforementioned Mac beta. As of 2010, the Android and BlackBerry OS final builds were available on their respective markets for free.

==== OpenCandy ====
Included with the installation of Trillian 5.0 was a program called OpenCandy, which some security programs, including Microsoft Security Essentials, classed as adware. OpenCandy was removed shortly after on May 5, 2011.

=== Trillian 6 ===
On January 8, 2016, Trillian 6 was released.

=== Loss of networks ===
Trillian has stopped attempting to work around the systems to make their client work with other networks. They have also not done any development to integrate support for any of the newer networks. Instead they urge people to use their own IM service instead.

- As Yahoo! has decided to shut down the legacy Yahoo Messenger clients and servers, Trillian and all other clients are no longer able to connect to Yahoo! Messenger as of August 31, 2016.
- As AOL has decided to shut down the AIM network, Trillian, and all other clients are no longer able to connect to AIM as of December 15, 2017.
- As ICQ has decided to disable support for third party IM clients, Trillian is no longer able to connect to ICQ as of April 1, 2019. The ICQ service was shut down on June 26, 2024.
- MSN IM accounts were also able to be used as Skype accounts, when Microsoft Acquired Skype in 2011, but could still use the service at that time. The service was shut down in 2013.
- As (Microsoft) Skype has decided to disable support for third party IM clients, Trillian is no longer able to connect to Skype in 2013.
- As Google Talk has shut down, Trillian is no longer able to connect to the service, as of June 16, 2022.

== See also ==
- List of XMPP clients
- Comparison of instant messaging clients
- Comparison of IRC clients
- Comparison of instant messaging protocols
