= Kopete =

Free multiprotocol messenger

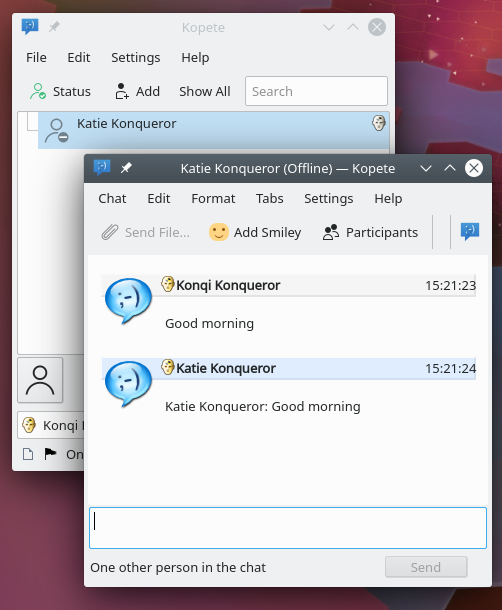
- Developer: KDE
- Stable release: 23.08.5 / 15 February 2024
- Written in: C++ (Qt)
- Operating system: Unix-like, Windows (The Windows version may not be the final version suitable for everyday use.)
- Type: Instant messaging client
- License: GPL-2.0-or-later
- Website: www.kopete.net
- Repository: invent.kde.org/network/kopete

Kopete was a multi-protocol, free software instant messaging client released as part of the KDE Software Compilation. Although it can run in numerous environments, it was designed for and integrates with the KDE Plasma Workspaces. Kopete was started because ICQ blocked Licq from their network in 2001. According to the original author, Duncan Mac-Vicar Prett, the name comes from the Chilean Spanish word copete, meaning "a drink with your friends". Kopete has been nominated for multiple awards. The designated successor is KDE Telepathy from the KDE RTCC Initiative.

== Protocols ==
Kopete allows users to connect to the following protocols:

- Gadu-Gadu
- Lotus Sametime (Note: Available via the standalone Meanwhile plugin.)
- Windows Messenger service
- Novell GroupWise
- OSCAR (including AIM and ICQ)
- QQ
- Skype (Note: Works only with dynamic linked Skype version 2.0/2.1 running alongside Kopete.)
- SMS
- Xfire (Note: Available via the standalone kopete-xfire Archived 2016-01-19 at the Wayback Machine plugin.)
- XMPP/Jingle (including Facebook Messenger and Google Talk)
- YMSG (including Yahoo! Messenger)

MSNP (Microsoft Messenger service, commonly known as MSN, .NET, or Live) was also supported until the protocol was discontinued by Microsoft.

== Features ==
- Grouping messages within a window, with tabs for easy switching of conversations
- Ability to use multiple accounts on multiple services
- Alias nicknames for contacts
- Contact grouping
- Custom notifications for contacts
- KAddressBook and KMail integration
- Conversation logging
- Custom emoticons
- Custom notifications, including popups and sounds
- QQ and Yahoo! messenger webcam support
- On-the-fly spell checking
- Voice call via GoogleTalk and Skype

== Plugins ==
By default, Kopete supports the following plugins (not all of which are currently functional):

- Auto Replace
- Connection Status
- Contact Notes
- Cryptography
- Highlight
- History
- KopeteTeX
- Motion Auto-Away
- Now Listening
- Statistics
- Text Effect
- Translator (no longer functional since the closure of both the Google Translate API and BabelFish)
- Web Presence

With third-party plugins, Kopete supports:

- Off-the-Record Messaging enabling for encrypted conversations with deniable authentication and perfect forward secrecy.
- Antispam by asking a simple question to unknown contacts.
- OpenPGP cryptography is available from the Debian package kopete-cryptography.

== See also ==
- Comparison of instant messaging clients
- Comparison of instant messaging protocols
- Comparison of Internet Relay Chat clients
- Konversation
