= Naim (software) =

Messaging and chat program

naim
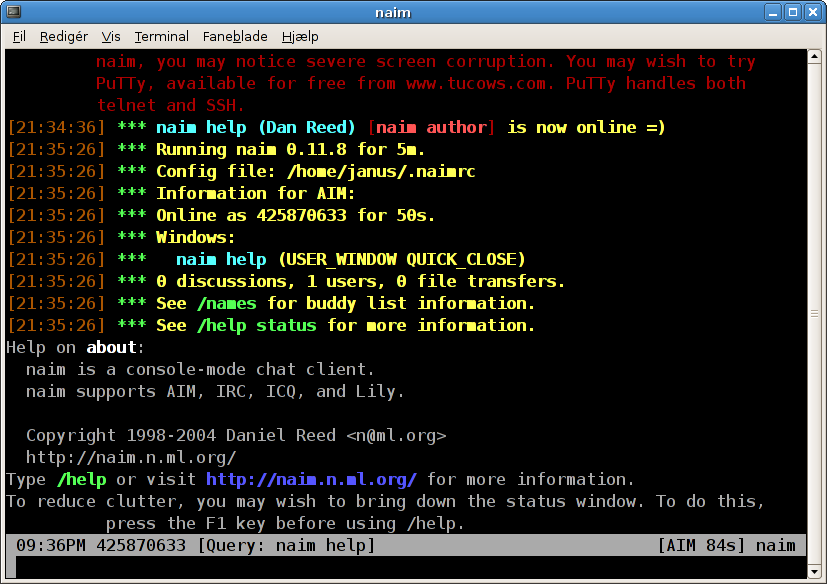
- Stable release: 0.11.8.3.2 / 1 March 2009
- Written in: C
- License: GPL-2.0-only
- Website: naim.n.ml.org

naim is a messaging and chat program written by Daniel Reed in C; it supports the protocols AIM, ICQ, IRC, and RPI's Lily CMC protocols. Unlike most messaging clients, it is not graphical; it runs from the console using the ncurses library. naim is free software, licensed under the GNU GPL.

naim is a multiplatform program. It is primarily aimed at Unix-like systems.

naim uses the AOL instant messenger TOC protocol instead of the OSCAR protocol. This means naim lacks some features other instant messaging services have.
