= Ayttm =

Instant messaging client

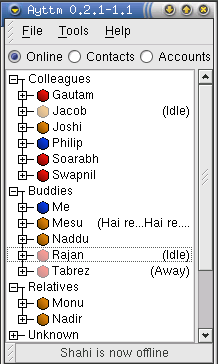
- Ayttm 0.2.1-1.1 main window/contacts list on Gnome
- Developers: Colin Leroy, Andy S. Maloney, Philip Tellis, Edward L. Haletky, Tahir Hashmi, Torrey Searle, Siddhesh Poyarekar
- Stable release: 0.6.3 / July 10, 2010; 16 years ago
- Written in: C, C++
- Operating system: Cross-platform
- Type: Instant messaging client
- Licence: GPL
- Website: ayttm.sourceforge.net

Ayttm (pronounced "item" or "A-Y-T-T-M") is a multi-protocol instant messaging client. It is the heir of the EveryBuddy project.

== Features ==
=== Services ===
Ayttm primarily supports one-to-one and group chatting on MSN, Yahoo!, ICQ, AIM, XMPP and IRC. It also has support for sending rudimentary emails via SMTP, which may be used to send SMS via email to SMS gateways. Ayttm also supports webcams on Yahoo! Messenger, and voice chatting over MSN using Ekiga (formerly GnomeMeeting).

Service summary:

- OSCAR (AIM/ICQ)
- IRC
- XMPP
- SMTP (SMS via email to SMS gateway)
- MSNP (Microsoft Messenger service, commonly known as MSN, .NET, or Live)
- YMSG (YIM with webcam support)

=== Fallback messaging ===
When contacts belonging to the same person - but in different protocols - are grouped together, Ayttm can automatically continue the conversation using another protocol, when the original protocol connection fails. It is known as fallback messaging to its developers.

=== Autotranslation ===
When a contact is tied to a particular language, messages can be automatically translated using Babelfish. As with most electronic translators, its accuracy can be dubious.

=== Aycryption ===
Aycryption is a filter that facilitates encrypted chat using GPG keys. All outgoing text is encrypted using the remote contact's public key, and incoming encrypted text is decrypted using the local private key.

=== Plugins ===
Ayttm's plugin architecture makes it possible for new protocol support to be added without modifying the core application. Plugins must be compiled against a version of the core and will only work with core versions that are binary-compatible with the core version that the plugin was built against.

Five types of plugins are supported:

- Service plugins - for protocol support. e.g.: MSN.
- Filter plugins - to modify incoming and outgoing messages. e.g.: Auto translation, aycryption
- Importers - to import contacts and accounts from other messengers.
- Smileys - a smiley pack
- Utility - to add functionality. e.g.: Video capture, notes.

== History ==
Towards the end of 2002, the everybuddy project started to stagnate and suffered from two major problems: Instability and a complicated set of preferences. The development team split into two to fix the problem. One group, led by Meredydd Luff started on a rewrite that was to be the long-term solution. This resulted in the eb-lite project. The other group led by Colin Leroy decided to fix all of the primary issues of everybuddy and work on features only after stabilising the core. The result was Ayttm.

Ayttm first made it into savannah's CVS repository on December 21, 2002, and almost daily developer releases were made: It was first announced on Freshmeat on December 27, 2002.

On March 31, 2003, citing availability issues with Savannah, the project was moved to SourceForge where it remains to date. Version 0.2.2 of Ayttm was released on April 1, 2003.

The latest release of Ayttm is 0.6.3 and was made on July 10, 2010.

== The name ==
"Yattm" was originally to be the name, but was misspelt by Colin Leroy when he registered the project on Savannah. The CVS log on Savannah shows that the executable name was changed from "yattm" to "ayttm" on January 16, 2003. No expansion for Ayttm was provided at this time. Several expansions of the name were attempted, and the one settled on was "Are You Talking To Me?". The question mark is part of the name. The name Ayttm is a backronym and credit for coining this term goes to Natasha Sharma.

== Platforms ==
It runs on:

- Linux
- FreeBSD, NetBSD, OpenBSD
- Microsoft Windows
- Mac OS X

Several ports use the GTK+ graphical widget toolkit.

== Copyright & Licence ==
The software is licensed under the terms of the GNU General Public License and is Copyright the Ayttm team.

== See also ==
- List of XMPP client software
- Comparison of instant messaging clients
