= StICQ =

stICQ is an ICQ client for mobile phones with symbian OS.

StICQ was written by the Russian programmer Sergey Taldykin. StICQ is a native Symbian application (.SIS) for instant messaging over Internet for the ICQ network (using the OSCAR protocol).

It supports all main statuses including "Not Available", "Invisible" etc., contact search using ICQ UID, black lists, multi-user support, sound announcements and even SMS sending using default ICQ server.

Its features are its small size, low memory usage and relatively stable work. One of the key features of the client is its ability to suspend outcoming data until GPRS coverage is available. It also suspend the status of the user, while all other mobile clients usually report connection problem and drop the user out.

Currently, stICQ does not support smiley pictures but have a unique feature of quick emoticon input using the call button (special plugin required).

Notable, stICQ supports the yellow "Ready to chat" extended status while "Depressive", as well as "At home", "At work" etc. are displayed as "Offline". This caused to call stICQ an "anti-depressive ICQ".

The source code has been sold to the development team of Quiet Internet Pager messenger. 1.01 version QiP for Symbian has been released recently.

StICQ is free for download, as are a wide variety of mods changing status icons and menu text.

== Keypad shortcuts ==
- Pressing asterisk in a contact list window allows you to maximize the program window. It will also affect message windows.
- Pressing the green button allows the smiley templates to be inserted by downloading and installing the templates file (stICQ.tpl).

== Known bugs ==
- StICQ is known to drop out when receiving large amounts of text in one message. Thus, users should beware their interlocutor of sending messages that exceeds 10-15 phone display lines.
- When using StICQ with a T9 dictionary, users should press any cursor key to get rid of "Previous" command for right button after sending a message or the program will crash.
- StICQ does not send the contact list to the server, so any changes in StICQ's list will not affect the main contact list.
