= BitlBee =

Open-source cross-platform IRC gateway

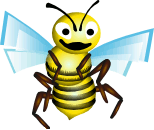

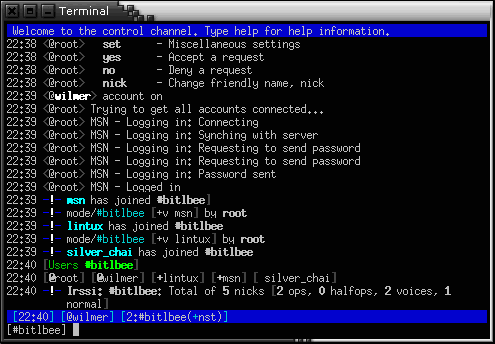
- Screenshot of Irssi IRC client connected to a BitlBee server to communicate via Windows Live
- Developer(s): BitlBee team, with Wilmer van der Gaast as Lead Developer
- Initial release: 9 August 2002; 22 years ago
- Stable release: 3.6 / 7 February 2019
- Repository: github.com/bitlbee/bitlbee
- Written in: C
- Type: Instant messaging
- License: GPL-2.0-or-later
- Website: bitlbee.org

BitlBee is a cross-platform IRC instant messaging gateway, licensed under the terms of the GNU General Public License.

BitlBee communicates with the user via the IRC protocol, providing a gateway to popular chat networks such as AIM and ICQ (via OSCAR), Microsoft Messenger service (via MSNP), Yahoo! (via YMSG) and Facebook Messenger (via MQTT with a plugin) and the microblogging networks Twitter, Identi.ca, and GNU Social. Since version 3.0, BitlBee can be built to use the libpurple library, which supports file transfers on many IM networks, and supports GaduGadu, QQ and other less well-known protocols. Off-the-record messaging is supported by Bitlbee. It supports the display of remote user status using the IRC voice attribute: online users are shown with voice, away users are shown without. Many IRC commands such as /WHO and /QUERY are available, though the capabilities of the remote IM protocols limit which IRC commands will work.

It can be installed and operated on a user's personal computer, a local server, or accessed on public gateway servers. A user registers with the BitlBee server for future credentials storage. Service protocols are added along with their credentials; following this, the software will display the user's buddy list as normal IRC users in a channel. Conversations can be public, or use the private message facility of IRC.

BitlBee runs on Linux, Unix, BSD, Windows, AmigaOS and macOS.

== See also ==
- Comparison of instant messaging clients
