= EBuddy =

Instant messaging software

eBuddy
- Company type: Private
- Available in: Multilingual
- Headquarters: Amsterdam, Netherlands
- Founders: Paulo Taylor; Jan-Joost Rueb; Onno Bakker
- Services: Instant messaging
- Website: www.ebuddy.com
- Registration: Optional
- Launched: 2003; 23 years ago
- Current status: Active

eBuddy is a privately held Dutch software company that offers instant messaging services. As of 2011, eBuddy reported 100 million downloads. The company's flagship service is XMS, a proprietary cross-platform instant messaging service. After some changes of ownership, the company is now again owned by its original founders, Onno Bakker and Jan-Joost Rueb.

== Services ==
=== XMS ===
XMS is a proprietary cross platform instant messaging service. At one point, XMS was processing over 17 billion messages a month exchanged between more than 30 million unique users - 100,000 users were signing up daily and 1.5 billion banner ads sold on web. In a 2011 review, the head of the BerryReview team mentioned that the service has many features in common with other cross-platform messaging services. It does include some multimedia features: users can send images and videos and share their location. XMS is available for iOS, Android, BlackBerry, Nokia Series 40, and Windows Phone 7 devices. There is also a web-based client, called "Web XMS", for computer users.

==== Security ====
On November 4, 2014, eBuddy XMS scored 1 out of 7 points on the Electronic Frontier Foundation's secure messaging scorecard. eBuddy XMS received a point for encryption during transit but lost points because communications are not encrypted with a key the provider doesn't have access to (i.e. the communications are not end-to-end encrypted), users can't verify contacts' identities, past messages are not secure if the encryption keys are stolen (i.e. the service does not provide forward secrecy), the code is not open to independent review (i.e. the code is not open-source), the security design is not properly documented, and there has not been a recent independent security audit. AIM, BlackBerry Messenger, Hushmail, Kik Messenger, Skype, Viber, and Yahoo Messenger also scored 1 out of 7 points.

=== eBuddy Chat ===
eBuddy Chat was a line of multi-protocol instant messaging clients: it allowed users with Facebook Chat, MSN, Google Talk, Yahoo Messenger, ICQ and AOL accounts to chat free of charge in one aggregated interface. eBuddy Chat supported a Web interface and also supported iOS, Android, J2ME and mobile Web-enabled devices. In 2010, it was named one of the five finalists for "Best Mobile App" in the Mashable Awards.

With the move toward mobile, in 2013, the company announced that it was discontinuing development of its eBuddy Chat multi-protocol instant messaging clients.

== History ==
eBuddy was originally developed by Paulo Taylor. His idea was established as a consequence from a bet to develop MSN Messenger, as it was named in 2003, for a mobile phone. After several weeks he won the bet, and uploaded the application to a server. A web version was soon developed following users' demands. As user traffic spurred, Taylor decided to take the idea further. Originally backed by Prime Technology Ventures and Lowland Capital Partners and headquartered in Amsterdam, Netherlands, with offices in Singapore and San Francisco, United States., after a partnership with Japanese-based GREE, eBuddy was sold via an acqui-hire to Booking.com.

- On September 9, 2003, Taylor, together with two partners Jan-Joost Rueb and Onno Bakker, created EverywhereMSN.com.
- On June 1, 2006, e-Messenger was renamed to eBuddy.
- On October 26, 2006, eBuddy received $6.33M (€5M) in Series A funding.
- On May 2, 2008, eBuddy received $9.55M (€6.5M) in Series B funding.
- On March 17, 2011, eBuddy launched its proprietary instant messaging app XMS.
- On September 21, 2012, Japanese gaming company GREE acquired a minority stake in eBuddy.
- However, GREE decided to leave the European market in 2013.
- On December 4, 2013, Dutch online booking portal Booking.com bought eBuddy in an acqui-hire agreement

== See also ==
- Comparison of instant messaging clients
