= Odigo Messenger =

Defunct social networking service

Odigo
- Founder: Moshe Zilberstein
- Headquarters: Herzliya Pituah, Israel
- Area served: Worldwide
- Key people: Avner Ronen; Gabriel Matsliach
- Services: Instant messaging Social Network

Odigo Messenger was an early social networking service based on instant messaging. Odigo believed in connecting and forming friendships: members would "meet" if two or more visited the same web site simultaneously. Odigo Messenger allowed members to connect to other IM networks, such as ICQ, MSN Messenger, Yahoo! Messenger and AOL Instant Messenger.

Odigo was purchased for an estimated $20 million by the Israeli company Comverse Technology in 2002. Comverse leveraged Odigo server software for instant messaging solutions in cell phones. However, since Comverse had no real interest in maintaining a generic IM service, it eventually shut down the free service in 2004.

The service first became available in 1999 and carried multiple brands during a spell of affiliations with different web service providers.

The word Odigo comes from the Greek "οδηγώ" which means "I guide/lead/drive/steer".

== Odigo and the 9/11 investigation ==
Odigo reported that, two hours before the September 11, 2001 attacks, two of their employees who were working in an Odigo office in Herzliya Pituah, a city near Tel Aviv, received a hostile English electronic instant message non-specifically threatening them that a terrorist attack would happen. They did not mention this to their employer until after they heard reports of a terrorist attack in the United States on the news, after which they informed the company's management. One of Odigo's New York offices was then situated within a mile of the World Trade Center complex. However, the threatening message did not mention the location of an attack.

The company took the initiative in tracking down the originating IP address of the message, giving the information to the FBI, so that the FBI could track down the Internet service provider, and the actual sender of the original message. Using the "people-search" function, Odigo users can send anonymous messages anywhere in the world to other users, who they can find based on demographics or location. According to The Washington Post, the message declared "that some sort of attack was about to take place. The notes ended with an anti-Semitic slur. The messages said 'something big was going to happen in a certain amount of time'".

== See also ==
- September 11 attacks advance-knowledge conspiracy theories
