= TOC1 =

TOC1 may refer to:

- The TOC protocol, or Talk to OSCAR protocol, a computing protocol
- TOC1 (gene), a gene regulating the circadian rhythm in plants
