= Jimm =

Instant messaging client

- Original author: Manuel Linsmayer
- Developer: Jimm development team
- Initial release: 2004
- Stable release: 0.5.1 / 31 October 2006; 19 years ago
- Preview release: 0.7.100123 beta / 23 January 2010; 16 years ago
- Operating system: Cross-platform
- Platform: Java ME
- Available in: English, French, German, Czech, Russian, Belarusian
- Type: Instant messaging client
- License: GPL
- Website: www.jimm.org

Jimm is an alternative open-source instant messaging client for the ICQ network. It is written in Java ME and should work in most of mobile devices that follow MIDP specification.

Jimm is licensed under the terms of the GNU General Public License.

== History ==
Creator of Jimm is Manuel Linsmayer. In 2003 he released a client Mobicq. The client allows to view a list of contacts and exchange messages on a protocol OSCAR (ICQ v8).

In 2004 AOL banned the use of the name "Mobicq" because it contains a part belonging to company trademark "ICQ". At that time, client was able to display status, display information about user, play sounds and display messages in the chat. It was decided to rename Mobicq to Jimm. The name "Jimm" means "Java Instant Mobile Messenger".

== Jimm development team ==
- Manuel Linsmayer (founder of the Jimm project)
- Andreas "Rossi" Rossbacher
- Denis "ArtDen" Artemov
- Ivan "Rad1st" Mikitevich
