= HCL Sametime =

Instant messaging software

HCL Sametime Premium
- Developer: HCL Software
- Stable release: 12.0.3 / June 17, 2025; 10 months ago
- Operating system: Cross-platform
- Type: Instant messaging, web conferencing, unified communications online chat
- License: Proprietary
- Website: www.hcltechsw.com/wps/portal/products/sametime/home

HCL Sametime Premium (formerly IBM Sametime and IBM Lotus Sametime) is a client–server application and middleware platform that provides real-time, unified communications and collaboration for enterprises. Those capabilities include presence information, enterprise instant messaging, web conferencing, community collaboration, and telephony capabilities and integration. Currently it is developed and sold by HCL Software, a division of Indian company HCL Technologies, until 2019 by the Lotus Software division of IBM.

Because HCL Sametime is middleware, it supports enterprise software and business process integration (Communication Enabled Business Process), either through an HCL Sametime plugin or by surfacing HCL Sametime capabilities through third-party applications. HCL Sametime integrates with a wide variety of software, including Lotus collaboration products, Microsoft Office productivity software, and portal and Web applications.

== Features ==
HCL Sametime Premium Features:

HCL Sametime Premium (v12.0.3)

- Chat Read Receipts
- Mobile Chat Search
- Meeting Recording Transcripts
- Mobile Auto Status & Persistent Notifications
- Improved Guest User Experience
- Chat and Meetings Accessibility
- Enchanted and React Design Updates

HCL Sametime Premium (v12.0.2 FP2)

- Windows Non-containerized support

HCL Sametime Premium (v12.0.2 FP1)

- Sametime Connect and Notes Embedded Web | PWA support
- Web Improved Contact List
- Additional start group chat option
- Mobile Enhancements and Stability Improvements
- Notification when a meeting starts
- Sametime Connect and Notes Embedded authenticated photos
- Ability to set chat history displayed
- Browser Tab notification

HCL Sametime Premium (v12.0.2)

- New Sametime Admin Client
- Improved LTPA and LDAP integration
- Managed Chart Deployments
- Mongo Atlas Support
- K3s support
- Install prompt for PWA client
- Open-source Product Documentation
- Meeting Privacy Settings
- Meeting Complex Passwords
- Combined Chat and Meetings client
- Meeting attendees displayed on pre-join
- In-meeting Awareness
- Chat Reactions
- Chat Deletion

HCL Sametime Premium (v12.0.1 FP1)

- Red Hat OpenShift support
- Controlling meeting report generation
- Audio and Video setting improvements

HCL Sametime Premium (v12.0.1)

- HCL Sametime chat only support on Kubernetes
- MongoDB v6 support
- Podman support
- Safari browser support
- Meeting duration timer
- Network indicator added to meetings
- Improved Firefox browser experience
- Keyboard shortcuts
- Chat enhancements
- Chat interface improvements
- Web Chat contact list nickname support
- Sametime Client RTL (Bi-Di) language support
- Chat API (technical preview) updates
- Grafana dashboards for monitoring and statistics
- Push Proxy support
- Sametime Database Utility
- Outlook Calendar HCL Meetings Add-on updates

HCL Sametime Premium (v12.0)

- Company branding
- Virtual backgrounds
- Meeting reports and recordings
- Click to Call
- File transfer
- Pinned and muted chats
- Microphone Background noise detection
- Meeting modes
- Member management
- Waiting room
- Mobile client policy improvements
- Video layout enhancements

HCL Sametime Premium (v11.6 IF2)

- Apache Tomcat upgraded
- Open JDK updated
- APNS certificate renewed

HCL Sametime Premium (v11.6)

- New modern look
- HCL Verse and iNotes enabled for Persistent Chat
- Click to meet feature
- New Web Chat client modern look and features
- New Mobile clients on iOS and Android
- Persistent chat and multi-device support
- New features for administrators
- 64-bit Community Server
- Simplified Proxy Server install
- Stand-alone Sametime Community Mux install
- Support for APNS HTTP/2

HCL Sametime Premium (v11.5)

- Instant meetings & persistent chat
- Personal meeting rooms
- Multiple screen-share per meeting
- Moderator Controls
- Video meeting options
- Desktop App, Web & Mobile
- Meeting Recording
- Calendar integrations
- Livestreaming capability
- Secure data
- Flexible deployment (Cloud, on-premises or hybrid)
- Admin policies at the user, group and server level
- Inbound/outbound telephony support

Features - Previous Versions through 11.0:

HCL Sametime is a client–server enterprise application that includes the HCL Sametime Connect client for end-users and the HCL Sametime Server for control and administration. HCL Sametime (pre v11.5) comes in four levels of functionality:

HCL Sametime Limited Use (Old name HCL Sametime Entry) provides basic presence and instant messaging.

HCL Sametime Standard provides additional functionality to HCL Sametime Entry, including:

- rich presence including location awareness
- rich-media chat, including point-to-point Voice-over-IP (VoIP) and video chat, timestamps, emoticons, and chat histories
- group and multi-way chat
- web conferencing
- contact business cards
- interoperability with public IM networks via the HCL Sametime Gateway, including AOL Instant Messenger, Yahoo! Messenger, Google Talk and XMPP-based services.
- open APIs that allow integrations between HCL's own and other applications
- Sametime Audio/Video Services supports audio (e.g. G.722.1) and video codecs (e.g. H.264)

HCL Sametime Advanced provides additional real-time community collaboration and social networking functionality to HCL Sametime Standard, including:

- persistent chat rooms
- instant screen sharing
- geographic location services

HCL Sametime Unified Telephony provides additional telephony functionality to HCL Sametime Standard or HCL Sametime Advanced, including:

- telephony presence
- softphone
- click-to-call and click-to-conference
- incoming call management
- call control with live call transfer
- connectivity to, and integration of, multiple telephone systems - both IP private branch exchange (IP-PBX) and legacy time-division multiplexing (TDM) systems

HCL Sametime Gateway provides server-to-server interoperability between disparate communities with conversion services for different protocols, presence information awareness, and instant messaging. HCL Sametime Gateway connects HCL Sametime instant messaging cooperate communities with external communities, including external HCL Sametime, and public instant messaging communities, such as: AOL, AIM, ICQ, Yahoo, Google Talk, and XMPP. HCL Sametime Gateway replaces the Sametime Session Initiation Protocol (SIP) Gateway from earlier releases of HCL Sametime.

The HCL Sametime Gateway platform is based on IBM WebSphere Application Server, which provides failover, clustering, and scalability for the HCL Sametime Gateway deployment. The product is shipped with the following connectors: Virtual Places, SIP, and XMPP. More protocol connectors may be added.

== Platform support, APIs and application integration ==
Because HCL Sametime is middleware, it supports application and business process integration. When within the context of real-time communications, this is often referred to as Communications Enabled Business Processes. Sametime integrates in either of two ways:

1. by surfacing the application into an HCL Sametime plug-in
2. by surfacing HCL Sametime capabilities into the target application

Some examples of integration between HCL Sametime and applications include:

- HCL's products including HCL Notes, HCL Domino applications, HCL Connections, HCL Quickr
- Microsoft office-productivity software including Microsoft Office, Microsoft Outlook, and Microsoft SharePoint
- portal applications, including portals built with IBM WebSphere Portal
- web applications
- packaged enterprise applications
- embedded and client–server telephony applications

HCL Sametime Connect, the client component of HCL Sametime, is built on the Eclipse platform, allowing developers familiar with the framework to easily write plug-ins for HCL Sametime. It uses a proprietary protocol named Virtual Places, but also offers support for standard protocols, including Session Initiation Protocol (SIP), SIMPLE, T.120, XMPP, and H.323.

HCL Sametime Connect can run under Microsoft Windows, Linux, and macOS. Also available are a zero-download web client for Microsoft Internet Explorer, Mozilla Firefox and Apple Safari; mobile clients are also supported for Apple iPhone, Android, Microsoft Windows Mobile, RIM Blackberry, and Symbian. The HCL Sametime server runs on Microsoft Windows, IBM AIX, IBM i (formerly i5/OS), Linux and Solaris. Sametime can also be accessed using the free software Adium, Gaim, Pidgin, and Kopete clients.

== History ==
HCL Sametime became an IBM product in 1998 as the synthesis of technologies IBM acquired from two companies:

1. an American company called Databeam provided the architecture to host T.120 dataconferencing (for web messaging) and H.323 Multi-Media Conferencing
2. Ubique, an Israeli company whose Virtual Places Chat software technology (also known as VPBuddy) provided the "presence awareness" functionality that allows people to detect which of their contacts are online and available for messaging or conferencing

The Sametime v3.1 client was part of the standard platform loaded by the IBM Standard Software Installer (ISSI) for many years, enabling communications over the corporate intranet by hundreds of thousands of IBM employees. The next major release was the Sametime v7.5 client, built on the Eclipse (software) platform, enabling the use of the plug-in framework.

In 2008 Gartner positioned IBM for the first time as a "leader" in Gartner's Unified Communications Magic Quadrant.

== Version ==
Release	Date	Info
2.5	2001-09-04	Lotus Sametime 2.5 revealed
3.1	2003-07-15	IBM United States Software Announcement 203-174
6.5.1	2004-03-30	Sametime 6.5.1 is the "synchronized" release, able to run on Domino 6.5.1. Its full name was IBM Lotus Instant Messaging and Web Conferencing.
7.5	2006-08-22	IBM United States Software Announcement 206-209
7.5.1	2007-04-24	IBM United States Software Announcement 207-084
8.0	2007-11-27	Announcement Letter No. ZP07-0498
8.5	2009-12-22	
8.5.1	2010-08-04	
8.5.2	2011-05-18	IBM United States Software Announcement 211-165
9.0	2013-09-20	
9.0.1	2016-05-03	IBM United States Software Announcement 216-042
10.0	2019-06-14	IBM United States Software Announcement 219-296
11.0	2019-12-04	HCL's Global Launch of Domino v11, Connections 6.5 and Sametime v11
11.5	2020-11-10	Announcing HCL Sametime Premium: Secure Video Meetings & Persistent Chat at Significant Savings
11.6	05-27-2021	What's new in HCL Sametime 11.6
11.6 IF2	03-15-2022	HCL Sametime 11.6 IF2
12.0	2022-04-28	Announcing HCL Sametime Premium v12: Secure Video Meetings & Persistent Chat
12.0.1	2022-11-15	HCL Sametime and HCL Sametime Premium 12.0.1 Release Information
12.0.1 FP1	2023-03-29	HCL Sametime and HCL Sametime Premium 12.0.1 FP1 Release Notes
12.0.2	2023-12-07	HCL Sametime and HCL Sametime Premium 12.0.2 Release Notes
12.0.2 FP1	2024-08-20	HCL Sametime and HCL Sametime Premium 12.0.2 FP1 Release Notes
12.0.2 FP2	2024-12-12	HCL Sametime and HCL Sametime Premium 12.0.2 FP2 Release Notes
12.0.3	2025-06-17	HCL Sametime and HCL Sametime Premium 12.0.3 Release Notes
