= Quiet Internet Pager =

Third-party closed-source freeware multiprotocol IM client

QIP

- Screenshot Contact list window of QIP Infium running on Windows 7
- Developers: Russian Internet Solutions, LLC
- Initial release: 1 November 2005
- Stable release: QIP 2012 — version 4.0 (build 9373) (5 March 2014; 12 years ago); QIP 2010 — version 3.1 (build 6936) (9 December 2011; 14 years ago); QIP Infium — version 3.0 (build 9045 nightly build 9) (28 June 2011; 14 years ago); QIP 2005 (build 8097) (29 October 2010; 15 years ago)
- Written in: Delphi
- Operating system: Microsoft Windows
- Available in: QIP 2012 — [English, Russian, German, Slovak, Czech, Spanish, French, Portuguese (Brazilian), Kazakh, Ukrainian]; QIP 2010 — [English, Russian, German]; QIP Infium — [English, Russian, Czech, Slovak]; QIP 2005 — [English, Russian]
- Type: Instant messaging client
- License: freeware
- Website: welcome.qip.ru/im (in Russian)

QIP (/ˈkwɪp/; an acronym for Quiet Internet Pager) was a multiprotocol instant messaging client. It was a closed source freeware program originally developed by Ilgam Zyulkorneev. In 2008 it was bought by RosBusinessConsulting media group and named most popular RBC service in 2009.

== Features ==
A Softpedia review of QIP 2006 mentioned its unique feature (at the time) of tabbed message windows—instead of a message window for each chat session, one window with several tabs is shown. Since this feature's introduction, ICQ Version 6.0 now includes this feature, as do the multi-service clients Pidgin, Miranda NG, and Trillian. Other features include integrated mail.ru e-mail client, and a wider range of emoticons. QIP presents no advertisements in the application windows; this is described as a security advantage.

== Versions ==
=== QIP 2005 ===
QIP 2005 was an alternative instant messaging client based on the OSCAR protocol. It has full support of ICQ and experimental support of AIM.

QIP 2005 did not properly support Unicode which caused issues when sending and receiving non-ASCII messages unless both users use QIP.

=== QIP Infium ===
QIP Infium was the second version of QIP. It features full Unicode support and is multi-protocol client, supporting the following protocols:

- OSCAR: ICQ
- XMPP, first stolen and only then licensed on Miranda NG Jabber Plug-in with preinstalled settings for QIP, LiveJournal, Google Talk
- XIMSS (CommuniGate Pro IM and VoIP protocol) with preinstalled settings for QIP, SIPNET and Euroset
- Mail.ru Agent
- IRC (Additional plugin)

=== QIP 2010 ===
New version of QIP named QIP 2010 contained all features of Infium and interface of QIP 2005.

=== QIP 2012 ===
QIP Infium would attempt to reset Internet Explorer to use the search engine at the QIP homepage via OpenCandy. This feature could be disabled on the first attempt or by using the Add-on Manager under the Tools menu of Internet Explorer.

=== QIP PDA ===
QIP PDA was the mobile version of QIP made for Windows Mobile, Symbian OS S60, and Symbian OS UIQ 3.

Profile window of QIP PDA 3 beta running on Symbian OS S60 5th Edition

== See also ==
- Comparison of instant messaging clients
- Online chat
