= Spleak =

- Created by: Spleak Media Network

In-universe information
- Alias: spleak
- Species: MSN/AIM Chatterbot
- Origin: Silicon Valley
- Years active: 2000–2009

Spleak was an IM platform where users could publish and rate content. It existed in the form of six bots covering as many subject areas: CelebSpleak, SportSpleak, VoteSpleak, TVSpleak, GameSpleak, and StyleSpleak.

== Overview ==
Users can add a "multi-Spleak" (which contains all of the different Spleak bots in one) or add the separate bots to their IM buddy lists on MSN and AIM. Users are also allowed access to Spleak online by using a CelebSpleak, SportSpleak, or VoteSpleak widget, or through the CelebSpleak and SportSpleak applications with Facebook.

Spleak was an alternate reality game and is moving to its own company, Spleak Media Network. "Celebrate Spleak" was introduced throughout 2007, launched in 2008, and was forced to retire in 2009.

== Key people ==
Spleak was co-founded by Morten Lund and Nicolaj Reffstrup. The company's chief executive officer is Morrie Eisenburg; Josh Scott is vice president in product and Tyler Wells is vice president in engineering.

== See also ==
- lonelygirl15
- SmarterChild
