= Jeff Bonforte =

American businessman

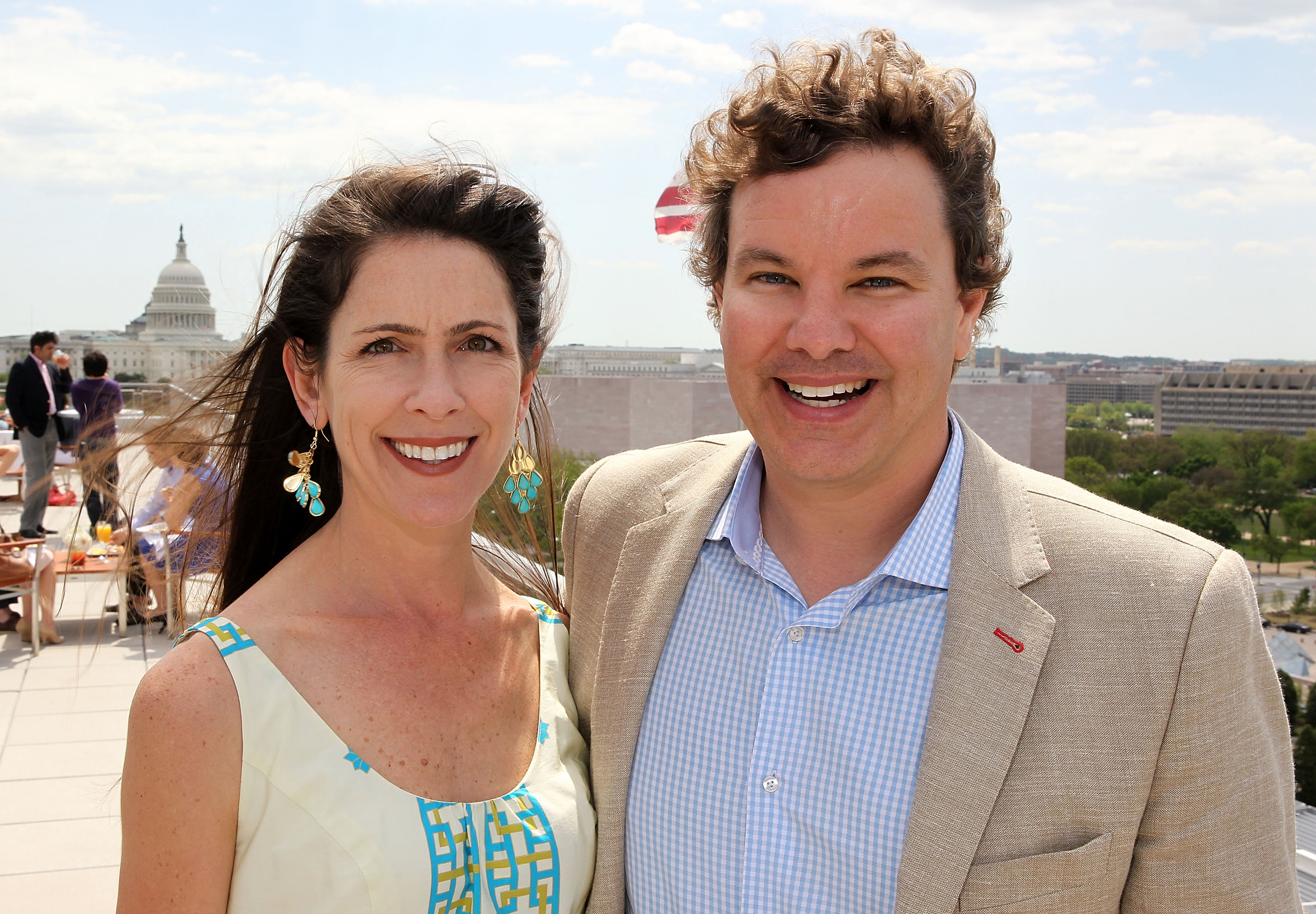
- Amy and Jeff Bonforte
- Known for: Former CEO of Grindr

Jeff Bonforte is the former CEO of Grindr. He was a senior vice president of Communications Products at Yahoo!, responsible for Yahoo! Mail, Yahoo! Messenger, Yahoo! Answers, Yahoo! Groups, Yahoo! Contacts and Yahoo! Calendar. Before that he was Chief executive officer (CEO) of Xobni, a company that Yahoo! bought in July 2013.

In late 2013, in regard to a multi-week Yahoo Mail outage and massive user dissatisfaction with the site re-design, Bonforte said at a weekly employee meeting that Yahoo would have to "kick users hard" in the nuts before they would leave Yahoo Mail.

Bonforte became the CEO of Grindr in June 2020. In September 2022, Bonforte moved into an advisory role when George Arison took over as CEO of Grindr.
