= German Klimenko =

Russian entrepreneur (b. 1966)

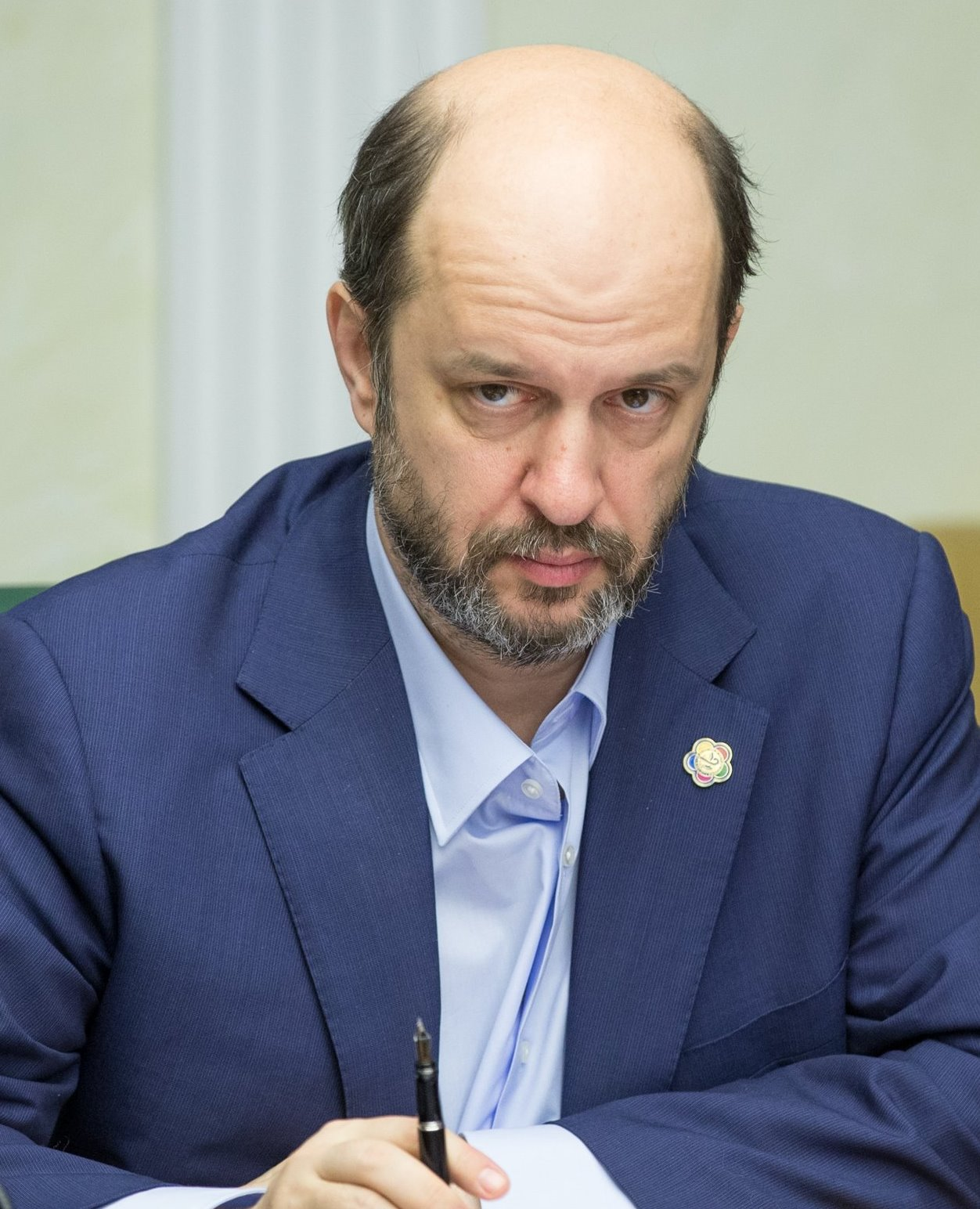
- Klimenko in 2016

Advisor to the President of Russian Federation on Internet development
- In office 2016-01-04 – 2018-06-13
- President: Vladimir Putin
- Preceded by: position established
- Succeeded by: position abolished, Dmitry Peskov as Presidential Special Representative for Digital Development

Personal details
- Born: December 7, 1966 (age 59) Moscow, RSFSR, USSR
- Education: A.F. Mozhaysky Military-Space Academy; Higher School of Economics
- Profession: software engineer, economist German Klimenko's voice From the Echo of Moscow program, 9 August 2014

German Sergeyevich Klimenko (Russian: Герман Сергеевич Клименко, born December 7, 1966, Moscow) is a Russian entrepreneur and owner of LiveInternet. He is the founder and owner of MediaMetrics, a news aggregator based on data from social networks. Chairman of the board of the Internet Development Institute from February 2015 to December 4, 2017.

Klimenko was an advisor to Russian President Vladimir Putin on Internet development (January 4, 2016 - June 13, 2018), acting State Counselor of the Russian Federation 2nd class (since 2017), and the creator and head of the LBE banner system, TopList counter, List.Ru website catalog.

== Early life and education ==
Born on December 7, 1966 in Moscow. His mother worked in automation in Promstroybank USSR, and his father was a sportsman, but after his career ended he developed problems with alcohol, which caused him and Klimenko`s mother to separate; after that she raised her son alone. As a child, he practiced pentathlon.

From 1983 to 1988, Klimenko studied at the A. F. Mozhaysky Military Engineering Red Banner Institute in Saint Petersburg, specializing as a software engineer. For further service he was sent to Kamchatka to space units in the city of Yelizovo. In 1995, he graduated from the retraining faculty of the Higher School of Economics, qualifying as an economist.

== Career ==
=== As a businessman ===
In 1993, he worked as a programmer in a branch of the Irkutsk Prospector Commercial Bank (by his admission, it was thanks to his mother's connections in the banking sector), where he reached the position of deputy director. At that time he also traded MMM shares and opened several secondary trade shops. In 1996 he moved to Rossiysky Kredit Bank, where he held a similar position until 2000.

In 1995, he founded the auditing company RK-Audit. As of 2016, the full owner was his mother. Since 2023, he reclaimed ownership of the company. In 1996 he founded the legal agency Yuragentstvo LLC. As of 2024, he owns 20 percent of the company.

From 2000 to 2008, he was the manager of the Kvota bank (later Ivy Bank), which he acquired just before the 1998 Russian financial crisis for $700,000. In 2017 the bank's license was revoked.

In June 2013, he became president of the Association for the Development of Electronic Commerce (ADEC), which unites small and medium-sized online stores.

In early 2014, he became a member of the Leaders Club of the Russian non-profit organization Agency for Strategic Initiatives (ASI), created by the Russian Government to implement measures to improve the business environment in Russia. The supervisory board is chaired by Russian President Vladimir Putin.

In February 2015, Klimenko headed the Internet Development Institute, which was created with the support of the Deputy Head of the Presidential Administration Vyacheslav Volodin. The purpose of the organization was to foster interaction between Russian technology companies and the Russian government.

On December 22, 2015, Russian President Vladimir Putin approached German Klimenko with a proposal to become his advisor on Internet development. He was appointed to this position on January 4, 2016, and on June 8 of the same year, Putin awarded Klimenko the rank of Acting State Counselor of the Russian Federation 3rd class. During his two-and-a-half years in office he met the president only once. He was relieved of his post on June 13, 2018.

In 2018, he became a senior lecturer at the Department of Information and Internet Technologies of the I.M. Sechenov First Moscow State Medical University.

In 2021, he was included in the federal list of the Russian Party of Freedom and Justice in the State Duma elections.

=== As a technology developer ===
In August 1998, he launched a directory of sites and server statistics of site traffic List.ru. In 2000 it was sold to Mail.ru for a million dollars, which launched on its basic service Top.Mail.ru.

In 2003, he launched a blogging platform Li.ru. In 2005 he combined it with his project Rax.ru to create the LiveInternet service, which was very popular in Russia in the mid-2000s. In the same year, he became one of the co-owners of 3DNews.ru, a media outlet about IT technologies launched in 1997.

In April 2009, he launched MediaTarget, a media-context advertising system based on Liveinternet. In July 2010 together with Arthur Perepelkin he created the Social Space Fund, an investment fund for the development of applications for the social network Facebook. The fund had a budget of $10 million. Klimenko later recognized the idea as a failure due to the inability to find suitable projects. As the fund manager said, “there is no point in ‘investing losers’”.

In July 2010, the first rating of Russian-language Facebook pages was created.

In January 2014, MediaMetrics, a news aggregator based on data from social networks, was launched, displaying media notes that collected the most clicks from social networks. It was initially created on behalf of Sergey Kravtsov of Qip.ru, but after the sale of Qip.ru by RBK Group, Klimenko made it his product. By the beginning of August 2014, the Mediametrics website had about 80,000 daily users, by October 8, 2015, the audience reached 300,000 users.

In August 2014, he headed the board of directors of AllinOne Network, which develops E-commerce projects for the Russian pharmaceutical retail market and the commercial medicine market, as well as digital advertising for the pharmaceutical and medical markets. In late 2015, Roskomnadzor registered Mediametrics cable TV channel.

The total value of Klimenko's Internet assets was estimated by FINAM at more than 1 billion rubles.

== Controversy involving his companies ==
=== Mediametrics censorship ===
The service was mentioned in correspondence published by Anonymous International between Timur Prokopenko, head of the Presidential Administration's Department for Domestic Policy, who called Mediametrics "our product". After the beginning of the Russo-Ukrainian information war due to the annexation of Crimea by the Russian Federation and the conflict in Eastern Ukraine, Klimenko's decision removed all Ukrainian media from the aggregator.

Due to a brief conflict materials from the TV Rain were banned from the rating for a short time.

=== Illegal torrent tracker ===
Vedomosti reported in January 2016, citing “two acquaintances” of Klimenko, without specifying their names, that he owned the torrent tracker Torrnado.ru through affiliates, which distributed pirated content (in particular, offering downloads of recently released movies) and advertisements on the Liveinternet title page. According to the newspaper's source, German Klimenko transferred control over the site to his son after his appointment to a government position. The entrepreneur himself said in response that Torrnado.ru works according to the law and “has nothing to do” with him or his son, but admitted that he cooperated with the site. Klimenko characterizes its owners as “his good acquaintances”.

== Revenue ==
The total amount of declared income for 2015 amounted to 6 million 299 thousand rubles, for 2016 – 4 million 641 thousand rubles, for 2017 – 6 million 479 thousand rubles.

== Personal life ==
Klimenko two children from his first marriage, Yuri, who graduated from the Higher School of Economics, and Nastya, and two children from another marriage with Maria, Sonya and Roma. After his appointment to a government position he gave control of some of his assets to Yuri.
