= Climm =

CLI-based instant messaging client

- Original authors: Matthew D. Smith; Rico Glöckner; Rüdiger Kuhlmann
- Stable release: 0.7.1 / March 20, 2010; 16 years ago
- Written in: C, C++, Tcl
- Operating system: Linux, BSDs, BeOS, Amiga OS, Microsoft Windows
- Type: CLI Instant messaging client
- License: GPLv2
- Website: web.archive.org/web/20160227025117/http://www.climm.org

climm (previously mICQ) is a free CLI-based instant messaging client that runs on a wide variety of platforms, including AmigaOS, BeOS, Windows (using either Cygwin or MinGW), OS X, NetBSD/OpenBSD/FreeBSD, Linux, Solaris, HP-UX, and AIX.

== Functionality ==
climm has many of the features the official ICQ client has, and more:

- It has support for SSL-encrypted direct connection compatible with licq and SIM.
- It supports OTR encrypted messages.
- It is internationalized; German, English, and other translations are available, and it supports sending and receiving acknowledged and non-acknowledged Unicode-encoded messages (it even understands UTF-8 messages for message types the ICQ protocol does not use them for).
- It is capable of running several UINs at the same time and is very configurable (e.g. different colors for incoming messages from different contacts or for different accounts).
- Due to its command-line interface, it has good usability for blind users through text-to-speech interfaces or Braille devices.

climm also supports basic functionality of the XMPP protocol.

== History ==
Climm was originally developed as mICQ by Matt D. Smith as public domain software. Starting with mICQ 0.4.8 it was licensed under the GPLv2, not much of the original PD code remained since then. All later additions were made by Rüdiger Kuhlmann, in particular, the support for the ICQ v8 protocol. mICQ was renamed to climm ("Command Line Interface Multi Messenger") with version change to 0.6. CLimm was relicensed to include the OpenSSL exception.

== See also ==
- Comparison of instant messaging clients
