= IChat =

Messaging application for Mac OS X

iChat
- Developers: Apple; AOL (partial)
- Release: 24 August 2002; 24 years ago
- Operating system: macOS
- Successor: Messages; FaceTime
- Type: Instant messaging
- License: Proprietary

iChat (previously iChat AV) is a discontinued instant messaging software application developed by Apple for use on its Mac OS X operating system. It supported instant text messaging over XMPP/Jingle or OSCAR (AIM) protocol, audio and video calling, and screen-sharing capabilities. It also allowed for local network discussion with users discovered through Bonjour protocols.

In OS X 10.8 Mountain Lion, iChat was replaced by Messages for chat and FaceTime for video calling.

== History ==
iChat was first released in August 2002 as part of Mac OS X 10.2. It featured integration with the Address Book and Mail applications and was the first officially supported AIM client that was native to Mac OS X (the first-party AIM application at the time was still running in Classic emulation).

One episode of the first season of the HBO dramedy series Entourage had Eric Murphy having an iChat conversation with Ari Gold, marking the first time that this application was used on a television series.

== Interface ==
iChat incorporated Apple's Aqua interface and used speech bubbles and pictures to personify the online chatting experience. With iChat, green (available), yellow (idle), and red (away) icons could be displayed next to the name of each connected user on the buddy list. For color-blind users, this could be altered to show different shapes, circle (available), triangle (idle), and squares (away), to illustrate status with shape rather than color.

=== iChat AV ===
In June 2003, Apple announced iChat AV, the second major version of iChat. It added video and audio conferencing capabilities based on the industry-standard Session Initiation Protocol (SIP). The final version of the software was shipped with Mac OS X 10.3 and became available separately on the same day for Mac OS X 10.2.

=== iChat AV 2 ===
In February 2004, AOL introduced AOL Instant Messenger (AIM) version 5.5 for Windows users, which enabled video, but not audio, chats over the AIM protocol and was compatible with Apple's iChat AV. On the same day, Apple released a public beta of iChat AV 2.1 to allow Mac OS X users to video conference with AIM 5.5 users.

=== iChat AV 3 ===
In June 2004, Steve Jobs announced that the next version of iChat AV would be included with Mac OS X 10.4. iChat AV 3 provided additional support to allow up to four people in a single video conference and ten people in an audio conference. Additionally, the new version of iChat used the H.264/AVC codec, which offered superior quality video compared to the older H.263 codec used in previous versions. This release supported the XMPP protocol, which could be directly used to connect to Google Talk and indirectly be used to connect to users of services including Facebook Chat, and Yahoo! Messenger. However, support was limited as it did not support several common XMPP features such as account creation, service discovery and full multi-user chat support. iChat 3 included the Bonjour protocol (previously called Rendezvous) which allowed iChat to automatically find other users with iChat Bonjour messaging enabled on the local network.

In October 2005, iChat received support for encrypted communications, but only for paid subscribers of .Mac (later MobileMe and currently iCloud) service. These features were part of iChat 3.1, released as part of the Mac OS X v10.4.3 update. This version also added support for XMPP multi-user chat.

In March 2007, Apple released the Mac OS X v10.4.9 update, which allowed USB video device class (UVC) cameras to be used with iChat, rather than FireWire cameras only. This allowed a wider range of cameras to be used with iChat AV.

=== iChat 4 ===
iChat 4, the first version release under iChat's current name, was introduced as a part of Mac OS X 10.5 and received new features including: iChat Theater (inspired by ChatFX a product from Plum Amazing), Backdrops, and Screen Sharing. iChat Theater allowed users to share any file supported by Quick Look, including photos, Keynote presentations, and movies, over a video chat session. Backdrops allowed users to insert movies or photos as a backdrop in video chats. Screen Sharing allowed two users of Mac OS X Leopard to have control of the same desktop and work collaboratively. Minor features in the new release included multiple logins, animated icons, use of Photo Booth effects in live video chat, and tabbed chats.

=== iChat 5 ===
iChat 5.0, released with Mac OS X Snow Leopard, converted iChat to a 64-bit application, reduced the bandwidth required for 640×480 video chats, and upgraded iChat Theater to the same resolution.

=== iChat 6 ===
iChat 6.0, released with Mac OS X 10.7, added support for Yahoo Messenger account and allowed iChat users to have text, voice and video chats using their Yahoo Mail accounts. It also supported third-party plugins, eventually allowing other protocols to be compatible with the software. iChat 6 was the last iChat version; in OS X Mountain Lion, it was replaced by Messages. The final release, iChat 6.0.1, was published on February 1, 2012.

=== Messages ===
As part of the OS X Mountain Lion preview, Apple announced on February 16, 2012, that its OS X messaging client would be Messages, and that it would support the iMessage protocol, making it compatible with the iOS client. Messages also incorporates FaceTime support. Apple made Messages immediately available as a downloadable beta version for use on Mac OS X 10.7.

== Supported protocols ==
iChat's AIM support was fully endorsed by AOL, and used their official implementation of the AIM OSCAR protocol. Using a XMPP transport, iChat could serve as a client for AOL Instant Messenger, Yahoo Messenger, MobileMe, ICQ and XMPP. iChat could also integrate Google Talk contacts into the XMPP pane.

== See also ==
- Comparison of cross-platform instant messaging clients
- Comparison of instant messaging protocols
- FaceTime
- Messages
- Videotelephony
