= Mirabilis (company) =

Israeli technological company

- Founded: July 1996; 29 years ago, Israel
- Founder: Yossi Vardi
- Fate: Acquired
- Successor: AOL; Mail.ru Group
- Owner: Digital Sky Technologies (ICQ); AOL

Mirabilis was an Israeli company that developed the ICQ instant messaging program, an early example of real-time communication over the Internet.

== History ==
Mirabilis was founded in July 1996 by Arik Vardi, Yair Goldfinger, Sefi Visiger and Amnon Amir.

Goldfinger, Visiger, Vardi and Amir met while working for a Tel Aviv software company, Zapa Digital Arts, that specialized in three-dimensional graphic tools for the Internet. In 1996, they left Zapa and began to toy with ideas for new Internet innovations. They created ICQ in less than two months, but had no funding. Yossi Vardi, the father of Arik Vardi and one of the founders of Israel Chemicals, agreed to invest a few hundred thousand dollars to develop the technology. Mirabilis was established in a small apartment in San Jose, California, where Internet access was cheaper.

ICQ grew as people encouraged their friends to join so they could communicate with each other. This established a powerful network effect as prospective users strongly preferred the system where their friends were likely to be.

It was purchased by America Online (AOL) for $287 million in 1998.

AOL sold ICQ to Digital Sky Technologies for $187.5 million on April 28, 2010.

== See also ==
- Economy of Israel
- Science and technology in Israel
- Israeli inventions and discoveries
