= ICQ =

Cross-platform instant messaging system and VoIP client

- ICQ logo (1998–2014)
- Original author: Mirabilis
- Developers: Mirabilis (1996–1998); AOL (1998–2010); VK (2010–2024)
- Release: November 15, 1996; 30 years ago
- Final release: 10.0.46867 (May 27, 2022)
- Written in: C++ (Linux, Windows, macOS); Objective-C, Swift (iOS); Java, Kotlin (Android)
- Platform: iOS; Android; Windows; macOS; web application; Linux; Windows Phone; Windows Mobile; Java; Symbian OS; Symbian S60; BlackBerry OS; Bada; Amazon Fire; Palm Pilot; iMode
- Available in: Russian; English; Hebrew; Portuguese; Ukrainian; German; Czech; French; Chinese; Turkish; Spanish; Arabic; Vietnamese
- Type: Instant messaging
- License: Proprietary
- Website: icq.com
- Repository: github.com/mail-ru-im/im-desktop

ICQ was a cross-platform instant messaging (IM) and VoIP client founded in June 1996 by Yair Goldfinger, Sefi Vigiser, Amnon Amir, Arik Vardi, and Arik's father, Yossi Vardi. The name ICQ derives from the English phrase "I Seek You". Originally developed by the Israeli company Mirabilis in 1996, the client was bought by AOL in 1998, and then by Mail.Ru Group (now VK) in 2010.

The ICQ client application and service were initially released in November 1996, freely available to download. The business did not have traditional marketing and relied mostly on word-of-mouth advertising instead. ICQ was among the first stand-alone instant messenger (IM) applications—while real-time chat was not in itself new (Internet Relay Chat [IRC] being the most common platform at the time), the concept of a fully centralized service with individual user accounts focused on one-on-one conversations set the blueprint for later instant messaging services like AIM. ICQ became the first widely adopted IM platform.

At its peak around 2001, ICQ had more than 100 million accounts registered. At the time of the Mail.Ru acquisition in 2010, there were around 42 million daily users. In 2022, ICQ had about 11 million monthly users.

The service was shut down on June 26, 2024, following an announcement on ICQ's website in May 2024.

== Features of ICQ New ==
The last version of the service, launched in 2020 as "ICQ New", featured a number of different messaging functions:

- Private chats: conversations between two users, with history synchronized to the cloud. A user could delete a sent message at any time, and a notification will be shown indicating that the message has been deleted.
- A chat with oneself, which could be used to save messages from group or private chats, or upload media content as a form of cloud storage.
- Group chats with up to 25,000 participants at the same time, which any user could create. Users could hide their phone number from other participants, see which group members have read a message, and switched off notifications for messages from specific group members.
- Audio and video calls with up to five people.
- Sending and receiving of audio messages, with automatic transcription to text.
- Channels, where authors could publish posts as text messages and attach media files, similar to a blog. Once the post was published, subscribers receive a notification as they would from regular and group chats. The channel author could remain anonymous.
- Polls inside group chats.
- An API-bot which could be used by anyone to create a bot, to perform specific actions and interact with users.
- "Stickers": small images or photos expressing some form of emotion that could be selected from a provided sticker library or users could upload their own. Machine learning was used to recommend stickers automatically.
- "Masks": images that could be superimposed onto the camera in real-time during video calls, or onto photos to be sent to other users.
- Nicknames, which users could set to use in place of a phone number for others to search for and contact them.
- "Smart answers": short phrases that appear above the message box which can be used to answer messages. ICQ New analyzed the contents of a conversation and suggests a few pre-set answers.

== UIN ==
ICQ users were identified and distinguished from one another by UIN, or User Identification Numbers, distributed in sequential order. The UIN was invented by Mirabilis, as the user name assigned to each user upon registration. Issued UINs started at '100,000' (six digits) and every user received a UIN when first registering with ICQ. As of ICQ6 users were also able to log in using the specific e-mail address they associated with their UIN during the initial registration process. Unlike other instant messaging software or web applications, on ICQ the only permanent user info was the UIN, although it was possible to search for other users using their associated e-mail address or any other detail they made public by updating it in their account's public profile. In addition the user could change all of his or her personal information, including screen name and e-mail address, without having to re-register. Since 2000, ICQ and AIM users were able to add each other to their contact list without the need for any external clients. As a response to UIN theft or sale of attractive UINs, ICQ started to store email addresses previously associated with a UIN. As such UINs that are stolen could sometimes be reclaimed, if a valid primary email address was entered into the user profile.

== History ==
The founding company of ICQ, Mirabilis, was established in June 1996 by five Israeli developers: Yair Goldfinger, Sefi Vigiser, Amnon Amir, Arik Vardi, and Arik's father Yossi Vardi. ICQ was one of the first text-based messengers to reach a wide range of users.

The technology Mirabilis developed for ICQ was distributed free of charge. The technology's success encouraged AOL to acquire Mirabilis on June 8, 1998, for $287 million up front and $120 million in additional payments over three years based on performance levels. In 2002 AOL successfully patented the technology.

After the purchase, the product was initially managed by Ariel Yarnitsky and Avi Shechter. ICQ's management changed at the end of 2003. Under the leadership of the new CEO, Orey Gilliam, who also assumed the responsibility for all of AOL's messaging business in 2007, ICQ resumed its growth; it was not only a highly profitable company, but one of AOL's most successful businesses. Eliav Moshe replaced Gilliam in 2009 and became ICQ's managing director.

ICQ logo (2015–2020)

In April 2010, AOL sold ICQ to Digital Sky Technologies, headed by Alisher Usmanov, for $187.5 million. While ICQ was displaced by AOL Instant Messenger, Google Talk, and other competitors in the US and many other countries over the 2000s, it remained the most popular instant messaging network in Russian-speaking countries, and an important part of online culture. Popular UINs demanded over 11,000₽ in 2010.

In September of that year, Digital Sky Technologies changed its name to Mail.Ru Group. Since the acquisition, Mail.ru has invested in turning ICQ from a desktop client to a mobile messaging system. As of 2013, around half of ICQ's users were using its mobile apps, and in 2014, the number of users began growing for the first time since the purchase.

In March 2016, the source code of the client was released under an Apache License on GitHub.

ICQ logo (2020–2024)

In 2020, Mail.Ru Group decided to launch a new version, "ICQ New", based on the original ICQ. The updated software was presented to the general public on April 6, 2020.

During the second week of January 2021, ICQ saw a renewed increase in popularity in Hong Kong, spurred on by the controversy over WhatsApp's privacy policy update. The number of downloads for the application increased 35-fold in the region.

In 2022, VK removed the ICQ app from mobile app stores as it shifted its focus to VK Messenger. On May 24, 2024, the main page of ICQ's website announced that the service would be shutting down on June 26, 2024. ICQ recommended that users migrate to VK Messenger and VK WorkSpace.

=== Development history ===
- ICQ 99a/b the first releases that were widely available.
- ICQ 2000 incorporated into Notes and Reminder features.
- ICQ 2001 included server-side storage of the contact list. This provided synchronization between multiple computers and enforced obtaining consent before adding UINs to the contact list by preventing clients from modifying the local contact list directly.
- In 2002, AOL Time Warner announced that ICQ had been issued a United States patent for instant messaging.
- ICQ 2002 was the last completely advertising-free ICQ version.
- ICQ Pro 2003b was the first ICQ version to use the ICQ protocol version 10. However, ICQ 5 and 5.1 use version 9 of the protocol. ICQ 2002 and 2003a used version 8 of the ICQ protocol. Earlier versions (ICQ 2001b and all ICQ clients before it) used ICQ protocol version 7.
- ICQ 4 and later ICQ 5 (released on Monday, February 7, 2005), were upgrades on ICQ Lite. One addition was Xtraz, which offers games and features intended to appeal to younger users of the Internet. ICQ Lite was originally an idea to offer the lighter users of instant messaging an alternative client which was a smaller download and less resource-hungry for relatively slow computers.
- ICQ 5 introduced skins support. There are few official skins available for the current ICQ 5.1 at the official website; however, a number of user-generated skins have been made available for download.
- ICQ 6, released on April 17, 2007, was the first major update since ICQ 4. The user interface was redesigned using Boxely, the same rendering engine used in AIM Triton. The change added features such as the ability to send IMs directly from the client's contact list. Version 6 did not support sending multiple files at one time. In July 2008, a network upgrade forced users to stop using ICQ 5.1. Applications that identified themselves as ICQ 5, such as Pidgin, had to identify themselves as ICQ 6.
- ICQ 7.0, released on January 18, 2010. This update includes integration with Facebook and other websites. It also allows custom personal status similar to Windows Live Messenger (MSN Messenger). ICQ 7.0 does not support traditional Chinese on standard installation or with the addition of an official language pack. This has made its adoption difficult with the established user base from Hong Kong and Taiwan where traditional Chinese is the official language.
- ICQ 8, released on February 5, 2012 – "Meet the new generation of ICQ, Enjoy free video calls, messages and SMS, social networks support and more."
- ICQ 10.0, released January 18, 2016. Final update was 10.0 Build 46867, released on May 27, 2022.

== Criticism ==
=== Policy against unofficial clients ===
AOL (and later Mail.ru) pursued an aggressive policy regarding alternative ("unauthorized") ICQ clients.

- In July 2008, changes were implemented on ICQ servers causing many unofficial clients to stop working. These users received an official notification from "ICQ System".
- On December 9, 2008, another change to the ICQ servers occurred: clients sending Client IDs not matching ICQ 5.1 or higher stopped working.
- On December 29, 2008, the ICQ press service distributed a statement characterizing alternative clients as dangerous.
- On January 21, 2009, ICQ servers started blocking all unofficial clients in Russia and Commonwealth of Independent States countries. Users in Russia and Ukraine received a message from UIN 1:

"Системное сообщение

ICQ не поддерживает используемую вами версию. Скачайте бесплатную авторизованную версию ICQ с официального web-сайта ICQ.

System Message

The version you are using is not supported by ICQ. Download a free authorized ICQ version from ICQ's official website."

On icq.com there was an "important message" for Russian-speaking ICQ users: "ICQ осуществляет поддержку только авторизированных версий программ: ICQ Lite и ICQ 6.5." ("ICQ supports only authorized versions of programs: ICQ Lite and ICQ 6.5.")

- On February 3, 2009, the events of January 21 were repeated.
- On December 27, 2018, ICQ announced it was to stop supporting unofficial clients, affecting many users who prefer a compact size using Miranda NG and other clients.
- On December 28, 2018, ICQ stopped working on some unofficial clients.
- In late March, 2019, ICQ stopped working on the Pidgin client, as initiated in December 2018.

=== Cooperation with Russian intelligence services ===
According to a Novaya Gazeta article published in May 2018, Russian intelligence agencies had access to online reading of ICQ users' correspondence during crime investigations. The article examined 34 sentences of Russian courts, during the investigation of which the evidence of the defendants' guilt was obtained by reading correspondence on a PC or mobile devices. In six of the fourteen cases in which ICQ was involved, the capturing of information occurred before the seizure of the device. Because the rival service Telegram blocks all access for the agencies, the Advisor of the Russian President, German Klimenko, recommended to use ICQ instead.

=== Child pornography ===
In 2023, an investigation by Brazilian news outlet Núcleo Jornalismo found that ICQ was used to freely share child pornography due to lax moderation policies.

== Clients ==
AOL's OSCAR network protocol used by ICQ was proprietary and using a third party client was a violation of ICQ Terms of Service. Nevertheless, a number of third-party clients were created by using reverse-engineering and protocol descriptions. These clients included:

- Adium: supports ICQ, Yahoo!, AIM, MSN, Google Talk, XMPP, and others, for macOS
- Ayttm: supports ICQ, Yahoo!, AIM, MSN, IRC, and XMPP
- BitlBee: IRC gateway, supports ICQ, Yahoo!, AIM, MSN, Google Talk, and XMPP
- Centericq: supports ICQ, Yahoo!, AIM, MSN, IRC and XMPP, text-based
- climm (formerly mICQ): text-based
- Jimm: supports ICQ, for Java ME mobile devices
- Kopete: supports AIM, ICQ, MSN, Yahoo, XMPP, Google Talk, IRC, Gadu-Gadu, Novell GroupWise Messenger and others, for Unix-like
- Meetro: IM and social networking combined with location; supports AIM, ICQ, MSN, Yahoo!
- Miranda NG: supports ICQ, Yahoo!, AIM, MSN, IRC, Google Talk, XMPP, Gadu-Gadu, BNet and others, for Windows
- Naim: ncurses-based
- Pidgin (formerly Gaim): supports ICQ, Yahoo!, AIM, Gtalk, MSN, IRC, XMPP, Gadu-Gadu, SILC, Meanwhile, (IBM Lotus Sametime) and others
- QIP: supports ICQ, AIM, XMPP and XIMSS
- stICQ: supports ICQ, for Symbian OS
- Trillian: supports ICQ, IRC, Google Talk, XMPP and others

AOL supported clients include:

- AOL Instant Messenger (discontinued on December 15, 2017)
- Messages/iChat: uses ICQ's UIN as an AIM screenname, for macOS

== See also ==
- Comparison of instant messaging clients
- Comparison of instant messaging protocols
- LAN messenger
- Online chat
- Tencent QQ
- Windows Live Messenger
