= Yahoo Messenger =

Instant messaging protocol

Yahoo! Messenger
- Yahoo! Messenger logo from 2002 to 2016

- Yahoo! Messenger 8.1 (rel. September 2007 on Windows) buddy list
- Developer: Yahoo!
- Release: March 9, 1998; 28 years ago (as Yahoo! Pager); June 21, 1999; 27 years ago (as Yahoo! Messenger)
- Final release: Latest versions: Windows: 11.5.0.228 / March 13, 2012; 14 years ago; Mac: 3.0.2 / July 14, 2012; 14 years ago; Windows Phone 7: 1.0.6 / September 2013; 13 years ago; SunOS 5.7: 0.99.17–1 / September 2003; 23 years ago; Solaris 8: 1.0.4 / September 2003; 23 years ago; FreeBSD 4/5: 1.0.4 / September 2003; 23 years ago; Android: 2.9.2 / July 6, 2017; 9 years ago; iOS: 1.0.7/ February 29, 2016; 10 years ago
- Operating system: Android, iOS, Windows, Windows Mobile, macOS, BlackBerry OS, FreeBSD, Solaris, SunOS
- Type: Instant messaging client and Internet phone
- License: Proprietary adware

Yahoo! Messenger (sometimes abbreviated Y!M) was an instant messaging client and associated protocol created and formerly operated by Yahoo!. Yahoo! Messenger was provided free of charge and could be downloaded and used with a generic "Yahoo ID", which also allowed access to other Yahoo! services, such as Yahoo! Mail.

The service also offered VoIP, file transfers, webcam hosting, a text messaging service, and chat rooms in various categories. In addition to instant messaging features similar to those offered by ICQ, it also offered (on Microsoft Windows) features such as: IMVironments (customizing the look of Instant Message windows, some of which include authorized themes of various cartoons such as Garfield or Dilbert), address-book integration and Custom Status Messages. It was also the first major IM client to feature BUZZing and music-status.

Yahoo! Messenger dates back to Yahoo! Chat, which was a public chat room service. The actual client, originally called Yahoo! Pager, launched on March 9, 1998 and renamed to Yahoo! Messenger in 1999. Yahoo! Messenger was among the most popular instant messengers during the 2000s. In 2015, a reworked Yahoo! Messenger service was introduced and the legacy version was discontinued in 2016. The new Yahoo! Messenger itself was shut down entirely on July 17, 2018, after less than three years.

== History ==
=== Yahoo! Pager ===
Yahoo! Pager launched on March 9, 1998, an instant messaging (IM) client integrated with Yahoo! services including Yahoo! Chat (more explained in its section below). It included basic messaging support, a buddy list with status message support, the ability to block other users, alerts when a buddies came online, and notifications when a new Yahoo! Mail message arrived. In 2000, the name changed to Yahoo! Messenger.

=== Versions 5 to 8 ===
Version 5.0, released November 2001, introduced IMVironments, an initiative that allowed users to play music and Flash Video clips inside the IM window. Yahoo! partnered with rock band Garbage that provided their single "Androgyny" available to share by users. Other partnerships also made IMVironments for the movie Monsters, Inc., the video game Super Smash Bros. Melee, and the character Hello Kitty, among others.

In August 2002 with the release of version 5.5, the resolution for video calling was increased to a possible 320x240 and 20 frames per second (up from 160x120 and 1 frame per second). From October 2002, Yahoo! offered for corporate subscribers a more secure and better (SSL) encrypted IM client, called Yahoo! Messenger Enterprise Edition. It was released with a $30 yearly subscription package in 2003.

Yahoo! Messenger version 6.0 was released in May 2004. It added games, music, photos, and Yahoo! Search, alongside a "stealth" mode. It also debuted Yahoo! Avatars. With the release of version 7.0 in August 2005, the client was now renamed to Yahoo! Messenger with Voice. It had several new features such as VoIP, voicemail, drag-and-drop file and photo sharing, Yahoo! 360° and LAUNCHcast integration, and others. It was seen as a challenger against Skype.

On October 12, 2005, Yahoo! and Microsoft formed an alliance in which Yahoo! Messenger and MSN Messenger (later known as Windows Live Messenger) will be interconnected, allowing users of both communities to communicate and share emoticons and buddy lists with each other. The service was enabled on Yahoo! Messenger with Voice 8.0 in July 2006. As of version 8.1, the name switched back to just Yahoo! Messenger.

Beginning in 2006, Yahoo made known its intention to provide a web interface for Yahoo! Messenger, culminating in the Gmail-like web archival and indexing of chat conversations through Yahoo! Mail. However, while Yahoo! Mail integrated much of the rudimentary features of Messenger beginning in 2007, Yahoo did not succeed initially in integrating archival of chat conversations into Mail. Instead, a separate Adobe Flex-based web messenger was released in 2007 with archival of conversations which take place inside the web messenger itself.

=== Web version and later releases ===
Yahoo! Messenger for Vista buddy list

At the Consumer Electronics Show in January 2007, Yahoo! Messenger for Vista was introduced, which is a version designed and optimized for Windows Vista. It exploited the new design elements of Vista's Windows Presentation Foundation (WPF) and introduced a new user interface and features. The application was in a preview beta until finally released for download on December 6, 2007. As of October 24, 2008, Yahoo! Messenger for Vista is no longer available.

In May 2007, Yahoo! Messenger for the Web was launched, a browser-based client of the IM service.

Yahoo! Messenger version 9 was released in September 2008. It allows the viewing of YouTube videos within the chat window, and integrates with other Yahoo! services such as Flickr. This version also saw the release of Pingbox, which embeds on a blog or website and allows visitors to send IM texts anonymously without needing Yahoo! Messenger software or to sign in. Version 10, released November 2009, incorporates many bug fixes and features high-quality video calling.

The last major Windows client release, version 11 in 2011, featured integration with Facebook, Twitter and Zynga, allowing chat with Facebook friends and playing Zynga games within. It also archives past messages on an online server which is accessible through the client. Version 11.5 (released November 2011) added tabbed IMs.

=== New Yahoo Messenger ===

Desktop version of Yahoo! Messenger (2016)

In December 2015, an all-new, rewritten Yahoo! Messenger was launched, only on mobile and through a browser. A desktop version of the "new" Messenger was later released, shortly before the "legacy" Messenger shut down on August 5, 2016 and the clients no longer working by August 31, 2016.

Unable to find success like in the older days, Yahoo! eventually announced that the new Yahoo! Messenger service would shut down on July 17, 2018.

== Mobile versions ==
Mobile versions of Yahoo! Messenger were launched originally for Palm OS and Windows CE devices. In a deal signed March 2000, Yahoo! Messenger would come bundled on Palm handheld computers. It was also available for Verizon Wireless customers, through a deal with Yahoo! announced in March 2001, and through Sprint's MiniBrowser. A version for the T-Mobile Sidekick II was released in 2004. This was to be followed by versions for Symbian (via Yahoo! Go), BlackBerry, and then for iPhone in April 2009. A version called Yahoo! Messenger for SMS also existed, which allowed IM via SMS. As of January 2014, the iOS version supported voice calls, with video calling on some devices. The Android version supported "voice & video calls (beta)".

=== Yahoo! Together ===
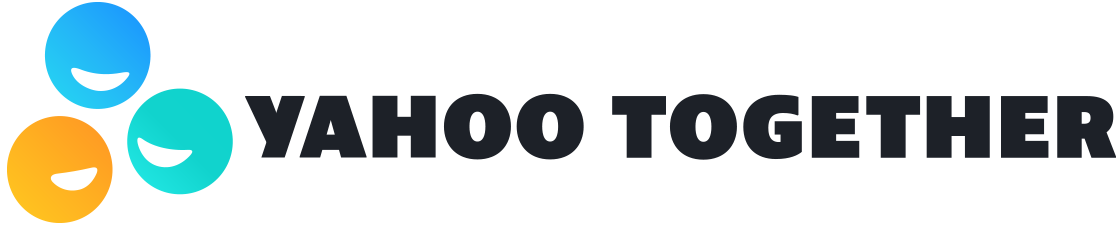

Yahoo! Together was a freeware and cross-platform messaging service, developed by Yahoo! for the Android and iOS mobile platforms. The software was introduced in beta on May 8, 2018, as Yahoo! Squirrel to replace Yahoo! Messenger and Verizon Media's AOL Instant Messenger. In October 2018, it was renamed to its present name. Yahoo! Together was targeted to families and the consumer market rather than enterprise. The app was compared to Slack. Less than a year after its public beta release, Yahoo! Together went offline on April 4, 2019.

== Group conversations (Yahoo! Chat) ==
A screenshot of the Yahoo! Chat service, c. 2000

Yahoo! Messenger allowed private group conversations. Yahoo! Chat was a free online chat room service provided exclusively for Yahoo! users. Yahoo! Chat was first launched on January 7, 1997. Yahoo! Chat was a separate vertical on Yahoo!. On March 9, 1998, the first public version of Yahoo! Pager was released, with Yahoo! Chat among its features. It allowed users to create public chat rooms, send private messages, and use emoticons.

In its original form, Yahoo! Chat was a user-to-user text chat service used by millions worldwide. Soon after launch, Yahoo! Chat partnered with NBC and NewsCorp to produce moderated Chat Events. Yahoo! Chat events eventually developed broadcast partnerships with 100+ entities and hosted 350+ events-a-month. Yahoo's Live Chat with the music group Hanson on July 21, 1998, was the Internet's largest live event to date. The blockbusters kept on with events including 3 Beatles (Paul, George, Ringo), a live event from Columbine during the tragedy (in partnership with Time Online), live chats from outer space with John Glenn and many others. Yahoo! Chat Events were discontinued in 2001, right at the start of the social media era.

In June 2005, with no advance warning, Yahoo disabled users' ability to create their own chat rooms. The move came after KPRC-TV in Houston, Texas, reported that many of the user-created rooms were geared toward pedophilia. The story prompted several advertisers, including Pepsi and Georgia-Pacific, to pull their ads from Yahoo.

On November 30, 2012, Yahoo announced that among other changes that the public chat rooms would be discontinued as of December 14, 2012. quoting "This will enable us to refocus our efforts on modernizing our core Yahoo products experiences and of course, create new ones"

Yahoo has since closed down the chat.yahoo.com site (first having it redirect visitors to a section of the Yahoo! Messenger page, but as of June 2019 not even resolving that host name anymore) because the great majority of chat users accessed it through Messenger. In June 2005, Yahoo stopped users from creating their own chat rooms after a television report found rooms aimed at adults seeking contact with children; the company said it was "working on improvements" to the service. A greyed-out option to "create a room" was available until the release of version 11.

== Games ==
There were various games and applications available that can be accessed via the conversation window by clicking the games icon and challenging your current contact. It requires Java to function. As of April 18, 2014, games were removed from Yahoo! Messenger.

== Doodle ==
Doodle was a feature within Yahoo! Messenger. It's unknown when it was released, but some believe it was alongside Yahoo! Messenger's initial release. Doodle let users draw while messaging. People loved Doodle, because it allowed conversations to have more expression than the regular text and emoticons messages. It supported more than two participants, allowing group chats to draw together. Yahoo! Messenger was a pioneer of online messaging, which made Doodle and its collaborative features, popular and loved globally.

== Plug-ins ==
In version 8.0, Yahoo! Messenger featured the ability for users to create plug-ins, which are then hosted and showcased on the Yahoo chat room. Yahoo! Messenger users could listen to free and paid Internet radio services, using the defunct Yahoo! Music Radio plug-in from within the messenger window. The plug-in also player functionality, such as play, pause, skip and rate this song.

== Message decoders ==
Yahoo! Messenger also had a feature to save, or archive chats. These were stored as .dat files on a user's computer. Many tools have emerged to help people retrieve their legacy Yahoo! Messenger messages, chats, and conversations.

== Protocol ==
The Yahoo! Messenger Protocol (YMSG) was the client's underlying network protocol. It provided a language and series of conventions for software communicating with Yahoo!'s Instant Messaging service. In essence, YMSG performed the same role for Yahoo!'s IM as HTTP does for the World Wide Web. Unlike HTTP, however, YMSG was a proprietary protocol, a closed standard aligned only with the Yahoo! messaging service. Rival messaging services have their own protocols, some based on open standards, others proprietary, each effectively fulfilling the same role with different mechanics.

One of the fundamental tenets of instant messaging is the notion that users can see when someone is connected to the network—known in the industry as 'presence'. The YMSG protocol used the mechanics of a standard internet connection to achieve presence—the same connection it used to send and receive data. In order for each user to remain 'visible' to other users on the service, and thereby signaling their availability, their Yahoo! IM client software maintained a functional, open, network connection linking the client to Yahoo!'s IM servers.

=== URI scheme ===
Yahoo! Messenger's installation process automatically installed an extra uniform resource identifier (URI) scheme handler for the Yahoo! Messenger Protocol into some web browsers, so that URIs beginning ymsgr could open a new Yahoo! Messenger window with specified parameters. This is similar in function to the mailto URI scheme, which creates a new e-mail message using the system's default mail program. For instance, a web page might include a link like the following in its HTML source to open a window for sending a message to the YIM user exampleuser:

<a href="ymsgr:sendim?exampleuser">Send Message</a>

To specify a message body, the m parameter was used, so that the link location might look like this: ymsgr:sendim?exampleuser&m=This+is+my+message

Other commands were:

- ymsgr:sendim?yahooid
- ymsgr:addfriend?yahooid
- ymsgr:sendfile?yahooid
- ymsgr:call?yahooid
- ymsgr:callPhone?phonenumber
- ymsgr:im – opened the "Send an IM" window
- ymsgr:customstatus?A+custom+status – changed the status message
- ymsgr:getimv?imvname – loaded an IMVironment (example: ymsgr:getimv?doodle, ymsgr:getimv?yfighter)

=== Interoperability ===
On October 13, 2005, Yahoo and Microsoft announced plans to introduce interoperability between their two messengers, creating the second-largest real-time communications service userbase worldwide: 40 percent of all users. The announcement came after years of third-party interoperability success (most notably, Trillian and Pidgin) and criticisms that the major real-time communications services were locking their networks. Microsoft has also had talks with AOL in an attempt to introduce further interoperability, but AOL was unwilling to participate.

Interoperability between Yahoo and Windows Live Messenger was launched July 12, 2006. This allowed Yahoo and Windows Live Messenger users to chat to each other without the need to create an account on the other service, provided both contacts used the latest versions of the clients. It was not possible to talk using the voice service between the two different messengers.

As of December 14, 2012, the interoperability between Yahoo! Messenger and Windows Live Messenger ceased to exist. The Live Messenger contacts appeared as greyed out and it was not possible to send instant messages to them.

Third-party clients that could access the original service included:

- Adium
- BitlBee
- Centericq
- Empathy
- Fire
- imeem
- IMVU
- Kopete
- meebo
- Meetro
- Miranda NG
- Paltalk
- Pidgin
- Trillian
- Trillian Astra
- Trillian Pro
- Windows Live Messenger

== Reception ==
=== Usage ===
As of August 2000, according to Media Metrix, Yahoo! Messenger had about 10.6 million users in the U.S., about the same as MSN Messenger but trailing AOL Instant Messenger. However another analyst doubted the figures for Yahoo! and MSN.

As of the month of September 2001, over five billion instant messages were sent on the network, up 115% from the year before, according to Media Metrix. Another study in August 2002 showed that it had a 16.7 percent share of IM work and home subscribers in the U.S., compared to 24.1 percent for MSN and 28.3 percent for AIM.

In April 2002, 19.1 million people in the U.S. used Yahoo! Messenger, according to Media Metrix. Another study from Nielsen Net Ratings showed that as of 2002, Yahoo! Messenger had some 12 million users worldwide. This increased to 22 million by March 2006.

Yahoo! Messenger was the dominant instant messaging platform among certain energy traders until the platform was discontinued in August 2016.

At the time of Yahoo! Messenger's closure in 2018, it remained popular in Vietnam.

=== Criticism ===
Yahoo! Messenger users were subjected to unsolicited messages (SPIM). Yahoo's primary solution to the issue involved deleting such messages and placing the senders on an Ignore List.

As of 2007, it was estimated that at least 75% of all users who used Yahoo chat rooms were bots. Yahoo introduced a CAPTCHA system to help filter out bots from joining chat rooms, but such systems generally do little to prevent abuse by spammers.

== Security ==
On November 4, 2014, the Electronic Frontier Foundation listed Yahoo! Messenger on its "Secure Messaging Scorecard". Yahoo! Messenger received 1 out of 7 points on the scorecard. It received a point for encryption during transit, but missed points because communications were not encrypted with a key the provider didn't have access to (i.e. the communications were not end-to-end encrypted), users couldn't verify contacts' identities, past messages were not secure if the encryption keys were stolen (i.e. the service did not provide forward secrecy), the code was not open to independent review (i.e. the source code was not open-source), the security design was not properly documented, and there had not been a recent independent security audit.

The British intelligence agency Government Communications Headquarters (GCHQ)'s secret mass surveillance program Optic Nerve and National Security Agency (NSA) were reported to be indiscriminately collecting still images from Yahoo webcam streams from millions of mostly innocent Yahoo webcam users from 2008 to 2010, among other things creating a database for facial recognition for future use. Optic Nerve took a still image from the webcam stream every 5 minutes.

In September 2016, The New York Times reported that Yahoo's security team, led by Alex Stamos, had pressed for Yahoo to adopt end-to-end encryption sometime between 2014 and 2015, but this had been resisted by Jeff Bonforte, Yahoo's senior vice president, "because it would have hurt Yahoo's ability to index and search message data".

== See also ==
- AOL Instant Messenger
- Comparison of cross-platform instant messaging clients
- Comparison of instant messaging protocols
- Comparison of IRC clients
- Facebook Messenger
- Instant messaging
- MSN Messenger
