= OSCAR protocol =

Instant messaging and presence information protocol

- Communication protocol
- Purpose: Instant messaging
- Developer: AOL
- Website: dev.aol.com/aim/oscar at the Wayback Machine (archived 2008-03-08)

Open System for Communication in Realtime (OSCAR) is AOL's proprietary instant messaging and presence information protocol. It was used by AOL's AIM instant messaging system and ICQ.

Despite its name, the specifications for the protocol remain proprietary. AOL has gone to great lengths to keep competitors (namely Microsoft, XMPP, and Cerulean Studios) from implementing compatible clients for their proprietary messaging systems. In 2002, AOL signed a contract with Apple, Inc., allowing them to use OSCAR (as well as AOL's own code libraries) in their iChat application. This allowed iChat users to interact with ICQ and AIM users directly. The deal also permitted users of Apple's .Mac service to log in to the AIM network using their .Mac email addresses. (This has carried over to Apple's MobileMe service.)

As of 2009, large parts of the protocol had been reverse-engineered and implemented by a number of third-party clients.

The OSCAR protocol can be used separately from AOL's network. In fact, AOL expands on the general concept of OSCAR, adding systems for service-side buddy lists and icons, as well as features for file transfers using Bonjour.

On March 6, 2006, AOL released the AIM SDK and launched a developer website, allowing developers to build plugins for AIM Triton, and build their own custom clients, which connect over the OSCAR protocol. They had not, at that point, however, released any information about the protocol itself.

On March 5, 2008, AOL released portions of the OSCAR protocol documentation. Google also provided the ability to sign in to AIM network via the Google Talk client built into Gmail.

== Packet structure ==
All packets sent over OSCAR are encapsulated in the same manner. All 16-bit integers sent over the network are unsigned, and big endian (see Endianness.) This is the same for 32-bit integers, and 8-bit integers (or bytes.)

=== FLAP header ===
A special Frame Layer Protocol (FLAP) container encloses every packet. It carries information about packet size, channel, and its number in sequence.

Offset (hex)	Field	Type/Size (in bytes)	Remarks
00	FLAP ID	byte/1	Always equal to 2A. It marks the start of the packet.
01	Channel	byte/1	1 = login, 2 = SNAC layer, 3 = error, 4 = disconnect
02	Number in sequence	int16/2	Incremented by 1 each time a packet is sent. Wraps to 0 after FFFF.
04	Data size	int16/2	Size does not include FLAP header

=== SNAC data ===
Within almost every packet sent over channel 2, packets contain a SNAC (Simple Network Atomic Communication). There is always either one or zero of these contained in a packet, and therefore they do not contain (nor do they need to) a length.

Offset (hex)	Field	Type/Size (in bytes)	Remarks
00	Foodgroup	int16/2	The general type of the packet
02	Type	int16/2	The specific type of the packet
04	Flags	int16/2	
06	Request ID	int32/4	A request ID: this can be random but clients cannot send this with the Highest Order Bit set.

== See also ==
- Comparison of instant messaging clients
- Comparison of instant messaging protocols
- TOC protocol, AOL's free but deprecated messaging protocol
- TOC2 protocol, as of 2009, the most current version of the TOC protocol
