= AIM (software) =

Defunct instant messaging service

AOL Instant Messenger
- AIM logo in the early 2000s

- AIM version 4.7, released in 2001
- Developer: AOL
- Release: May 1997; 29 years ago
- Written in: C++; Adobe Flash
- Operating system: Microsoft Windows; Windows Mobile; macOS; Android; iOS; BlackBerry OS; Android TV
- Type: Instant messaging
- License: Proprietary

AOL Instant Messenger (AIM, sometimes stylized as aim) was an instant messaging and presence information computer program created by AOL that operated from 1997 to 2017. It used the proprietary OSCAR instant messaging protocol and the TOC protocol to allow users to communicate in real time.

AIM launched in May 1997 and became popular by the late 1990s; teens and college students were known to use the messenger's away message feature to keep in touch with friends, often frequently changing their away message throughout a day or leaving a message up with one's computer left on to inform buddies of their ongoings, location, parties, thoughts, or jokes.

AIM's popularity declined during the 2000s and 2010s as AOL subscribers started decreasing and as Gmail's Google Talk, SMS, and Internet social networks like Facebook gained popularity. Its fall has often been compared with other once-popular Internet services, such as Myspace. In June 2015, AOL was acquired by Verizon Communications. In June 2017, Verizon combined AOL and Yahoo into its subsidiary Oath Inc. (now called Yahoo). The company discontinued AIM as a service on December 15, 2017.

== History ==
In May 1997, AIM was released unceremoniously as a stand-alone download for Microsoft Windows. AIM was an outgrowth of "online messages" in the original platform written in PL/1 on a Stratus computer by Dave Brown. At one time, the software had the largest share of the instant messaging market in North America, especially in the United States (with 52% of the total reported as of 2006). This does not include other instant messaging software related to or developed by AOL, such as ICQ and iChat.

During its heyday, its main competitors were ICQ (which AOL acquired in 1998), Yahoo! Messenger and MSN Messenger. AOL particularly had a rivalry or "chat war" with PowWow and Microsoft, starting in 1999. There were several attempts from Microsoft to simultaneously log into their own and AIM's protocol servers. AOL was unhappy about this and started blocking MSN Messenger from being able to access AIM. This led to efforts by many companies to challenge the AOL and Time Warner merger on the grounds of antitrust behaviour, leading to the formation of the OpenNet Coalition.

AIM version 6.8 (released 2008)

Official mobile versions of AIM appeared as early as 2001 on Palm OS through the AOL application. Third-party applications allowed it to be used in 2002 for the Sidekick. A version for Symbian OS was announced in 2003, as were others for BlackBerry and Windows Mobile.

After 2012, stand-alone official AIM client software included advertisements and was available for Microsoft Windows, Windows Mobile, Classic Mac OS, macOS, Android, iOS, and BlackBerry OS.

=== Usage decline and product sunset ===
After seeing its popularity peak between 1999 and 2005, AIM began to very slowly lose its daily active user base starting with the widespread adoption of SMS text messaging in the United States that had occurred over the same period. This was further compounded by the gradual rise of Google's Gmail service (specifically the 2005 introduction of Google Talk, its built-in real-time chat feature) between 2004 and 2010. By 2011, apps like Apple iMessage, social network messaging apps like Facebook Messenger, and mobile-first messaging apps such as WhatsApp had greatly reduced the user base of AIM and other desktop-centric competitors of its generation. AOL sought to compete by adding features such as integration with Google Talk and enabling inbound and outbound SMS text messaging between AIM and any mobile number.

Windows version of AIM (2013 release)

Despite this, one source reported in June 2011 that AOL Instant Messenger's market share had collapsed to 0.73%. However, this number only reflected installed IM applications, and not active users. The engineers responsible for AIM claimed that they were unable to convince AOL management that free was the future.

On March 3, 2012, AOL laid-off most of AIM's development staff while leaving the service active with help support still provided. On October 6, 2017, it was announced that the AIM service would be completely discontinued on December 15, 2017; however, a non-profit development team known as Wildman Productions started up a server for older versions of AOL Instant Messenger, known as AIM Phoenix.

== The "Running Man" ==
The "Running Man"

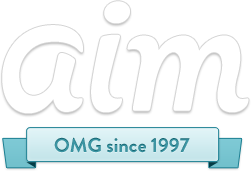
AIM's logo introduced in December 2011, replacing the earlier "running man" mascot

The AIM mascot was designed by JoRoan Lazaro and was implemented in the first release in 1997. This was a yellow stickman-like figure, often called the "Running Man". AIM's popularity in the late 1990s and the 2000s led to the “Running Man” becoming a familiar brand on the Internet. After over 14 years, the iconic logo disappeared as part of the AIM rebranding in 2011. However, in August 2013, the "Running Man" returned. It was used for other AOL services like AOL Top Speed. It is still featured in a theme on AOL Mail and seen on the AOL.com homepage to promote the AOL Today newsletter.

In 2014, a Complex editor called it a "symbol of America". In April 2015, the Running Man was officially featured in the Virgin London Marathon, dressed by a person for the AOL-partnered Free The Children charity.

== Protocol ==
The standard protocol that AIM clients used to communicate is called Open System for CommunicAtion in Realtime (OSCAR). Most AOL-produced versions of AIM and popular third party AIM clients use this protocol. However, AOL also created a simpler protocol called TOC that lacks many of OSCAR's features, but was sometimes used for clients that only require basic chat functionality. The TOC/TOC2 protocol specifications were made available by AOL, while OSCAR is a closed protocol that third parties had to reverse-engineer.

In January 2008, AOL introduced experimental Extensible Messaging and Presence Protocol (XMPP) support for AIM, allowing AIM users to communicate using the standardized, open-source XMPP. However, in March 2008, this service was discontinued. In May 2011, AOL started offering limited XMPP support. On March 1, 2017, AOL announced (via XMPP-login-time messages) that the AOL XMPP gateway would be desupported, effective March 28, 2017.

== Privacy ==
For privacy regulations, AIM had strict age restrictions. AIM accounts are available only for people over the age of 13; children younger than that were not permitted access to AIM. Under the AIM Privacy Policy, AOL had no rights to read or monitor any private communications between users. The profile of the user had no privacy.

In November 2002, AOL targeted the corporate industry with Enterprise AIM Services (EAS), a higher security version of AIM.

If public content was accessed, it could be used for online, print or broadcast advertising, etc. This was outlined in the policy and terms of service: "... you grant AOL, its parent, affiliates, subsidiaries, assigns, agents and licensees the irrevocable, perpetual, worldwide right to reproduce, display, perform, distribute, adapt and promote this Content in any medium". This allowed anything users posted to be used without a separate request for permission.

AIM's security was called into question. AOL stated that it had taken great pains to ensure that personal information will not be accessed by unauthorized members, but that it cannot guarantee that it will not happen.

AIM was different from other clients, such as Yahoo! Messenger, in that it did not require approval from users to be added to other users' buddy lists. As a result, it was possible for users to keep other unsuspecting users on their buddy list to see when they were online, read their status and away messages, and read their profiles. There was also a Web API to display one's status and away message as a widget on one's webpage. Though one could block a user from communicating with them and seeing their status, this did not prevent that user from creating a new account that would not automatically be blocked and therefore able to track their status. A more conservative privacy option was to select a menu feature that only allowed communication with users on one's buddy list; however, this option also created the side-effect of blocking all users who were not on one's buddy list. Users could also choose to be invisible to all.

On November 4, 2014, AIM scored one out of seven points on the Electronic Frontier Foundation's secure messaging scorecard. AIM received a point for encryption during transit, but lost points because communications are not encrypted with a key to which the provider has no access, i.e., the communications are not end-to-end encrypted, users can't verify contacts' identities, past messages are not secure if the encryption keys are stolen, (i.e., the service does not provide forward secrecy), the code is not open to independent review, (i.e., the code is not open-source), the security design is not properly documented, and there has not been a recent independent security audit. BlackBerry Messenger (BBM), Ebuddy XMS, Hushmail, Kik Messenger, Skype, Viber, and Yahoo! Messenger also scored one out of seven points.

== Chat robots ==
AOL and various other companies supplied robots (bots) on AIM that could receive messages and send a response based on the bot's purpose. For example, bots could help with studying, like StudyBuddy. Some were made to relate to children and teenagers, like Spleak.

Others gave advice. The more useful chat bots had features like the ability to play games, get sport scores, weather forecasts or financial stock information. Users were able to talk to automated chat bots that could respond to natural human language. They were primarily put into place as a marketing strategy and for unique advertising options. It was used by advertisers to market products or build better consumer relations.

Before the inclusions of such bots, the other bots DoorManBot and AIMOffline provided features that were provided by AOL for those who needed it. ZolaOnAOL and ZoeOnAOL were short-lived bots that ultimately retired their features in favor of SmarterChild.

== URI scheme ==
AOL Instant Messenger's installation process automatically installed an extra URI scheme ("protocol") handler into some Web browsers, so URIs beginning with aim: could open a new AIM window with specified parameters. This was similar in function to the mailto: URI scheme, which created a new e-mail message using the system's default mail program. For instance, a webpage might have included a link like the following in its HTML source to open a window for sending a message to the AIM user notarealuser:

<a href="aim:goim?screenname=notarealuser">Send Message</a>

To specify a message body, the message parameter was used, so the link location would have looked like this:

aim:goim?screenname=notarealuser&message=This+is+my+message

To specify an away message, the message parameter was used, so the link location would have looked like this:

aim:goaway?message=Hello,+my+name+is+Bill

When placing this inside a URL link, an AIM user could click on the URL link and the away message "Hello, my name is Bill" would instantly become their away message.

To add a buddy, the addbuddy message was used, with the "screenname" parameter

aim:addbuddy?screenname=notarealuser

This type of link was commonly found on forum profiles to easily add contacts.

== Vulnerabilities ==
AIM had security weaknesses that have enabled exploits to be created that used third-party software to perform malicious acts on users' computers. Although most were relatively harmless, such as being kicked off the AIM service, others performed potentially dangerous actions, such as sending viruses. Some of these exploits relied on social engineering to spread by automatically sending instant messages that contained a Uniform Resource Locator (URL) accompanied by text suggesting the receiving user click on it, an action which leads to infection, i.e., a trojan horse. These messages could easily be mistaken as coming from a friend and contain a link to a Web address that installed software on the user's computer to restart the cycle.

== Extra features ==
=== iPhone application ===
On March 6, 2008, during Apple's iPhone SDK event, AOL announced that they would be releasing an AIM application for iPhone and iPod Touch users. The application was available for free from the App Store, but the company also provided a paid version, which displayed no advertisements. Both were available from the App Store. The AIM client for iPhone and iPod Touch supported standard AIM accounts, as well as MobileMe accounts. There was also an express version of AIM accessible through the Safari browser on the iPhone and iPod Touch.

In 2011, AOL launched an overhaul of their Instant Messaging service. Included in the update was a brand new iOS application for iPhone and iPod Touch that incorporated all the latest features. A brand new icon was used for the application, featuring the new cursive logo for AIM. The user-interface was entirely redone for the features including: a new buddy list, group messaging, in-line photos and videos, as well as improved file-sharing.

Version 5.0.5, updated in March 2012, it supported more social stream features, much like Facebook and Twitter, as well as the ability to send voice messages up to 60 seconds long.

=== iPad application ===
On April 3, 2010, Apple released the first generation iPad. Along with this newly released device AOL released the AIM application for iPad. It was built entirely from scratch for the new version of iOS with a specialized user-interface for the device. It supported geolocation, Facebook status updates and chat, Myspace, Twitter, YouTube, Foursquare, and many other social networking platforms.

=== AIM Express ===
AIM Express ran in a pop-up browser window. It was intended for use by people who are unwilling or unable to install a standalone application or those at computers that lack the AIM application. AIM Express supported many of the standard features included in the stand-alone client, but did not provide advanced features like file transfer, audio chat, video conferencing, or buddy info. It was implemented in Adobe Flash. It was an upgrade to the prior AOL Quick Buddy, which was later available for older systems that cannot handle Express before being discontinued. Express and Quick Buddy were similar to MSN Web Messenger and Yahoo! Web Messenger. This web version evolved into AIM.com's web-based messenger.

=== AIM Pages ===
AIM Pages was a free website released in May 2006 by AOL in replacement of AIMSpace. Anyone who had an AIM user name and was at least 16 years of age could create their own web page (to display an online, dynamic profile) and share it with buddies from their AIM Buddy list.

AIM Pages included links to the email and Instant Message of the owner, along with a section listing the owners "buddies", which included AIM user names. It was possible to create modules in a Module T microformat. Video hosting sites like Netflix and YouTube could be added to ones AIM Page, as well as other sites like Amazon.com. It was also possible to insert HTML code.

The main focus of AIM Pages was the integration of external modules, like those listed above, into the AOL Instant Messenger experience.

By late 2007, AIM Pages were discontinued. After AIM Pages shutdown, links to AIM Pages were redirected to AOL Lifestream, AOL's new site aimed at collecting external modules in one place, independent of AIM buddies. AOL Lifestream was shut down February 24, 2017.

=== AIM for Mac ===
AOL released an all-new AIM for the Mac on September 29, 2008, and the final build on December 15, 2008. The redesigned AIM for Mac is a full universal binary Cocoa API application that supports both Tiger and Leopard—Mac OS X 10.4.8 (and above) or Mac OS X 10.5.3 (and above). On October 1, 2009, AOL released AIM 2.0 for Mac.

=== AIM real-time IM ===
This feature was available for AIM 7 and allowed for a user to see what the other is typing as it is being done. It was developed and built with assistance from Trace Research and Development Centre at University of Wisconsin–Madison and Gallaudet University. The application provides visually impaired users the ability to convert messages from text (words) to speech. For the application to work users must have AIM 6.8 or higher, as it is not compatible with older versions of AIM software, AIM for Mac or iChat.

=== AIM to mobile (messaging to phone numbers) ===
This feature allows text messaging to a phone number (text messaging is less functional than instant messaging).

=== AIM Phoneline ===
AIM Phoneline was a Voice over IP PC-PC, PC-Phone and Phone-to-PC service provided via the AIM application. It was also known to work with Apple's iChat Client. Launched on May 16, 2006, AIM Phoneline provided users the ability to have several local numbers, allowing AIM users to receive free incoming calls. The service allowed users to make calls to landlines and mobile devices through the use of a computer. The service, however, was only free for receiving and AOL charged users $14.95 a month for an unlimited calling plan. In order to use AIM Phoneline users had to install the latest free version of AIM Triton software and needed a good set of headphones with a boom microphone. It could take several days after a user signed up before it started working.

The service was officially closed on January 13, 2009. The closing of the free service caused the number associated with the service to be disabled and not transferable for a different service. AIM Phoneline website recommended users switch to a new service named AIM Call Out.

=== AIM Call Out ===
AIM Call Out was a Voice over IP PC-PC, PC-Phone and Phone-to-PC service provided by AOL via its AIM application that replaced the defunct AIM Phoneline service in November 2007. It did not depend on the AIM client and could be used with only an AIM screenname via the WebConnect feature or a dedicated SIP device. The AIM Call Out service was shut down on March 25, 2009.

== See also ==
- Comparison of cross-platform instant messaging clients
- List of defunct instant messaging platforms
