= AMSN =

Instant messaging client

aMSN

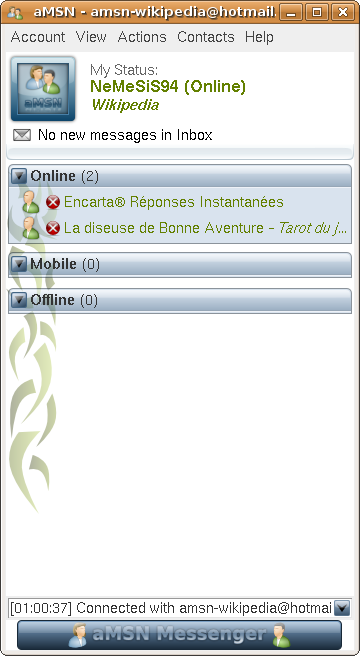
- Screenshot aMSN 0.97 screenshot
- Developer(s): aMSN Development Team
- Initial release: May 22, 2002
- Final release: 0.98.9 / May 25, 2012; 13 years ago
- Written in: Tcl/Tk
- Operating system: Multi-platform
- Type: Instant messaging client
- License: GNU General Public License
- Website: http://www.amsn-project.net/ (defunct)

aMSN was a free Windows Live Messenger clone. aMSN attempted to emulate the look and feel of Windows Live Messenger, and supported many of its features. It had been downloaded approximately 40 million times as of January 2011, making it the 21st most downloaded project on SourceForge.

aMSN was available for any system that supports Tcl/Tk 8.5 or higher, including Microsoft Windows, Macintosh and any UNIX/Linux variant, including Maemo (Nokia's internet tablets) and OpenSolaris. A portable version for Windows is available by PortableApps.

== History ==
aMSN was based on a previous application named Compu's Messenger (ccmsn), released on September 21, 2001, by Dave Mifsud. Features in this application were quite limited and development seemed to be stopped. Alvaro Iradier made a fork of the development with his own version, aMSN (Alvaro's Messenger). At the time Didimo E. Grimaldo was also working on his own branch of ccMSN until both Alvaro and Didimo heard of each other in a development forum and decided to merge their improvements into one version. The first version of aMSN was released on May 22, 2002, on SourceForge.

After several successful releases of their join effort, Didimo E. Grimaldo decided to take leave as a developer due to other pressing responsibilities and lack of time. ccMSN/aMSN was in fact the last of several free and open source projects in which Didimo worked.

More developers joined the project, like Philippe G. Khalaf and later Youness Alaoui. In 2012, the project kept going thanks to the effort and help of an increasing number of developers, translators, and designers.

aMSN was well known for quickly implementing most of the official client's features, often being the only third-party client that supported them. For example, it was the only client that supported video conferencing on Mac. It has been reviewed by many software-specialized websites. Its releases have appeared on several well-known blogs, its developers have been interviewed, and it has even appeared on a few TV series internationally.

== Removal of video call and webcam functionality ==
With the release of Windows Live Messenger 2009, Microsoft made changes to the protocol used by Windows Live Messenger. These changes included the use of P2P-SIP instead of using an external server. As a result of this, the video call function to aMSN was made unusable and was removed from versions 0.98.3 and 0.98.4 of aMSN.

In late 2010, Microsoft released Windows Live Messenger 2011, which removed one-way webcam functionality, meaning that aMSN was left with no practical webcam function.

== Features ==
Features present in the Microsoft client

- Support for the MSN Protocol 15 (although it also allows use of both old and new protocols)
- Personal messages;
- "What I'm listening to" personal messages (from a third-party plugin; includes support for music programs like Amarok or XMMS in Linux);
- Contact list and display name retrieval from Microsoft servers;
- Offline messaging (fully functional in development release);
- Logging in under any status;
- File transfers, sending and receiving;
- Replication of Windows Live Messenger's look and feel;
- Nudges (included as a plugin where you may adjust various options);
- Winks (from a third-party plugin);
- Full voice and video conversations (no longer available due to changes in Microsoft SIP servers);
- Sending and receiving of voice clips;
- Webcam send and receive; (No longer functional due to removal from official client)
- Display pictures, including a manager that saves old display pictures like the one in the official client;
- Chat logging;
- Ability to start a conversation while appearing offline;
- Support for email checking. A plugin allowing the program to check non-hotmail POP3 addresses is also available;
- Complete emoticon support, including custom emoticons;
- Group conversations.

Extra features not present in the Microsoft client

- Custom statuses that can include auto-messages for when user is away;
- Skins;
- Tabbed chat windows;
- Games that can be played between two aMSN clients (from a plugin);
- Plugins offer various other features as well;
- ~~Shows when contacts don't have you on their list, as well as contacts that have you on their list but are not in yours;~~
  - This was no longer possible since Microsoft fixed this bug in its protocol. Note that newly added contacts will show up as if they don't have you in their list, but older contacts will show up as they have you in their list.
- Webcam sessions recording;
- Encrypted chats (from the third-party Kryptonite plugin);
- Automatic storing of contacts' display pictures;
- A chat window pops up when the other person opens a window with you, even if they haven't typed anything yet;
- A message in the chat window informs you when the person closes their chat window.

== See also ==
- Comparison of instant messaging clients
