= Comparison of instant messaging protocols =

The following is a comparison of instant messaging protocols. It contains basic general information about the protocols.

== Table of instant messaging protocols ==
Protocol	Creator	First public release date	License	Identity (not inc. alias)	Asynchronous message relaying	Transport Layer Security	End-to-end encryption	Unlimited number of contacts	Bulletins to all contacts	One-to-many routing (Note: One-to-many/many-to-many communications primarily comprise presence information, publish/subscribe and groupchat distribution. Some technologies have the ability to distribute data by multicast, avoiding bottlenecks on the sending side caused by the number of recipients. Efficient distribution of presence is currently however a technological scalability issue for both XMPP and SIP/SIMPLE.)	Spam protection	Group, channel or conference support	Audio/VoIP support	Webcam/Video	Batch file sharing	Media synchronization	Serverless (Note: Serverless protocols don't have any central entities (usually companies) controlling the network. Serverless network consists only of clients. Such systems are usually extremely resistant to surveillance and censorship.)	Protocol
3GPP standards	Friedhelm Hillebrand	1985	Proprietary	Phone number (e.g. +15550123)	Yes	No	No	About 250 contacts in SIM, unlimited from phone.	No	serial messages	Medium	No	Yes	3G-324M/ViLTE	RCS	No	?	3GPP standards
Bitmessage	Jonathan Warren	2012 Nov	Open standard	Alphanumeric address	Yes	Yes	Yes	Yes	No	Yes	Yes (through proof-of-work)	Yes	No	No	Yes	No	Yes	Bitmessage
Bonjour	Apple Inc.	2002 August	Proprietary Freeware; portions under the Apache license	Username	No	No	No	Yes	No	multicast	Medium	No	No	No	Yes	No	Yes	Bonjour
Briar	Briarproject.org	2018 May 9	Open standard	Public & Private key (via QR Codes)	Yes	Yes	Yes	Yes	Yes	Yes	Yes	Yes	No	No	No	No	Yes	Briar
Discord	Discord Inc.	2015 May 13	Proprietary	Discord ID	Yes	No	No	No	No	?	Medium	?	Yes	Yes	Yes	?	No	Discord
dm3	corpus.io / dm3.network	2022	Open Source (BSD)	ENS (Ethereum Name Service)	Yes	Yes	Yes	Yes	Yes	Yes	Yes	Yes	No	No	No	Yes	Yes	dm3
Echo	spot-on.sf.net / goldbug.sf.net	2013	Open standard	Key	Yes	Optional	Yes	Yes	Yes	Yes	Yes	Yes	No	No	Yes	Yes	Yes	Echo
Gadu-Gadu	GG Network	2000 Jul 17	Proprietary	UIN e.g. 12345678	Yes	Yes	No	Yes	No	Centralistic	Yes (Note: There have been reports from users that the antispam filter is used to censor links to other IM programs and some websites.) (simple)	Yes	Yes	Yes	Yes	No	No	Gadu-Gadu
IRC	Jarkko Oikarinen	1988 Aug	Open standard	Nickname!Username@hostname (or "hostmask") e.g. user!~usr@a.b.com (Note: In ~usr@a.b.com, the a.b.com part is known as the "hostmask" and can either be the server being connected from or a "cloak" granted by the server administrator; a more realistic example is ~myname@myisp.example.com. The tilde generally indicates that the username provided by the IRC client on signon was not verified with the ident service.)	Yes, via IRCv3 or MemoServ that differs from the main system	Optional	Many implementations which are mostly non-interoperable with other IRC clients	No (Note: Scalability issue: The protocol gets increasingly inefficient with the number of contacts.)	No	Simplistic multicast	Medium	Yes (everyone, multiple simultaneous, any size)	many implementations which are incompatible with other IRC clients	No	Yes	via BNC	yes, via DCC CHAT	IRC
Jami (based on DHT and SIP)	Savoir-faire Linux Inc.	2002 August	Open Standard	40-digit address	Yes	Yes	Yes	Yes	No	Yes	Medium	Yes	Yes	Yes	Yes	No	Yes	Jami (based on DHT and SIP)
Matrix	Matrix.org	2014 Sep	Open standard	@Username:Hostname (MXID)	Yes	Yes, mandatory	Yes, default for private conversations	Yes	Yes	Yes	Yes (using pluggable server-side filtering modules and contact ignoring)	Yes	Yes	Yes	Yes	Yes	No (not yet but there is ongoing work on a p2p version: https://arewep2pyet.com/	Matrix
Mattermost	Mattermost Inc	2015 October 2	Open standard															Mattermost
MSNP (Windows Live Messenger, etc.)	Microsoft	1999 Jul	Proprietary	Email address (Microsoft account)	Yes	No	No	Only for certified robots	No	Centralistic	Yes	Yes	Yes	Yes	Yes	Yes	No	MSNP (Windows Live Messenger, etc.)
MTProto (Telegram)	Telegram Messenger LLP	2013 Aug	Open standard	Phone number (e.g. +15550123), nickname (e.g. @example)	Yes	Yes	No end-to-end encryption for group chats	Yes	No	Yes	Yes, contact blocking	Yes	Yes	Yes	Yes	Yes	No	MTProto (Telegram)
Mumble	Thorvald Natvig	1999 Jul	Open standard	Username	Yes	Yes	No	Only for certified robots	No	Centralistic	Yes	Yes	Yes	No	Yes	No	No	Mumble
LINE	LY Corporation	2011 June 23	Proprietary	LINE ID, Phone Number														LINE
OSCAR (AIM, ICQ)	AOL	1997	Proprietary (Discontinued 15-Dec-2017)	Username, Email Address or UIN e.g. 12345678	Yes	Yes (Aim Pro, Aim Lite)	No	No	No	Centralistic	client-based	Yes (Multiple, simultaneous)	Yes	Yes	Yes	No	No	OSCAR (AIM, ICQ)
Stoat	Stoat	2021	AGPLv3	Username and discriminator (e.g. MysticPixie#7495)	Yes	Yes	No					Yes	Yes	Yes	Yes		No	Stoat
RVP (Windows Messenger, etc.)	Microsoft	1997 Mar	Proprietary (Discontinued)	Windows Active Directory Login	No	No	?	No	Centralistic	None	No	?	?	No	No	No		RVP (Windows Messenger, etc.)
Ricochet	Invisible.im	2014 Mar	Open standard	Tor onion address	Yes	Yes	Yes	Yes	No	Yes	Yes	Yes	No	No	Yes	No	Yes	Ricochet
Serval Project	Serval Project	2016	Open Standard	Digit address	Yes	No	Yes	Yes	Yes	Yes	No	No	Yes	Yes	Yes	Yes	Yes	Serval Project
Signal Protocol	Signal Foundation	2014 Feb	Open standard	Phone number (e.g. +15550123), username with two added random trailing numbers (e.g. @example.12)	Yes	Yes	Yes	Yes	?	Yes	Yes, client-side contact blocking; server-side protections	Yes	Yes	Yes	Yes	Yes	No	Signal Protocol
SIP/SIMPLE	IETF	1996	Open standard	user@hostname	Yes	Yes	Optional	Yes	Yes	No	Medium	?	Yes	Yes	Yes	No	Depends on implementation	SIP/SIMPLE
Skype	Skype	2003 Aug	Proprietary (Discontinued)	Username	Yes	Proprietary	No	No	No	Centralistic	client-based	Yes	Yes	Yes	Yes	No	No	Skype
Steam Friends	Valve	2003 Sep 12	Proprietary	SteamID/Username or Unique Number	Yes	Proprietary	?	No, although rising	Yes	?	No	Yes	Yes	No	No	No	No	Steam Friends
TeamSpeak	TeamSpeak Systems GmbH	2001 Aug	Proprietary	Unique ID in base64	No	No	No	?	?	?	?	Yes	Yes	No				TeamSpeak
TOC2	AOL	2005 Sep	Proprietary (Discontinued)	Username or UIN e.g. 12345678	Yes	No	No	No	No	Centralistic	No	paying members only	?	?	Partial	?	No	TOC2
Threema	Threema GmbH	2012 December	Open standard															Threema
TOX (based on DHT)	irungentoo (GitHub user)	2013 June	GNU General Public License (GPL) version 3 or later	Public & Private key	Yes	Yes	Yes	Yes	Yes	Yes	Yes	Yes	Yes	Yes	Yes	Yes	Yes	TOX (based on DHT)
Tuenti	Tuenti	2006	Proprietary	Username	Yes	Yes	No	Yes	?	Yes	Yes	Yes	Yes	Yes	Yes	?	No	Tuenti
WeChat	Tencent	2011	Proprietary	Username	Yes	Yes	No	Yes	Yes	Yes	No	Yes	Yes	Yes	No	No	No	WeChat
Windows Messenger service	Microsoft	1990	Proprietary (Discontinued)	NetBIOS	Yes	No	No	Yes	Yes	Yes	No	No	No	No	No	No	No	Windows Messenger service
XMPP	Jeremie Miller, standardized via IETF	1999 Jan	Open standard	Jabber ID (JID) e.g. usr@a.b.c/home (Note: In usr@a.b.c/home, the home part is a "resource", which distinguishes the same user when logged in from multiple locations, possibly simultaneously; a more realistic example is user@xmppserver.example.com/home.)	Yes	Yes	Optional	Yes	Yes	Yes	Yes	Yes	Yes, via Jingle	Yes, via Jingle	Yes	Yes	Optional	XMPP
YMSG (Yahoo! Messenger)	Yahoo!	1998, March 9	Proprietary (Discontinued)	Username	Yes	No	No	No	Yes	Centralistic	Yes	Yes	Yes	Yes	Yes	No	No	YMSG (Yahoo! Messenger)
Zephyr Notification Service	MIT	1987	Open standard	Kerberos principal e.g. user@ATHENA.MIT.EDU	Yes	No	No	Yes	Yes	Yes	No	Yes	No	No	No	No	No	Zephyr Notification Service
Protocol	Creator	First public release date	License	Identity (not inc. alias)	Asynchronous message relaying	Transport Layer Security	End-to-end encryption	Unlimited number of contacts	Bulletins to all contacts	One-to-many routing	Spam protection	Group, channel or conference support	Audio/VoIP support	Webcam/Video	Batch file sharing	Media synchronization	Serverless (decentralized)	Protocol

== See also ==
- Comparison of cross-platform instant messaging clients
- Comparison of IRC clients
- Comparison of LAN messengers
- Comparison of software and protocols for federated social networking
- LAN messenger
- Instant messaging
- Comparison of user features of messaging platforms
