= Windows Messenger service =

Local network notification service for Microsoft Windows

WinPopup, shown in the background, first appeared in Windows for Workgroups, together with several other network applications.

Messenger service was a network-based system notification Windows service by Microsoft that was included in some earlier versions of Microsoft Windows.

This retired technology, although it has a similar name, is not related in any way to the later, Internet-based Microsoft Messenger service for instant messaging or to Windows Messenger and Windows Live Messenger (formerly named MSN Messenger) client software.

== Utilities ==

WinPopup sends messages from one Windows computer to another on the same LAN. It is available in all Windows versions from Windows for Workgroups (Ver 3.11) to Windows ME, but has never been included with Windows NT-based operating systems. WinPopup works by means of the NetBEUI protocol.

There is also a port to Linux with an extended feature called LinPopUp, which allows adding Linux computers to the set. Linpopup is an X Window graphical port of Winpopup, and a package for Debian linux. It runs over Samba. Linpopup does not have to run all the time, can run minimized, and its messages are encrypted with a strong cypher. The traditional Unix functional equivalent of WinPopUp would be the wall and write commands.

== Uses ==
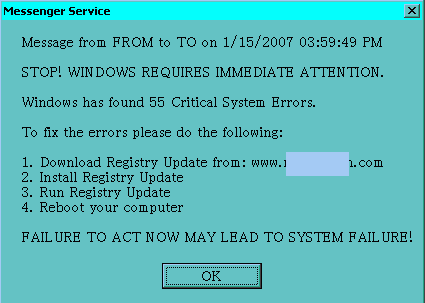
Example of Messenger service spam from 2007

The Messenger Service was originally designed for use by system administrators to notify Windows users about their networks. It was used maliciously to present pop-up advertisements to users over the Internet (by using mass-messaging systems which sent a desired message to a specified range of IP addresses). Even though Windows XP included a firewall, it was not enabled by default. Because of this, many users received such messages. As a result of this abuse, the Messenger Service was disabled by default in Windows XP Service Pack 2.

The Messenger Service was discontinued in Windows Vista and Windows Server 2008 and replaced by the old MSG.exe.

== Architecture ==
The Messenger service in Windows 2000 and Windows XP uses the NetBIOS over TCP/IP (NetBT) protocol. The service waits for a message, then it displays it onscreen. The alternative way to send a message is to write it to a MailSlot named messngr. It requires UDP ports 135, 137, and 138 and TCP ports 135, 139, and 445 to work. If access to the ports from outside a network is not blocked, it can lead to the aforementioned spam issue. In Windows NT 3.5, NT 3.51 and NT 4.0, Messenger used the older NetBIOS protocol. (NetBIOS is not installed with Windows 2000.)

In the past Messenger service can be used by either Net Send command from a command-line interface. In addition, the Alerter service uses Messenger to send administrative alerts to network subscribers. You have to be part of a domain, not a workgroup.

== See also ==
- Comparison of LAN messengers
- LAN messenger – Local instant messaging program
- List of Microsoft Windows components
- Messaging spam
