= Fetion =

Instant messaging software

- Developer: China Mobile
- Release: May 2007
- Operating system: Android, iOS, J2ME, OS X, Symbian, Windows, Windows Phone
- Available in: Chinese (Simplified & Traditional)
- Type: Instant messenger; SMS gateway client
- Licence: Proprietary
- Website: www.hk.chinamobile.com/en/data-n-vas/message_n_email/data-n-vas-fetion.html feixin.10086.cn

Fetion (Chinese:飞信, pinyin: fēi xìn, lit. flying letter) was an instant messaging (IM) client developed by China Mobile, a Chinese telecommunications company. It allows users to send and receive SMS free of charge between PCs and mobile phones (in certain conditions). China Mobile intends to develop Fetion into a comprehensive communications service which will focus on wireless communications and offer the Internet applications as a complement. D-media Communication Tech (a subsidiary company of Ultrapower Software Co., Ltd) undertakes construction, operation and maintain of Fetion.

Fetion was shut down on 30 September 2022.

== History ==
Shenzhou Taiyue (SZSE: 300002) was originally the only supplier of the outsourcing development, operation and support for Fetion. However, every time the company attempted to renew its contract with China Mobile, it was hit with rumours of insider trading, contract terminations and unstable performance resulting in sharp fluctuations in its share price. China Mobile subsequently put four sub-projects out to tender and Shenzhou Taiyue lost its monopoly.

== Usage ==
Rumoured to have been called "Femoo" before launch, the product was renamed "Fetion", since in Chinese "Femoo" sounds like the word for "tomb" (坟墓; fénmù) and has negative connotations. In 2012 the service had around 90 million active users and income of around 300 million renminbi. Providers of over-the-top content (OTT) have complained that Fetion has failed to address the fee structure changes required to counter competition from other services including WeChat.

== See also ==
- Comparison of cross-platform instant messaging clients
- Comparison of instant messaging protocols
- Comparison of Internet Relay Chat clients
- Comparison of LAN messengers
- Comparison of VoIP software
- List of SIP software
- List of video telecommunication services and product brands
