= BORGChat =

- Developer: Ionut Cioflan
- Stable release: v1.0.0 b438 (March 31, 2007; 18 years ago) [±]
- Operating system: Windows 98/Me, 2000, XP
- Type: LAN Messaging clients
- License: Proprietary / Freeware
- Website: borgchat.softnews.ro

BORGChat is a LAN messaging software program. It has achieved a relative state of popularity and it is considered to be a complete LAN chat program. It has been superseded by commercial products which allow voice chat, video conferencing, central monitoring and administration. An extension called "BORGVoice" adds word producing chat capabilities to BORGChat, the extension remains in alpha stage.

== History ==
BORGChat was first published from Ionut Cioflan (nickname "IOn") in 2002. The name comes from the BORG race from Star Trek: The Borg is a massive society of cybernetic automatons abducted and assimilated from thousands of species. The Borg collective improves by consuming technologies, in a similar way wishes BORGChat to "assimilate".

== Features ==
The software supports the following features:

- Public and private chat rooms (channels), support for own chat rooms
- Avatars with user information and online alerts
- Sending private messages
- Sending files and pictures, with pause and bandwidth management
- Animated smileys (emoticons) and sound effects (beep)
- View computers and network shares
- Discussion logs in the LAN
- Message filter, ignore messages from other users
- Message board with Bulletin Board Code (bold, italic, underline)
- Multiple chat status modes: Available/Busy/Away with customizable messages
- Multi language support (with the possibility of adding more languages): English, Romanian, Swedish, Spanish, Polish, Slovak, Italian, Bulgarian, German, Russian, Turkish, Ukrainian, Slovenian, Czech, Danish, French, Latvian, Portuguese, Urdu, Dutch, Hungarian, Serbian, Macedonian.

== See also ==
- Synchronous conferencing
- Comparison of LAN messengers
