= Threedegrees =

threedegrees or 3° (frequently referred to as Three Degrees) was a communication and P2P application produced by Microsoft. It allowed the user to sign in using a .NET Passport and integrated into MSN Messenger. It sorted buddies into groups, and allowed initiating group chats in MSN Messenger, and sharing of pictures, listening to a shared playlist and sending animated winks.

threedegrees is now discontinued and certain features provided by the software have been partially integrated into MSN Messenger 7. threedegrees used to only run under Windows XP Service Packs 1 and 2, with a custom IPv6 stack installed.

threedegrees had a concept of being able to stream music between multiple users like a miniature radio station. However, despite other new features being included in MSN Messenger 7, this feature was never released due to large copyright issues that would be faced by Microsoft. MSN Messenger does, however, now enable other users to see what their buddy is listening to and is linked to a website providing this music if needed, a concept spurred by this idea.

The threedegrees product was conceived and produced by an internal startup at Microsoft called the Netgen team. The team was unique in that it was an internal startup inside of Microsoft, set away from the software giant's Redmond campus in separate offices in downtown Seattle and staffed mostly with college graduates tasked to create a product "for themselves". The team was chronicled in Newsweek on February 24, 2003 by writer Steven Levy in his article "Microsoft Gets A Clue From Its Kiddie Corps". While the threedegrees product never reached mass adoption, it represented one of Microsoft's early attempts to revitalize its MSN division through the creation of an incubator team outside of the company's main R&D structure.
