= Line (software) =

Freeware instant communications app

- Developers: Line Corporation (2011–2023); LY Corporation (2023–present)
- Release: June 23, 2011

Stable release(s)
- Android: 26.6.1 / 7 May 2026; 6 months ago
- iOS: 26.6.0 / 7 May 2026; 6 months ago
- Windows: 9.8.0.3597 / 26 September 2025; 13 months ago
- macOS: 26.1.0 / 3 March 2026; 8 months ago
- Chrome: 3.7.2 / 24 February 2026; 8 months ago
- Operating system: Operating system: Android: 7.0 and later; iOS: 16.0 and later; Windows: 10 and later; macOS: 10.14 and later
- Platform: Smartphone, PC, iPad, Smartwatch
- Size: Size: Android: 221.59 MB; iOS: 262.4 MB; Windows: 161 MB; macOS: 234.4 MB; Chrome: 4.91MiB
- Available in: 17 languages
- List of languages English, Japanese, Korean, Simplified Chinese, Traditional Chinese, Thai, Vietnamese, French, German, Italian, Spanish, Portuguese, Russian, Indonesian, Malay, Arabic, Turkish
- Type: Instant messaging, Social networking service
- License: Proprietary
- Website: line.me/en
- Repository: github.com/line

Line (stylized in all caps) is a Japanese freeware app and service for instant messaging and social networking, operated by the Japanese company LY Corporation, co-owned by SoftBank Group and Naver. Line was launched in Japan in June 2011 by NHN Japan, a subsidiary of Naver.

Initially designed for text messaging and VoIP voice and video calling, it has gradually expanded to become a super-app providing services including a digital wallet (Line Pay), news stream (Line Today), video on demand (Line TV) and digital comic distribution (Line Manga and Line Webtoon).

Line became Japan's largest social network in 2013 and is used by over 70% of the population as of 2023; it is also popular mainly in Indonesia, Taiwan and Thailand.

== History ==
=== Launch ===
Naver launched a messaging app called Naver Talk for the South Korean market in February 2011. However, rival Korean company Kakao dominated the market with its KakaoTalk app, launched in March 2010.

Naver/NHN co-founder and chairman Lee Hae-Jin and a team of engineers were in Japan when the Tōhoku earthquake and tsunami struck in March 2011. The earthquake and tsunami left millions without power and phone lines and SMS networks were overwhelmed. Since Wi-Fi and some 3G remained largely usable, many people turned to KakaoTalk, which was just beginning to gain a foothold in Japan. Lee was inspired to launch a messaging and chat app in the wake of the disaster and his NHN Japan team was testing a beta version of an app accessible on smartphones, tablet and PC, which would work on data network and provide continuous and free instant messaging and calling service, within two months. The app was launched as Line in June 2011.

Because Naver/NHN had a far superior cultural knowledge of what Japanese users wanted, and a much larger corporate marketing budget, Line quickly surpassed KakaoTalk in Japan. Line also offers free voice calls and, since Japan's telecoms make customers pay for both SMSs and smartphone calls, this feature, which KakaoTalk did not have, was a major selling point.

=== 2011–2015 ===
Line experienced an unexpected server overload in October 2011 due to the app's popularity. To improve scalability to accommodate its user growth, NHN Japan chose HBase as the primary storage for user profiles, contacts and groups. In December 2011, Naver announced that Naver Talk would be merged into Line, effective early 2012.

In July 2012, NHN Japan announced the new Line features Home and Timeline. The features allowed users to share recent personal developments to a community of contacts in real-time, similar to the status updates in social networking services such as Facebook. On April 1, 2013, Naver's Japanese branch name was changed from NHN Japan to Line Corporation.

Because it was tailored to Japanese consumers' tastes and offered free smartphone calls as well as texting, with the help of a massive marketing campaign it quickly outpaced its existing rival KakaoTalk for the Japanese market. It reached 100 million users within 18 months and 200 million users six months later. Line gradually replaced carrier-based email as the most popular method of communication in Japan.

Line became Japan's largest social network by the end of 2013, with more than 300 million registrants worldwide, of which more than 50 million users were within Japan. In October 2014, Line announced that it had attracted 560 million users worldwide with 170 million active user accounts. In February 2015, it announced the 600 million users mark had been passed and 700 million were expected by the end of the year.

Line was originally developed as a mobile application for Android and IOS smartphones. The service has since expanded to: BlackBerry OS (August 2012), Nokia Asha (Asia and Oceania, March 2013), Windows Phone (July 2013), Firefox OS (February 2014), iPadOS (October 2014) and as a Google Chrome App (via the Chrome Web Store). The application also exists in versions for laptop and desktop computers using the Microsoft Windows and macOS platforms.

=== Ownership ===
In July 2016, Line Corporation held IPOs on both the New York Stock Exchange and the Tokyo Stock Exchange.

In late December 2020, Line Corporation delisted from both the New York Stock Exchange and the Tokyo Stock Exchange, in advance of its absorption-type merger agreement with Z Holdings. On March 1, 2021, SoftBank Group affiliate and Yahoo! Japan operator Z Holdings completed a merger with Line Corporation. Under the new structure, A Holdings, a subsidiary of SoftBank Corporation and Naver Corporation, will own 65.3% of Z Holdings, which will operate Line and Yahoo! Japan.

== Market share ==
By 18 January 2013, Line had been downloaded 100 million times worldwide. The number expanded to 140 million by early July 2013 and to 200 million by July 21. As of June 2016, Japan claimed 68 million users while Thailand had 33 million. As of February 2014, Indonesia had 20 million users, Taiwan 17 million, while India and Spain had 16 million each. In April 2014, Naver announced that Line had reached 400 million worldwide users and by 2017 this had grown to 700 million. By 2025, the platform's monthly active users (MAU) reached approximately 194 million, with the user base primarily concentrated in Japan, Thailand, Taiwan, and Indonesia.

A survey done in 2023 showed that, for the first time, more Japanese seniors preferred to use Line over email for communicating.

== Features ==
Line is an application that works on multiple platforms and has access via multiple personal computer operating systems. Users can also share photos, videos and music, locations, voice recordings, emojis, stickers and emoticons with friends. Users can see a real-time confirmation when messages are sent and received or use a hidden chat feature, which can hide and delete a chat history (from both involved devices and Line servers) after a time set by the user.

The application also makes free voice and video calls. Users can also chat and share media in a group by creating and joining groups that have up to 500 people. Chats also provide bulletin boards on which users can post, like and comment. This application also has timeline and homepage features that allow users to post pictures, text and stickers on their homepages. Users can also change their Line theme to the theme Line provides in the theme shop for free or users can buy other famous cartoon characters they like. Line also has a feature, called a Snap movie, that users can use to record a stop-motion video and add in provided background music.

In January 2015, Line Taxi was released in Tokyo as a competitor to Uber. Line launched a new Android app called "Popcorn buzz" in June 2015. The app facilitates group calls with up to 200 members. In June a new Emoji keyboard was also released for IOS devices, which provides a Line-like experience with the possibility to add stickers. In September 2015 a new Android launcher was released on the Google Play Store, helping the company to promote its own services through the new user interface.

=== Official channels ===
Line includes a feature known as "official channels" which allows companies, especially news media outlets, publications and other mass media companies to offer an official channel which users can join and thereby receive regular updates, published articles or news updates from companies or news outlets.

=== Stickers ===
Line features a Sticker Shop where users are able to purchase virtual stickers depicting original and well-known characters. The stickers are used during chat sessions between users and act as large emoji. Users can purchase stickers as gifts, with many stickers available as free downloads, depending on country availability. Purchased stickers are attached to an account and can be used on other platforms. New sticker sets are released weekly. Line's message stickers feature original characters as well as a number of popular manga, anime and gaming characters, movie tie-ins and characters from Disney properties such as Pixar. Some sticker sets, such as those that celebrate special events like the 2012 Summer Olympics, are released for only a limited time. Other sticker sets that support charity are known as Charity Stickers. For example, in 2016, Line released "Support Kumamoto" Charity Stickers to provide aid to victims of the 2016 Kumamoto earthquakes. All proceeds earned from the sales of these stickers were to be donated to the Japanese Red Cross Society to provide financial support and aid for the victims.

The original default characters and stickers, known as Line Friends, were created by Kang Byeongmok, also known as "Mogi", in 2011.

There are over 1 billion stickers sent by worldwide users on a daily basis. The popular characters Milk & Mocha began as stickers on Line in Indonesia.

=== Games ===
NHN Japan created Line Games in 2011. Only those with a Line application account can install and play the games. Players can connect with friends, send and accept items and earn friend points. The game range includes: puzzles, match-three, side-scroller, musical performance, simulation, battle and spot-the-difference games. In September 2013, Line Corporation announced its games had been downloaded 200 million times worldwide.

On July 10, 2017, Line Games acquired NextFloor Corporation, developers of Dragon Flight and Destiny Child. On January 5, 2017, Line Games was announced as the publisher for Hundred Soul (formerly known as Project 100) by Hound 13.

On December 12, 2018, Line Games held a media event called LPG (Line Games-Play-Game) to introduce its games for 2019. Mobile games announced include: Exos Heroes (by OOZOO), Ravenix: The Card Master (also by OOZOO), Dark Summoners (by SkeinGlobe), Project PK (by Rock Square) and Super String (by Factorial Games). Project NM by Space Dive was also announced for PC. Games to be released on mobile and PC include: Project NL (by MeerKat Games) and Uncharted Waters Origins (by Line Games and Koei Tecmo).

On 10 Jul 2019, Nintendo released Dr. Mario World co-developed by Line Games. On July 18, 2019, First Summoner developed by SkeinGlobe was released.

==== List of current games ====
- Line Rangers
- Tsum Tsum
- LINE Brown Farm
- Brown Toys
- LINE Chef
- LINE POP2
- LINE Puzzle TanTan
- LINE Bubble!
- LINE Bubble 2
- LINE Pokopang - puzzle game!

==== List of discontinued games ====
- I Love Coffee
- LINE POP
- LINE Play
- LINE Cookie Run
- Line Fighters
- Line Brown Stories (Asia)

=== Line Pay ===
Line introduced Line Pay worldwide on December 16, 2014. The service allows users to request and send money from users in their contact list and make mobile payments in store. The service has since expanded to allow other features such as offline wire transfers when making purchases and ATM transactions like depositing and withdrawing money. Unlike other Line services, Line Pay is offered worldwide through the Line app.

=== Line Taxi ===
Line Taxi was launched in January 2015 in partnership with Nihon Kotsu, a local taxi service in Japan. Like Line Pay, Line Taxi was not offered as a separate app but rather through the Line app where users can request a taxi and automatically pay for it when they connect their account to Line Pay. Line Taxi was discontinued on 31 August 2018.

=== Line Wow ===
Announced alongside Line Pay and Line Taxi, a service that allows users to instantly access delivery services for registered food or products and services.

=== Line Today ===
A news hub integrated in the Line app.

=== Line Shopping ===
A referral program for online shopping. Customers get extra discount or earn Line Points by purchasing through the Line Shopping service.

=== Line Gift ===
A gift sending services on Line. Customers can send gift via Line.

=== Line Doctor ===
A matching platform for finding doctors online.

== Line Lite ==
Line Lite
- Developer: Line Corporation
- Stable release: 2.17.1 / 2021-09-13
- Operating system: Android
- Size: 8.89 MB
- Website: line.me

In 2015, a lower-overhead Android app was released for emerging markets called Line Lite. This supports messages and calls but not themes or timeline.

It became available worldwide in August 2015.

In January 2022, Line announced the discontinuation of Line Lite, taking effect on the 28th February 2022.

== Limitations ==
Line accounts can be accessed on multiple devices, but one mobile device is required to be a designated "main device". A personal computer can only be a "sub device".

If "Line Lite" for Android was installed and activated, the user was told they will be "logged out of the normal Line". This message did not make clear that it was impossible to log back in to the normal Line, which would delete all history data when next launched. Line Lite has now been discontinued.

== Security ==
In August 2013, it was possible to intercept a Line chat session at the network level using packet capture software and to reconstruct it on a PC. Messages were sent in cleartext to Line's server when on cellular data but encrypted when using Wi-Fi most of the time.

Until February 2016, it was also possible to "clone" an iPhone from a backup and then use the "cloned" iPhone to access the same Line account as used by the original iPhone. This loophole was widely rumored (but never proven) to have been used to intercept Line messages between the popular Japanese television personality Becky and her married romantic partner Enon Kawatani; the intercepted messages were published in the magazine Shukan Bunshun and led to the temporary suspension of Becky's television career.

In July 2016, Line Corporation turned on end-to-end encryption by default for all Line users. It had earlier been available as an opt-in feature since October 2015. The app uses the ECDH protocol for client-to-client encryption. In August 2016, Line expanded its end-to-end encryption to also encompass its group chats, voice calls and video calls.

In March 2021, the Japanese government announced that it would investigate Line after reports that it let Chinese system-maintenance engineers in Shanghai access Japanese users' data without informing them, beginning in August 2018. Four Chinese engineers in a Shanghai-based affiliate that Line subcontracted to develop AI accessed the messages stored in the Japanese computer system and personal information of Line users, such as: name, phone number, email address and Line ID. Photos and video footage posted by Japanese users were also stored on a server in South Korea. Line stated in March 2021 that it had since blocked access to user data at the Chinese affiliate and that it would revise its privacy policy and make it more explicit. Line had been used by the Japanese government and local governments to notify residents about developments in dealing with the coronavirus pandemic. In response to the reports of security issues, the national government and many local governments halted their usage of Line in late March 2021. In April 2021 the government ordered Line to take measures to properly protect customers' information and to report improvement measures within a month. Line also relocated image and other data stored in South Korea to Japan. As of November 2021, the Tokyo metropolitan government offers proof of COVID-19 vaccinations through the Line app, with expansion planned for other prefectures.

On 12 April 2021, Line suffered a large-scale crash in Taiwan.

More than 70,000 Line Pay users in Taiwan have been affected by a leak of transaction information during the period from December 26, 2020, to April 2, 2021.

In October 2023, the company confirmed a data breach where over 440,000 items of personal data were leaked. This included user age groups, genders, and partial service usage history, along with business partner and employee information like email addresses and names. The leak was traced back to unauthorized access through a Naver subcontractor's computer, which shared an authentication system with Line, allowing the breach. In March 2024, the Japanese government ordered Line and Naver to separate their systems because of the data leak.

Japan's Ministry of Internal Affairs and Communications issued administrative guidance to LY Corporation twice on April 16, 2024. LY Corporation is required to submit another report by The Ministry of Internal Affairs and Communications before July 1, 2024.

== Censorship ==
Line suppressed content in China to conform with government censorship. Analysis by Citizen Lab showed that accounts registered with Chinese phone numbers download a list of banned words that cannot be sent or received through Line.

Line publicly confirmed the practice in December 2013. However, by 2014, access to Line chat servers has been entirely blocked by the Great Firewall, while the company still makes revenue in China from brick-and-mortar stores.

In Indonesia, Line has responded to pressure from the Indonesian Communication and Information Ministry to remove emojis and stickers it believes make reference to homosexuality, for example the emoji "two men holding hands". Line issued a public statement on the issue: "Line regrets the incidents of some stickers which are considered sensitive by many people. We ask for your understanding because at the moment we are working on this issue to remove the stickers".

In Thailand, Line is suspected of responding to pressure from the Thai government and, after previously approving "Red Buffalo" stickers, which had been used to refer to the Red Shirts political faction, including by the Red Shirts themselves, removed the stickers.

In Russia, on 28 April 2017, Russia's Federal Service for Supervision of Communications, Information Technology and Mass Media (Roskomnadzor) placed Line on a banned list. Telecommunications companies appear to have taken steps in May to progressively block access to Line and other services using smartphones. The Russian Internet Regulation Law obliges social network operators to store personal information of their Russian customers in the country and submit it if requested by the authorities; Line is believed to have been found to be in breach of this provision. According to reports, BBM, Imo.im and Vchat have been newly added to the list of banned services, in addition to Line. On 3 May 2017 access to Line chat servers was entirely blocked by the Roskomnadzor and the Line servers were added to the Unified Register of Banned Sites, after which Russian users began to experience problems receiving and sending messages.

== Issues ==
=== Similarity and imitation of other services ===
The chief executive officer of Line, Mr. Morikawa, has stated that they referred to services like KakaoTalk and Instagram when developing Line.

A game similar to KakaoTalk's top hit "Anipang" appeared on Line as "Line Pop".

=== Patent infringement ===
The "Furufuru" feature on Line, which allowed users to add friends by shaking their smartphones in the same location and exchanging contact information, was found to infringe on a patent held by a Kyoto-based IT company called "Future Eye". The company filed a lawsuit in the Tokyo District Court, demanding 300 million yen in compensation. The court ruled on May 19, 2021, acknowledging the patent infringement and ordering Line to pay approximately 14 million yen in damages. Line later revealed that it had reached a settlement with Future Eye and expressed its intention to continue respecting intellectual property while improving its services for customers. The "Furufuru" feature was discontinued in May 2020.

=== Personal information protection issues ===
==== Personal information leaks and inadequate countermeasures ====
Since around 2012, as Line gained popularity, there was an increasing concern about the safety of personal information. It was noted that the contents of phonebooks, which contain "other people's personal information", were being uploaded to third parties without their consent.

Since phone numbers are used to identify accounts on Line, there is a risk of misuse when phone numbers, which are used for membership registrations or reservations, are exploited.

There have been concerns about the risks of phone number-linked social graphs being leaked or users' Line registration names being associated with their phone numbers, especially when using the desktop version to register phone numbers randomly.

In April 2013, Line announced that it had received three global assurance reports, confirming the security of its information management. However, there have been several instances of personal information leaks since then. Of the three certifications, one was a simplified version of SOC2 that was used for marketing purposes.

Due to ongoing concerns, Line began recommending the use of the [+Message] service for more secure communication in 2021.

=== Ignoring vulnerabilities ===
The Information-Technology Promotion Agency notified Line about several critical software vulnerabilities, such as the risk of external access to chat history and photos, and the exposure of data stored on SD cards. Despite being notified about multiple vulnerabilities, Line acknowledged only a few and did not take steps to resolve them. The agency repeatedly informed Line until the company finally admitted the issue, which was reported by FACTA Online in 2015.

== Incidents ==
=== Use in sexual crimes and other criminal activities ===
Since around 2012, there has been an increasing trend of incidents such as extortion and compensated dating occurring through Line. However, Line does not have a feature for exchanging contact information with strangers, similar to "dating apps". Most of these incidents happen through external bulletin boards, websites, or apps, where users exchange IDs and then establish contact with each other 90% of girls are sexually victimized via smartphones, with the majority using Line, according to a scattering of sources. It has been observed that 90% of sexual crimes involving minors occur through smartphones, with the majority of cases using Line. Line's terms of service also prohibit using the service for the purpose of meeting strangers for dating.

Services that aim to exchange Line IDs through bulletin boards, unlike dating sites, are not subject to regulations like the Dating Sites Regulation Law or the Harmful Site Regulation Law, and are not filtered by laws aimed at protecting minors. As a result, the police can only respond to requests for action, while Line has taken measures such as issuing warnings about these services and periodically blocking ID search features for users under the age of 18.

Students with immature social skills have used Line to engage in verbal abuse, exclusion, the spreading of bullying images, and other forms of new bullying. Educational institutions and boards are urgently working on countermeasures.

Due to the ongoing misuse of Line for sexual crimes, Kyoto Prefecture and the Kyoto Prefectural Police have requested Line to implement measures promoting proper use, prevent the misuse of "bulletin board apps" that could lead to child pornography or child prostitution, and create systems that make it harder for users to access illegal or harmful content.

=== Use in bullying ===
In 2014, the Ministry of Education, Culture, Sports, Science and Technology (MEXT) reported an increase in bullying cases involving computers and mobile phones. Shuichi Hirai, Director of the Division of Students and Pupils at MEXT, stated, "Bullying through platforms like Line has evolved, and it has become harder for adults to detect these incidents." Cyberbullying, which occurs in private communications between children, makes it difficult for others to observe, and existing countermeasures have not been effective. Line is often used for malicious actions, such as excluding individuals from groups, spreading insults and defamatory statements, and sharing humiliating images. These types of harmful posts are frequently observed during long holidays.

In August 2017, the National Web Counseling Association received a record number of 353 inquiries about Line-related bullying.

=== Line account takeover incidents ===
In June 2014, a series of account takeover incidents occurred where Line accounts were hijacked, and special fraud was committed using these accounts. The fraudsters used leaked passwords to illegally log in and posed as acquaintances to extort web money from victims. Reports also indicated that celebrities had their Line accounts hijacked.

=== Minor involved in illegal access leading to prosecution ===
In the summer of 2019, two minors living in the Kanto region of Japan learned about a vulnerability in Line's image server. They accessed the server illegally using their home computers, leading to their prosecution under the Unauthorized Computer Access Law. The two minors claimed they were "just trying to see if it was true" when questioned.

=== Data viewing and storage issues by the South Korean government and companies ===
==== Alleged data interception by the South Korean government ====
On June 18, 2014, FACTA Online reported that the South Korean government had been intercepting Line's data (free calls and text messages). According to the article, South Korean cybersecurity officials admitted during a meeting with Japan's Cabinet Cybersecurity Center that the National Intelligence Service of South Korea was collecting and analyzing data exchanged on Line. They also claimed that wiretapping, or directly collecting data from communication lines, is not illegal in South Korea due to the absence of laws protecting the "secrecy of communications" in the country.

In response to this report, Lines president at the time, Akira Morikawa, denied the claims in a blog post, stating that there was no such incident. He emphasized that Line's communication data showed no signs of unauthorized access, and argued that Line employs its own encryption format, making it impossible to analyze the data (However, until the issue was exposed, passwords and messages were stored and transmitted in plaintext). In response, FACTA publisher Shigeo Abe countered the following day, stating that the article was based on solid evidence. At that time, the details supporting both sides’ claims had not been fully disclosed, leading to comments from third parties that there was insufficient evidence to make a clear judgment. On March 25, 2021, a curious event occurred when Akira Morikawa’s blog post was deleted, but after it became a topic of discussion on social media and in the media, he re-published the article.

==== Line usage ban by the Taiwan presidential office ====
On September 23, 2014, the Presidential Office of the Republic of China announced that Line would be banned from use on government computers due to security concerns.

==== Storage and viewing of user data on servers of overseas outsourcing companies in South Korea, China, and other countries ====
On March 17, 2021, it was reported that all user image and video data, as well as transaction information from Line Pay, were being stored on servers belonging to Line's parent company, Naver. Access permissions for this data were granted to employees of Line's South Korean subsidiary, Line Plus, for security check purposes. On the morning of March 17, Chief Cabinet Secretary Katsunobu Kato stated at a press conference, "The relevant government agencies will confirm the facts and take appropriate action." Due to the current privacy policy not adequately communicating the situation to users, Line planned to review the policy and gradually transfer data to domestic servers in Japan starting mid-2021.

Line's data centers are located in multiple countries around the world. User data is mainly divided into text messages, images, and videos. Member registration information, chat texts, Line IDs, phone numbers, email addresses, friend relationships, friend lists, location information, address books, Line Profile+ (including names and addresses), voice call histories (without recordings), and Line service payment histories are managed on servers within Japan, handled with internal data governance according to company standards. However, images, videos, Keep, albums, notes, timelines, and Line Pay transaction information are managed on servers in South Korea.

Only "text messages" and "one-on-one calls" are encrypted with Line's self-developed end-to-end encryption protocol, "Letter Sealing". Even if the data is accessed from the database, the contents of "text messages" and "one-on-one calls" cannot be viewed. "Letter Sealing" is enabled by default, but if the recipient disables this feature, it will not function, even if the sender has it enabled. Text messages, images, and videos are encrypted along the communication route and sent to the server, regardless of the "Letter Sealing" setting. The image and video data are distributed across multiple servers for storage. The security team continuously monitors traffic to address any issues. The servers storing images and videos are planned to be gradually transferred to domestic servers in Japan from mid-2021.

Line Digital Technology (Shanghai) Limited, a subsidiary of Line Plus Corporation in Dalian, develops internal tools, AI features, and various functionalities available in the Line app. They also monitor servers, networks, and PC terminals under their jurisdiction for unauthorized access. During software development, the security team checks the source code and conducts security tests to prevent unauthorized programs from being included.

Naver China, a Chinese subsidiary of Naver Corporation that handles Lines outsourcing work, is responsible for monitoring chat texts, Line official accounts, and timeline content for users outside Japan, Taiwan, Thailand, and Indonesia who have been "reported" by other users.

Line's domestic subsidiary, Line Fukuoka, and a major outsourcing company group in China monitor around 18,000 timeline posts and 74,000 open chat messages daily. Texts reported for spam or nuisance behavior in user chats between Japanese users are uploaded in plain text from user devices to servers and are monitored by Line Fukuoka.

Line is used by the Japanese government and local municipalities for providing administrative services and COVID-19 notifications. In response to the reports, the Ministry of Internal Affairs and Communications announced on March 19 that it would temporarily suspend the use of Line services and request local governments to investigate their usage. On March 17, Fukuoka City confirmed with Line Fukuoka that personal information entered by citizens and chat content were not among the data accessible to Chinese contractors, and that the situation was not such that any access was possible. Therefore, the city decided to continue using the service for administrative purposes. On March 25, Hyogo Prefecture confirmed with Line Corporation that no unauthorized access or data leaks had occurred and decided to continue using Line for COVID-19-related services. Osaka City resumed services on Line that do not handle confidential information starting April 1.

On April 9, 2021, Akira Amari, a member of the Liberal Democratic Party of Japan, stated that Line and its parent company Z Holdings had promised to implement measures such as adopting a cybersecurity system based on the U.S. National Institute of Standards and Technology SP800-171 level and limiting data management to countries with information protection rules equivalent to Japan's. The domestic transfer of user information is scheduled to be completed by 2024.

==== Administrative guidance by the Personal Information Protection Commission and the Ministry of Internal Affairs and Communications ====
Starting on March 31, 2021, the Personal Information Protection Commission conducted an on-site inspection of Line under Article 40, Section 1 of the Personal Information Protection Act. On April 23, the Commission issued administrative guidance regarding the issue where Chinese contractors were able to access Line's personal information management servers. Additionally, starting March 26, the Ministry of Internal Affairs and Communications (MIC) provided written guidance to Line about safety management measures for its internal systems and appropriate explanations to users.

On March 28, 2024, the Personal Information Protection Commission issued administrative guidance (recommendation) to Line Yahoo in response to a data breach involving 520,000 personal data records. On April 1, 2024, Line Yahoo reported that it would gradually separate its systems from Naver, with full separation scheduled for December 2026. On April 16, 2024, the Ministry of Internal Affairs and Communications conducted a rare second round of administrative guidance to Line Yahoo, criticizing insufficient measures to protect communication privacy and cybersecurity. They requested a review of the relationship with Naver.

==== Final report on economic security issues ====
On October 18, 2021, a special committee formed by Z Holdings, the parent company of Line, released its final report. It criticized the fact that Chinese affiliates had access to personal information stored on Korean servers, stating that economic security concerns were not adequately considered and that the system lacked a proper review framework. The report noted that the Chinese government, under the National Intelligence Law enacted in 2017, could compel private companies to provide information, strengthening government control over data. The committee highlighted the insufficient measures taken by Line to handle government access to data (government surveillance).

The report concluded that Line had misrepresented the situation by claiming that user data was stored exclusively in Japan, even though it was actually stored on servers in South Korea. The committee argued that this was due to Line's desire to maintain the image of the Line app as a domestic service and avoid openly acknowledging its ties to South Korea. Although Line's actions did not violate domestic law, the handling of personal data had caused a loss of trust. In response, Line issued a statement on October 18, acknowledging that its governance and risk management systems had not kept pace with its rapid growth. To prevent future incidents, the special committee recommended that Z Holdings establish an expert committee to consult third-party opinions and introduce a highly independent Data Protection Officer at major business units.

== Other incidents ==
=== Alleged violation of laws by Line games ===
It was reported by Mainichi Shimbun that the Ministry of Finance and the Kanto Local Finance Bureau conducted an on-site inspection of Line's mobile game "Line Pop" due to suspected violations of the Funds Settlement Act regarding paid in-game items. In response to the report, Line issued a statement titled "Our Opinion Regarding Some of the Reported Content", immediately denying part of the allegations.

Line Games Temporarily Suspended from App Store for Violating App Store Guidelines. The Line Quick Game was temporarily removed from the Apple App Store after violations of the App Store's regulations, which included issues with the games "Line で発見!! たまごっち", "探検ドリランド ブレイブハンターズ", and "釣り★スタ Quick". A total of 8 titles were taken down for one month due to these violations.

=== Abuse by doctors in Line Healthcare ===
On August 3, 2020, it was reported that a doctor registered in Line Healthcare, a paid service, had verbally abused a user, violating the service's terms of use. Line Healthcare issued an apology and announced measures to prevent recurrence on August 20, 2020.

=== Personal information leakage from Line Game refund applications ===
From April 12, 2018, to September 20, 2020, personal information entered into the refund application form for Line Game service terminations was exposed and accessible through the Internet Archive. The exposed information included bank account details, email addresses, and Line app identifiers of 18 individuals. After the issue was discovered, the archive was deleted.

=== Data breach in Line Creators Market ===
From April 17, 2014, the launch of Line Creators Market until October 31, 2020, files containing potentially sensitive personal information uploaded by Line Creators Market vendors were publicly accessible. The data, which was included in Internet Archive's collection, was available to the public. After the issue was identified, access to the files was blocked, and the data from the archive was deleted.

=== Fake posts on Line Open Chat ===
Shukan Bunshun reported that employees of Line were posting fake messages (known as "Sakura posts") on its new service, Open Chat, impersonating ordinary users like high school girls or trendy women. The "Sakura posts" were not done solely by staff, but followed a manual called "Talk-room Operation" created by the head office. Line explained that these posts were made to improve the overall quality and user satisfaction of Open Chat and to create good quality chat rooms. They also stated that staff involvement in managing some chat rooms was intended to protect minor users. However, Shukan Bunshun reported that, according to insiders, these posts were aimed at creating a positive image to facilitate future monetization. Line avoided directly commenting on the article but acknowledged the problem, stating that it was an issue for users, as they were not informed that posts came from employees or that they were posting under false identities. The company updated the manual on April 12 and provided explanations to users on April 15.

=== Incorrect Message Display in Reporting Function ===
Between 2017 and 2021, during program updates to the LINE app, a bug caused incorrect messaging to be displayed in the report function. The erroneous message stated that by reporting a user, it would send "the reported user's information, including the latest 10 messages" when, in fact, it only intended to send "the reported user's information." This bug occurred on iOS from December 4, 2017, to March 30, 2021, on Android from August 20, 2018, to March 28, 2021, and on Desktop from March 4, 2021, to March 30, 2021. After confirming the error in late March 2021, the issue was fixed. The reported content was not used for commercial purposes like advertising but was intended solely for public benefit to protect users from harmful content.

== Related products ==
=== Line Friends ===
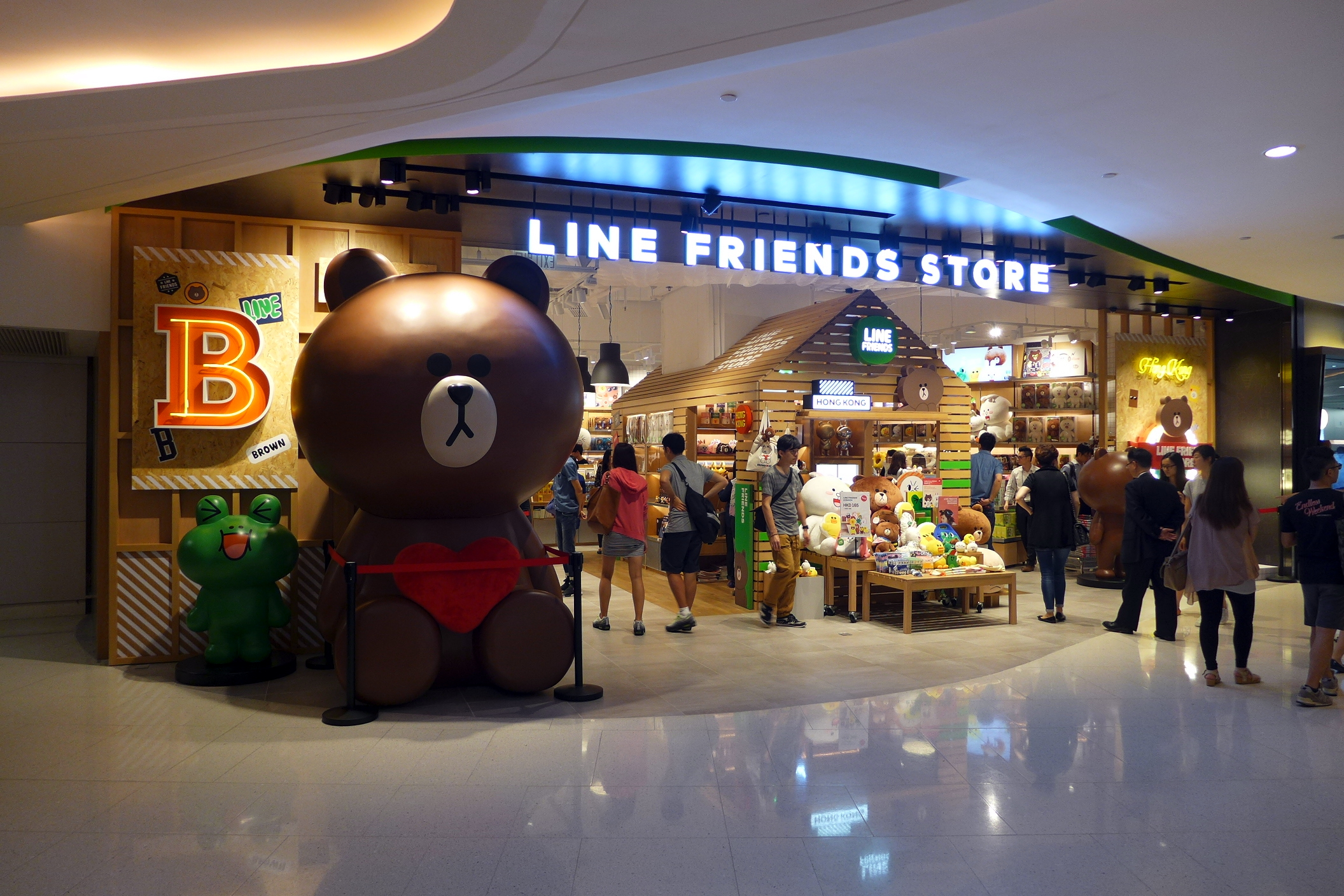
Line Friends Store in Hysan Place, Hong Kong

Line Friends are featured characters that are shown in stickers of the application. They include Brown, Cony, Sally, James, Moon, Boss, Jessica, Edward, Leonard, Choco, Pangyo and Rangers. Two anime series, Line Offline and Line Town, were produced in 2013, picturing the Line Friends as employees for the fictional Line Corporation.

=== Line Man ===
Lineman (LINEMAN) is a multiple-services mobile application in Thailand. Application's services are including: food delivery, grocery delivery, personal courier and passenger riding service for both motorcycle and passenger vehicles. Lineman application is now available for customers in various Thailand's major areas nationwide. Customer required the LINE application to be installed on their phone and login with their own LINE account to be able to download and using Lineman application.

Lineman was started in 2016 with the collaboration between LINE Thailand and Wongnai, Thailand's restaurant review, recommendation and point of sale services company for introducing as one of Thailand's first online food order and delivery service application with Wongnai's affiliated restaurants in Bangkok before expanding their services and service areas overtime since.

=== Line TV ===
A video on demand service operating in Taiwan and Thailand.

=== Stores ===
There are physical stores in Japan, South Korea, China, Taiwan, Hong Kong, Philippines, Thailand, U.S. and a Korean online store to purchase Line Friends merchandise. Occasionally, Line will have pop-up or temporary stores globally.

== See also ==
- Comparison of cross-platform instant messaging clients
- Comparison of instant messaging protocols
- Comparison of Internet Relay Chat clients
- Comparison of LAN messengers
- Comparison of VoIP software
- List of SIP software
- List of video telecommunication services and product brands
