= Mailslot =

Mailslot is a one-way interprocess communication mechanism, available on the Microsoft Windows operating system that allows communication between processes locally. Mailslots also supported communication over a network. The use of Mailslots is generally simpler than named pipes or sockets when a relatively small number of relatively short messages is expected to be transmitted, such as for example infrequent state-change messages, or as part of a peer-discovery protocol. Up until Windows 11 24H2, the Mailslot mechanism also allowed for short message broadcasts ("datagrams") to all listening computers across a given network domain. The mechanism originated in LAN Manager, a component of OS/2, an operating system co-developed by IBM and Microsoft. Mailslots were discontinued in Windows 11 24H2.

== Features ==
Mailslots function as a server-client interface. A server can create a Mailslot, and a client could write to it by name. Only the server can read the mailslot, as such mailslots represented a one-way communication mechanism. A server-client interface could consist of two processes communicating locally or across a network. Mailslots operated over the RPC protocol and worked across all computers in the same network domain. Mailslots offered no confirmation that a message had been received. Mailslots were generally a good choice when one client process need to broadcast a message to multiple server processes.

== Uses ==
The most widely known use of the Mailslot IPC mechanism was the Windows Messenger service that was part of the Windows NT-line of products, including Windows XP. The Messenger Service, not to be confused with the MSN Messenger internet chat service, was essentially a Mailslot server that waited for a message to arrive. When a message arrived, it was displayed in a popup onscreen. The NET SEND command was therefore a type of Mailslot client, because it wrote to specified mailslots on a network.

A number of programs also used Mailslots to communicate. Generally these were amateur chat clients and other such programs. Commercial programs usually preferred pipes or sockets.

Mailslots were implemented as files in a mailslot file system (MSFS). Examples of Mailslots included:

- MAILSLOT\Messngr - Microsoft NET SEND Protocol
- MAILSLOT\Browse - Microsoft Browser Protocol
- MAILSLOT\Alerter
- MAILSLOT\53cb31a0\UnimodemNotifyTSP
- MAILSLOT\HydraLsServer - Microsoft Terminal Services Licensing
- MAILSLOT\CheyenneDS - CA BrightStor Discovery Service
