= Milk & Mocha =

Cartoon characters

Milk & Mocha Bear
- Milk on left and Mocha on right
- Author: Melani Sie
- Launch date: 2016

Milk & Mocha are two bear characters popular on many forms of social media. The brand was created by Melani Sie, an Indonesian artist, in 2016. The characters started as stickers on the LINE messaging app and have since expanded to many platforms and are popular in many countries.

== Background ==
Sie created Milk & Mocha in 2016 as stickers to be used by Indonesian users on the LINE messaging app. LINE started in Japan and has become very popular in Indonesia and other southeast Asian countries. Stickers are popular on the app as a form of detailed and large emoji, and can be purchased by users. Originally a user-submitted series of stickers, LINE made them an official part of the Indonesian platform in 2018. Due to its popularity in Indonesia, Milk & Mocha stickers began to be released in other Asian countries including Thailand and Taiwan in 2019, and went from being only static graphics to also being animated.

By 2020, the characters had also become popular in the United States and India.

As its popularity grew, merchandise also began to be offered, as well as a weekly comic strip. Sie joined with another creator to create Klova Studios as the corporate head of the franchise in 2018.

== Characters ==
Milk is a white bear and Mocha is a brown bear. They have a small green pet dinosaur named Matcha. In 2024, a yellow frog named Mustard started to appear in the comic strips as a pet adopted by Mocha.

Sie first conceived of the pair as a panda and a polar bear before redesigning them, but the concept was generally inspired by other "cute" characters, and their personalities were not developed at first. She models their interactions on common situations that couples encounter. Milk is usually cheerful and energetic, while Mocha is calm and sometimes gloomy. Often Milk engages Mocha by encouraging Mocha to join in an activity.
