= Microsoft Notification Protocol =

Instant messaging protocol by Microsoft

Microsoft Notification Protocol (MSNP, also known as the Mobile Status Notification Protocol) is an instant messaging protocol developed by Microsoft for use by the Microsoft Messenger service and the instant messaging clients that connect to it, such as Skype (from 2014 to 2019), and the earlier Windows Live Messenger, MSN Messenger, Windows Messenger, and Microsoft Messenger for Mac. Third-party clients such as Pidgin and Trillian also communicated using the protocol. MSNP was first used in a publicly available product with the first release of MSN Messenger in 1999.

== Technical details ==
Any major change made to the protocol, such as a new command or syntax changes, results in a version-number incremented by one in the format of MSNP#. During October 2003, Microsoft started blocking access to Messenger service using versions below MSNP8.

On September 11, 2007, Microsoft forced most users of MSN Messenger to upgrade to Windows Live Messenger 8.1 due to security considerations.

== Security concerns ==
A 2007 analysis of the Microsoft Notification Protocol, which was unencrypted in its early iterations, concluded that its design "did not follow several principles of designing secure systems", resulting in a "plethora of security vulnerabilities"; these vulnerabilities were demonstrated by successfully spoofing a user's identity.

== Version history ==
- MSNP1: Internal/development version used during early stages of MSN Messenger 1.
- MSNP2: Pre-release version made available to developers in 1999 via an Internet Draft, though the production release differed slightly.
- MSNP3: Supported by MSN Messenger 2.0 and WebTV (MSN TV) Messenger. Introduced the IMS command to manage switchboard sessions.
- MSNP4 & MSNP5: Implemented in July 2000 and used by MSN Messenger 3.0 and 4.0.
- MSNP6 & MSNP7: MSNP6 was used by later releases of MSN Messenger 4.x; MSNP7 was introduced in 2002 with MSN Messenger 5.0.
- MSNP8: Introduced authentication via Microsoft Passport servers and challenge strings. Became the minimum required version for .NET Messenger Service. Supported webcam and voice features between Windows Messenger clients.
- MSNP9: Added support for "D type" (data) messages for avatar and custom emoticon transfers, frame-by-frame webcam feeds, and improved NAT traversal.
- MSNP10: Used in MSN Messenger 6.1 with Hotmail address book integration.
- MSNP11 & MSNP12: Used in MSN Messenger 7.0 and 7.5, respectively.
- MSNP13: Introduced in Windows Live Messenger 8.0. Replaced server-side contact list sync with SOAP requests to the Address Book Clearing House (ABCH).
- MSNP14: Added interoperability with Yahoo! Messenger.
- MSNP15: Introduced in Windows Live Messenger 8.1 (2006). Transitioned to Single Sign-On (SSO / Relying Party Suite) authentication instead of Tweener (TWN).
- MSNP16: Used in pre-release versions of Windows Live Messenger 9.0 (2007). Added Multiple Points of Presence (MPOP) support.
- MSNP17: Identified on servers but never used in official public releases.
- MSNP18: Introduced in Windows Live Messenger 2009 (14.0), adding persistent conversation groups.
- MSNP21: Employed by Windows Live Messenger 2011 (Wave 4) and 2012.
- MSNP24: Employed by Skype from early 2014 until April 2019, when it was fully retired.

== See also ==
- Microsoft Messenger service
- Apple Push Notification Service
- iMessage
- Comparison of instant messaging protocols
