= Microsoft Messenger service =

Instant messaging service

Messenger (formerly MSN Messenger Service, .NET Messenger Service and Windows Live Messenger Service) was an instant messaging and presence system developed by Microsoft in 1999 for use with its MSN Messenger software. It was used by instant messaging clients including Windows 8, Windows Live Messenger, Microsoft Messenger for Mac, Outlook.com and Xbox Live. Third-party clients also connected to the service. It communicated using the Microsoft Notification Protocol, a proprietary instant messaging protocol. The service allowed anyone with a Microsoft account to sign in and communicate in real time with other people who were signed in as well.

On January 11, 2013, Microsoft announced that they were retiring the existing Messenger service globally (except for mainland China where Messenger will continue to be available) and replacing it with Skype. In April 2013, Microsoft merged the service into Skype; existing users were able to sign into Skype with their existing accounts and access their contact list. As part of the merger, Skype's instant messaging functionality is now running on the backbone of the former Messenger service.

== Background ==
Despite multiple name changes to the service and its client software over the years, the Messenger service is often referred to colloquially as "MSN", due to the history of MSN Messenger. The service itself was known as MSN Messenger Service from 1999 to 2001, at which time, Microsoft changed its name to .NET Messenger Service and began offering clients that no longer carried the "MSN" name, such as the Windows Messenger client included with Windows XP, which was originally intended to be a streamlined version of MSN Messenger, free of advertisements and integrated into Windows.

Nevertheless, the company continued to offer more upgrades to MSN Messenger until the end of 2005, when all previous versions of MSN Messenger and Windows Messenger were superseded by a new program, Windows Live Messenger, as part of Microsoft's launch of its Windows Live online services.

For several years, the official name for the service remained .NET Messenger Service, as indicated on its official network status web page, though Microsoft rarely used the name to promote the service. Because the main client used to access the service became known as Windows Live Messenger, Microsoft started referring to the entire service as the Windows Live Messenger Service in its support documentation in the mid-2000s.

The service can integrate with the Windows operating system, automatically and simultaneously signing into the network as the user logs into their Windows account. Organizations can also integrate their Microsoft Office Communications Server and Active Directory with the service. In December 2011, Microsoft released an XMPP interface to the Messenger service.

As part of a larger effort to rebrand many of its Windows Live services, Microsoft began referring to the service as simply Messenger in 2012.

== Software ==
=== Official clients ===
Microsoft offered the following instant messaging clients that connected to the Messenger service:

- Windows Live Messenger, for users of Windows 7 and previous versions
  - MSN Messenger was the former name of the client from 1999 to 2006
  - Windows Messenger is a scaled-down client that was included with Windows XP in 2001
- Microsoft Messenger for Mac, for users of Mac OS X
- Outlook.com includes web browser-based functionality for instant messaging
  - Hotmail, the predecessor to Outlook.com, includes similar functionality for Messenger
  - Windows Live Web Messenger was a web-based program for use through Internet Explorer
  - MSN Web Messenger was the former name of the web-based client
- Windows 8, includes a built-in Messaging client
- Xbox Live includes access to the Messenger service from within the Xbox Dashboard
- MSN TV (formerly WebTV) had a built-in messaging client available on the original WebTV/MSN TV and MSN TV 2 devices, which was originally introduced via a Summer 2000 software update
- Messenger on Windows Phone includes access to the Messenger service from within a phone running Windows Phone
- Windows Live Messenger for iPhone and iPod Touch includes access to the Messenger service from within an iPhone, iPod Touch or iPad
- Windows Live Messenger for Nokia includes access to the Messenger service from within a Nokia phone
- Messenger Play! includes access to the Messenger service from within an Android phone or tablet
- Windows Live Messenger for BlackBerry includes access to the Messenger service from within a BlackBerry

== Security concerns ==
A 2007 analysis of Messenger's Microsoft Notification Protocol, which is unencrypted, concluded that its design "did not follow several principles of designing secure systems", resulting in a "plethora of security vulnerabilities"; these vulnerabilities were demonstrated by successfully spoofing a user's identity.

== See also ==
- Microsoft Notification Protocol
- Comparison of instant messaging protocols
- Comparison of cross-platform instant messaging clients
