= Bitmessage =

Peer-to-peer encrypted communication protocol

PyBitmessage
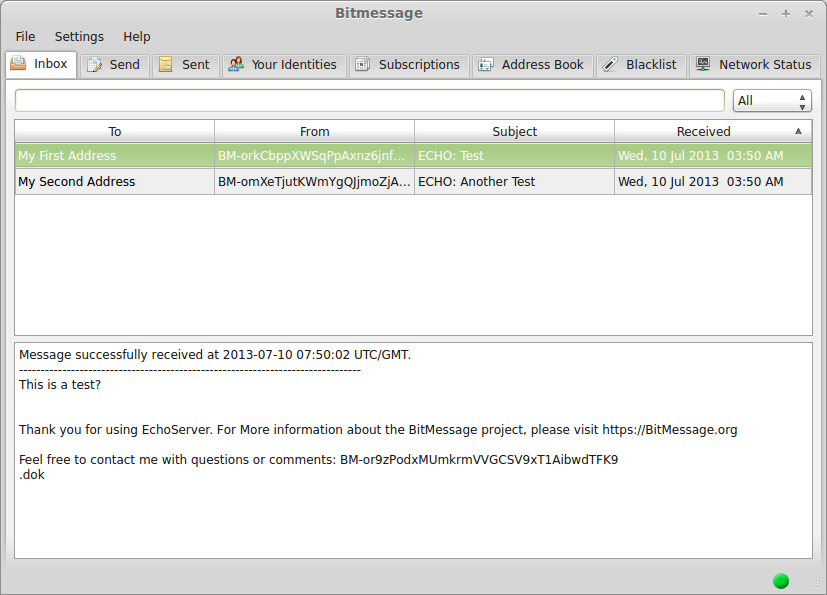
- PyBitmessage version 0.3.5
- Original author: Jonathan Warren
- Developer: Bitmessage Community
- Release: November 2012; 14 years ago
- Stable release: 0.6.3.2 / February 13, 2018; 8 years ago
- Written in: Python, C++ (POW function)
- Operating system: Windows, macOS, Linux, FreeBSD
- Available in: English, Esperanto, French, German, Spanish, Russian, Norwegian, Arabic, Chinese
- Type: Instant messaging client
- License: MIT
- Website: bitmessage.org
- Repository: github.com/Bitmessage/PyBitmessage

Bitmessage is a decentralized, encrypted, peer-to-peer, trustless communications protocol that can be used by one person to send encrypted messages to another person, or to multiple subscribers.

Bitmessage was conceived by software developer Jonathan Warren, who based its design on the decentralized digital currency, Bitcoin. The software was released in November 2012 under the MIT license.

Bitmessage gained a reputation for being out of reach of warrantless wiretapping conducted by the National Security Agency (NSA), due to the decentralized nature of the protocol, and its encryption being difficult to crack. This prevents the accidental eavesdropping. As a result, downloads of the Bitmessage program increased fivefold during June 2013, after news broke of classified email surveillance activities conducted by the NSA.

It achieves anonymity and privacy by relying on the blockchain flooding propagation mechanism and asymmetric encryption algorithm.

Bitmessage has also been mentioned as an experimental alternative to email by Popular Science and CNET.

Some ransomware programs instruct affected users to use Bitmessage to communicate with the attackers.

PyBitmessage version 0.6.2 (March 1, 2017) had a remote code execution vulnerability. It was fixed in version 0.6.3 (February 13, 2018).
