= Stoat (software) =

Online communication software

- Logo used since 2026
- Other names: Revolt
- Developer: Revolt Platforms Ltd
- Release: 27 January 2021; 5 years ago
- Engine: Desktop clients: Electron; Android client: Jetpack Compose; Server: Bespoke, purpose-built
- Operating system: Windows, macOS, Android, Linux, web browsers
- Type: VoIP communications, instant messaging, Videotelephony, and content delivery
- License: GNU Affero General Public License version 3
- Website: stoat.chat

Stoat (formerly Revolt) is a free and open-source, user-first communication platform and instant messaging service. Designed as an alternative to proprietary services like Discord, Stoat allows users to communicate through text, voice, video, and media within organised communities called "servers". The platform is notable for its emphasis on privacy, its use of the Rust programming language for its back-end, and its support for self-hosting. Stoat is available on Windows, Linux, macOS, and Android, with an iOS app currently in development.

== History ==
The platform went live for the first time on January 27, 2021, and opened for public beta on August 11 of the same year. On September 6, 2021, the platform had its first major influx of users after reaching the front page of Hacker News.

On June 13, 2023, the platform announced it had reached 100,000 registered users following a surge in users spurred by the release of an updated username system.

In October 2024, the platform experienced a significant surge in users, reaching over 500,000 registered accounts following regional bans on Discord in countries such as Turkey and Russia.

In early 2025 an Android app launched on Google Play. On October 1^{st}, the development team announced a rebranding from Revolt to Stoat. This change was necessitated by a cease-and-desist letter regarding the "Revolt" trademark. The rebranding was accompanied by the release of a new client for web and desktop, the launch of a new voice chat system, and the migration of all official repositories to the "stoatchat" organisation on GitHub.

Stoat saw another popularity surge in early 2026 following an announcement from Discord that they would be implementing Teen-By-Default age verification globally. Stoat received widespread media attention, it however struggled to handle the increased traffic.

In mid-2026 Stoat launched a GIF sharing and hosting service titled 'Gifbox', developed to address the shutdown of Tenor (website)'s API. Stoat also launched support for video chat and screen sharing on the main instance, however the functionality was already present in the code and availiable to self-hosted instances.

== Controversies ==
In late 2022, the lead developer of Stoat reported that a platform, known as The Real World, operated by internet personality Andrew Tate, was using a modified version of the Revolt back-end and web app. The developers alleged that this was a violation of the AGPLv3 license, as the source code for the modifications was not made public despite the platform generating significant revenue. In November 2024, the platform using the modified software suffered a major data breach, exposing the records of approximately 800,000 users.
