= Swizzor =

Swizzor is a trojan horse. This Trojan program is a Windows PE EXE file, 62 KB in size.

It has numerous aliases such as:

- Downloader.Swizzor (AVG)
- Trojan-Downloader.Win32.Swizzor.cc (Kaspersky Lab)
- Trojan.Swizzor (Doctor Web),
- Troj/Swizzor-CC (Sophos),
- TROJ_SWIZZOR.CC (Trend Micro),
- Trojan.Downloader.Swizzor.CC (SOFTWIN),
- Suspect File (Panda),
- Win32/TrojanDownloader.Swizzor.CC (Eset)
- TR/Dldr.Swizzor.Gen (Avira)

The Trojan works by downloading and launching files from the Internet on the infected machine. The trojan is rated as a medium risk.
