= Wink (animated file) =

Extension for animated file

Winks are Flash-based animated files that appear in Windows Live Messenger. When a user sends a Wink to a friend, the animation file is transferred over the Internet and is displayed on the recipient's computer screen. Microsoft provides some Winks for free with Windows Live Messenger and also links to third party websites where other Winks can be purchased.
