= LAN messenger =

Local instant messaging program

A LAN Messenger is an instant messaging program for computers designed for use within a single local area network (LAN).

Many LAN Messengers offer basic functionality for sending private messages, file transfer, chatrooms and graphical smileys. The advantage of using a simple LAN messenger over a normal instant messenger is that no active Internet connection or central server is required, and only people inside the firewall will have access to the system.

== History ==
A precursor of LAN Messengers is the Unix talk command, and similar facilities on earlier systems, which enabled multiple users on one host system to directly talk with each other. At the time, computers were usually shared between multiple users, who accessed them through serial or telephone lines.

Novell NetWare featured a trivial person-to-person chat program for DOS, which used the [IPX/SPX] protocol suite. NetWare for Windows also included broadcast and targeted messages similar to WinPopup and the Windows Messenger service.

On Windows, WinPopup was a small utility included with Windows 3.11. WinPopup uses SMB/NetBIOS protocol and was intended to receive and send short text messages.

Windows NT/2000/XP improves upon this with Windows Messenger service, a Windows service compatible to WinPopup. On systems where this service is running, the received messages "pop up" as simple message boxes. Any software compatible with WinPopup, like the console utility NET SEND, can send such messages. However, due to security concerns, by default, the messenger service is off in Windows XP SP2 and blocked by Windows XP's firewall.

On Apple's Mac OS X-based computers, the iChat program has allowed LAN messaging over the Bonjour protocol since 2005. The multi-protocol messenger Pidgin has support for the Bonjour protocol, including on Windows.

== See also ==
- Comparison of instant messaging protocols
- Comparison of cross-platform instant messaging clients
- Comparison of LAN messengers
- Friend-to-friend
- IRC on LANs
- Talker
- Windows Messenger service
