= Comparison of LAN messengers =

The following tables compare general and technical information for a number of notable LAN messengers.

== General information ==
Basic general information about the LAN messengers: creator/company, license/price, among others.

	Protocol	Author, creator	First public release date	Latest stable version	Cost (USD)	Software license	Programming language
BeeBEEP	BeeBEEP Protocol	Marco Mastroddi	2010	5.8.6 (February 13, 2023; 3 years ago)	No cost	GPL-3.0-or-later	C++ and Qt
BORGChat	?	Ionut Cioflan	2002	v1.0.0 b438 (March 31, 2007; 19 years ago) [±]	No cost	Proprietary	?
Briar	Bramble Protocol	Briarproject.org	2018	1.4.19 (January 4, 2023; 3 years ago)	No cost	GPL-3.0-or-later	Java
iChat	Bonjour IM Protocol	Apple Inc.	2002	6.0.1 (1002) (February 1, 2012; 14 years ago)	bundled with OS	Proprietary	Likely Objective-C
iptux	Windows Messenger service	Jally, ManPT, others	2008	0.51 (November 20, 2009; 16 years ago)	No cost	GPL-2.0-or-later	?
Miranda NG	Windows Messenger service	Roland Rabien	2000	0.96.1 (June 2, 2022; 4 years ago)	No cost	GPL-2.0-or-later	C/C++
Pidgin	Bonjour IM Protocol	Mark Spencer, others	1998	2.14.12 (December 31, 2022; 3 years ago)	No cost	GPL-2.0-or-later	C
qTox	Tox Protocol	Tux3	?	1.17.6 (March 7, 2022; 4 years ago)	No cost	GPL-3.0-or-later	C++ and Qt

== Operating system support ==
The operating systems the messengers can run on without emulators or compatibility layers.

Client	Windows	Mac OS	Linux	Android	iOS	BSD	Other
BeeBEEP	Yes	Yes	Yes	No	No	Yes	Raspberry OS
BORGChat	Yes	No	No	No	No	No	
Briar	No	No	No	Yes	No	No	
iChat	No	Yes	No	No	No	No	
iptux							
Miranda NG	Yes	No	No	No	No	No	
Pidgin	Yes	Yes	Yes			FreeBSD; NetBSD; OpenBSD	Solaris Illumos
qTox	Yes	Yes	Yes	No	No	FreeBSD	

== Features ==
Information on what features each of the clients support
	Toolkits or SDKs	Private messages	Private chat	Public chat	Message board	Encryption	File transfer	Unicode (UTF-8)	Message filtration	Graphical smileys	Message logging	Whiteboard	Terminal Service Compatibility	User base in Active Directory	Serverless (No server required)
BeeBEEP	No	Yes	Yes	Yes	Yes	Yes	Yes	Yes	Yes	Yes	Yes	No	Yes	Yes	Yes
BORGChat	No	Yes	Yes	Yes	Yes	No	Yes	No	Yes	Yes	Yes	No	No	No	Yes
Briar	No	Yes	Yes	Yes	Yes	Yes	No	Yes	No	Yes	Yes	No	No	No	Yes
iChat ^{1}	No	Yes	Yes	Yes	No	No	Yes	No	No	No	No	No	No	No	No
iptux	No	Yes	Yes	No	No	No	Yes	Yes	No	No	No	No	No	No	Yes
Miranda NG	?	Yes	?	?	?	?	Yes	Yes	?	Yes	Yes	?	?	?	Yes
qTox	No	Yes	Yes	Yes	Yes	Yes	Yes	Yes	No	Yes	Yes	No	No	No	Yes

Note 1: Using Apple's Bonjour protocol

== See also ==
- Comparison of cross-platform instant messaging clients
- Comparison of instant messaging protocols
- Comparison of IRC clients
- LAN messenger
- Windows Messenger service
