= Windows Messenger =

Instant messaging client

- A conversation in Windows Messenger 4.7.2009, with sidebar and toolbar enabled
- Developer: Microsoft
- Initial release: October 22, 2001; 24 years ago
- Stable release: 5.1.0715 / August 12, 2008; 17 years ago
- Operating system: Microsoft Windows
- Successor: Windows Live Messenger
- Website: microsoft.com/windows/messenger (archived pages link August 2003)

Windows Messenger is a discontinued instant messaging client included in Windows XP. Designed for use by both corporate and home users, it was originally created, in 2001, as a streamlined and integrated version of MSN Messenger. It was upgraded several times when it was made available for Windows 2000 and Windows Server 2003. Since then, its development stopped. It was superseded by Windows Live Messenger and Microsoft Lync.

== Overview ==
Windows Messenger was introduced in Windows XP on October 22, 2001. It is enabled by default. Its features include instant messaging, presence awareness, support for Session Initiation Protocol (SIP), file transfer, application sharing and whiteboarding. Later versions added "ink" support and integration with Microsoft Lync Server (formerly Microsoft Office Communications Server). Windows Messenger's user interface is devoid of the clutter seen in Windows Live Messenger. Winks, nudges, and custom emoticons are unavailable, and the main user interface more closely resembles the standard Windows XP Luna style.

Windows Messenger integrates with Microsoft Exchange Server, Microsoft Outlook, Outlook Express, Remote Assistance and Windows Media Center in Windows XP. Windows Messenger can communicate with the Exchange Server 2000's Instant Messaging Service and Microsoft Messenger Service. Interoperability with third-party software is exposed through a COM API called the Real Time Communications (RTC) Client API.

Development of Windows Messenger was halted after version 5.1 in favor of Windows Live Messenger and Microsoft Lync.

== See also ==
- Comparison of cross-platform instant messaging clients
- Comparison of instant messaging protocols
