= MSN Messenger =

Instant messaging client

- MSN Messenger logo, 1999–2006

- MSN Messenger 4.6, released in 2001
- Other names: MSN Messenger Service; Windows Live Messenger
- Developer: Microsoft
- Release: July 22, 1999; 27 years ago
- Final release: 16.4.3508.205 (August 7, 2012; 14 years ago) [±]
- Written in: C++
- Operating system: Windows 98 to 8; Mac OS X; Windows Mobile; Windows Phone; Symbian OS 9.x; BlackBerry OS; iOS; Windows CE; Xbox 360; MSN TV
- Successor: Skype
- Available in: 50 languages
- Type: Instant messaging
- License: Proprietary (freeware or bundled)
- Website: messenger.live.com

MSN Messenger (also known colloquially simply as MSN), later rebranded as Windows Live Messenger, is a retired cross-platform instant-messaging client developed by Microsoft. It connected to the now-discontinued Microsoft Messenger service and, in later versions, was compatible with Yahoo Messenger and Facebook Messenger. The service was discontinued in 2013 in favor of Skype, which was later replaced with Microsoft Teams.

The client was first released as MSN Messenger Service on July 22, 1999, and was marketed under the MSN brand until 2005, when it was rebranded under the Windows Live name. It has since been officially known by the latter name, although its first name remained in common use. In June 2009, Microsoft reported the service attracted over 330 million active users each month, placing it among the most widely used instant-messaging clients in the world.

Following its acquisition of Skype Technologies in May 2011, Microsoft added interoperability between Skype and Microsoft accounts, allowing Skype—which had features unique to its platform and a wider user base—to communicate with Windows Live Messenger contacts. In 2013, under the leadership of CEO Steve Ballmer, the product was discontinued, and Microsoft began cutting service to existing clients. It remained active in China for another 18 months and ceased operations there on October 31, 2014.

In 2018, a free version of Microsoft Teams became available after years as a component of an Office 365 subscription. Teams inherited the Microsoft accounts architecture, allowing users to invite contacts from the discontinued services, MSN Messenger and Skype.

== History ==
=== MSN Messenger 1.0–7.5 (1999–2005) ===
MSN Messenger 1.0

Before the product was renamed Windows Live Messenger, it was named "MSN Messenger" from 1999 to 2006. During that time, Microsoft released seven major versions as follows. The first version of MSN Messenger Service, version 1.0 (1.0.0863), was released July 22, 1999. It included only basic features, such as plain text messaging and a simplistic contact list. When it was first released, it featured support for access to America Online's AIM network. America Online continually tried to block Microsoft from having access to their service until eventually the feature was removed, and it has not re-surfaced in any later versions of the software. AOL did this by exploiting a buffer overflow bug in AIM, which causes it to execute a bit of machine code sent by the server. When this code runs, it determines if the client is AIM and sends a message back to verify the client. Since then, the software has only allowed connections to its own service, requiring a Windows Live ID (.NET Passport at that time) account to connect. Microsoft released the first major update, version 2.0 (2.0.0083), on November 16, 1999. It included a rotating advertising banner and the ability to customize the appearance of the chat window. It came as an install option for Windows Me. This version was followed the next year by version 3.0 (3.0.0080), which was released May 29, 2000. It included file transfers and PC-to-PC and PC-to-phone audio capabilities with Net2Phone and Callserve, two of the larger VoIP providers.

Along with the release of Windows XP came version 4.6 of MSN Messenger, on October 23, 2001. It included major changes to the user interface, the ability to group contacts, and support for voice conversations. In this version, the client software was renamed from "MSN Messenger Service" to just "MSN Messenger", while the underlying service became known as ".NetWork Messenger Service". This version was only compatible with Windows 95, 98, ME, NT 4.0, and 2000, because Microsoft provided a scaled-down new program for Windows XP, called Windows Messenger. Version 5.0 of MSN Messenger was released on October 24, 2002. It was the first version that was allowed to be installed along with Windows Messenger on Windows XP. It included UPnP (Universal Plug and Play) based file transfers, minor changes to the user interface artwork, and a Windows Media Player interface plug-in.

Version 6.0 of MSN Messenger was released July 17, 2003. MSN Messenger 6.0 was a major overhaul of the whole platform, upgrading its simple text-based interface to include customizable elements such as emoticons, personalized avatars, and backgrounds. An update, version 6.1, focused on improvements to the conversation window, enabling users to hide the window frame and menu bar, and also the ability to change the theme color. The theme color could be set differently for each user. Another update, version 6.2, was released April 22, 2004, and it was the last version of the MSN Messenger 6 series. The most notable changes were a dedicated Mobile group for mobile contacts, a connection troubleshooter, and the Launch Site feature was renamed to Fun & Games.

MSN Messenger received a major upgrade to version 7.0 on April 7, 2005. This version brought wink features that were previously only available in threedegrees. This version also advertised items to sell to you including animated display pictures, emoticons, and backgrounds. The contact list window style was also updated to match instant message windows. This version also introduced the Xbox Live Integration feature. This version also introduced digital ink and handwriting recognition support. It is the last version of MSN Messenger to support Windows 98, Windows Me, and Windows 2000.

The last version of MSN Messenger before the name change, version 7.5, was released August 23, 2005. New features included the Dynamic Backgrounds feature and the "msnim" protocol handler, which allowed Web sites to provide links which automatically add a contact or start conversations. Additionally, a new Voice Clips feature allowed users to hold down F2 and record a message for a maximum of 15 seconds and send it to the recipient. The window for conversations was changed slightly with an added video button. This version also introduced the Windows Installer for its auto-update feature. and can be used as a gaming platform

=== Windows Live Messenger 8.0–8.5 (2005–2009) ===
Windows Live Messenger logo

As part of Microsoft's Windows Live effort, which rebranded many existing MSN services and programs, MSN Messenger was renamed "Windows Live Messenger" beginning with version 8.0.

The first beta of the newly renamed Windows Live Messenger, Beta 1, was released on December 13, 2005. Major changes and additions included offline messaging, an option to change the color theme of the windows, separated Send and Search boxes, a word wheel search box in the main window, and additional details for contacts when hovering over their names in the contact list window.

The second beta of version 8.0, Beta 2, was released on February 26, 2006. The overall theme of this version was improved, fixing and improving several smaller places in the program. Major changes and additions included the introduction of Windows Live Contacts, the reintroduction of single file transfer, improvements to the "Add a Contact" dialog box, improved color themes, minor changes in the conversation window, and revert of the "Busy" status icon back to the normal dash icon and a redesign of the log in page.

The final beta version, Beta 3, was released on May 2, 2006. Major changes and additions included new icons for the program, PC-to-phone calling, an updated look for the Windows Live Call window, a new default display picture, the Windows Live Today window, improvements to the grouping of sequential messages from each contact, Rhapsody integration in the US, and an option for sounds to be edited and/or turned off and another redesign of the log in page,

Windows Live Messenger 8.0

The official release of Windows Live Messenger version 8.0 was on June 19, 2006. Although no notable changes were made between Beta 3 and the final version, the change from MSN Messenger to Windows Live Messenger brought some additional changes, such as customization for the nicknames of individual contacts, timestamps on messages, the ability to see a contact's name only once if the same person writes multiple messages in a row, and color schemes for the entire application. The main authentication system, Microsoft Passport Network, was replaced with Windows Live ID at the same time. A refresh to version 8.0 was released on August 10, 2006. It included audio and video improvements and fixed up minor bugs.

The first update to Windows Live Messenger was previewed on October 30, 2006, with the release of Beta 1 of version 8.1. No major changes were made, but several minor changes were included. These include the addition of the roaming identity feature (so that the same user's display name and picture would appear on any computer), a new contact card appearance, a "recently used" list for the emoticon, wink, display picture and background menus, an SMS phone book in the main menu allowing the association and editing of a phone number to the contact and allowing text messaging to a contact, a "sign out" button, a "report abuse" option in the help menu, interoperability with Yahoo! Messenger, and improvements to user status on Windows Vista.

A minor update, the Windows Live Messenger 8.1 Beta 1 Refresh, was released on December 13, 2006, and fixed bugs that were causing some people to be unable to sign in and others unable to see their contact list.

The final version 8.1 was released on January 29, 2007. No changes were made from the Beta 1 Refresh. All versions of Windows Live Messenger below version 8.1 were rendered obsolete on September 12, 2007, due to a security issue identified when a user accepts a webcam or video chat invitation from an attacker.

On September 12, 2007, the Windows Live Messenger blog posted a fix that resolved a security problem. It reported of a security vulnerability in versions of Messenger older than 8.1, that the released fix would resolve. This led to an auto-update being released to all older versions. Versions running on Windows 2000 and below were required to update to a new version of MSN Messenger 7.0, and versions running on Windows XP and above were required to update to Windows Live Messenger 8.1.

On August 27, 2009, the Windows Live Messenger blog posted that due to a security problem, all users of versions 8.1 and newer need to update to the latest version, 14.0.8089. The mandatory upgrade requirement would be fully phased in by late October 2009 and began on September 15, 2009.

The first beta of Windows Live Messenger 8.5, Beta 1, was released on May 31, 2007. An update was released on June 21, 2007, to test updates being installed by Microsoft Update. This version required Windows XP SP2, compared to previous versions requiring Windows XP SP1. It was the first version to be installed in a "Windows Live" folder under "Program Files", with the shortcuts placed in a "Windows Live" folder in the Start Menu.

Major changes and additions in Beta 1 included a new installation program in conjunction with the release of Windows Live 2.0, a new look for all of its windows that matches the aesthetic styles of Windows Vista, a new "bunny" emoticon, and integration with Windows Live OneCare Family Safety. Beginning with this version, updates could be downloaded and installed through Microsoft Update.

The second beta of Windows Live Messenger 8.5, Beta 2, was released on September 5, 2007. Several issues were fixed in Beta 2, but no significant changes were applied. Compared with the first beta, the build does not say "Beta" on the top of the window, although developers had noted that it was not the final release. The new Windows Live Installer, which is used to install Windows Live Messenger 8.5 Beta 2, does not run on Windows Server 2003.

The final release of Windows Live Messenger version 8.5 was released on November 6, 2007, and it introduced no major changes.

=== Windows Live Messenger 14.0–16.4 (2009–2012) ===
Windows Live Messenger, c. 2011

Windows Live Messenger 2009 was originally designated version 9.0, it was later assigned the technical version number 14.0, in order to be unified with the other Windows Live programs and Microsoft Office programs.

In a presentation to the Georgia Institute of Technology's IEEE Student Branch, Microsoft employee Andrew Jenks reported that the Messenger team had been working on multi-person audio/video chat, and they are also attempting to create interoperability with AIM/XMPP/ICQ. There is a basic internal version that works with XMPP already. However, these features were not seen in any versions of Windows Live Messenger 2009.

Microsoft sent an invitation to participate in the Windows Live Messenger "9" beta program to Microsoft Connect members on November 20, 2007; a week later, Microsoft began sending out emails welcoming them to the Windows Live Messenger "9" beta program for the first release, known as Beta 0.

A fan site for Windows Live Messenger, Mess.be, claimed to have a new build of Windows Live Messenger "9" on August 11, 2008, and published screenshots along with a brief summary of new features. The screenshots featured a new user interface design matching the "Wave 3" design in development by Microsoft. The images were later removed by the site after a DMCA notice was received. The installer for the same build was leaked through private forums on August 23, 2008. It would later be discovered this build was a preview of Milestone 2, or M2.

News web site LiveSide published an article on September 4, 2008, with screenshots of M2 of the newly minted "Windows Live Messenger 2009", which had become version 14.0 instead of 9.0 as previously expected. LiveSide summarized its new features, including protection against messaging spam, the ability to stay signed into the application from several computers (referred to as "Multiple Points of Presence Support"), animated GIF files in the photo area, per-contact customized sounds for various user actions, and clickable URLs in the status area.

Microsoft began the official beta program for Windows Live Messenger 2009 on September 17, 2008, when it released a new beta officially known as Windows Live Messenger 2009 Beta (Milestone 3, Build 14.0.5027.908), which was made available to the general public as a free download. The ability to submit feedback, however, was restricted to select participants of the Microsoft Connect closed beta program.

Notable changes in Milestone 3 include a new revamped and refined user interface to follow suit with the rest of the Windows Live "Wave 3" design, the ability to set a "Scene" by customizing the background image and color of the contact list, and the display of these scenes in conversation windows for improved contact identification and window management.

Milestone 3 also brings a new "Groups" feature that allows users to create a continuous group conversation between select contacts, newly redesigned status icons which now resemble small gems rather than the previous "Messenger Buddy" icons, a new default "Favorites" category in which you can place your favorite contacts for easy access to them, a new Photo Sharing utility that allows contacts to quickly and easily browse photos together, and a "What's New" section at the bottom of the contact list to outline recent contact updates. Display pictures have been moved over to the left side of conversation windows, and new colorful borders appear around display pictures to display the current status of that contact. Milestone 3 is the first version of Windows Live Messenger to use the standard window frame on Windows Vista in accordance with the user experience guidelines.

Several features were removed in version 9.0, however, such as the ability to use add-ins, the ability to transfer files when the recipient is signed in as offline, the "Be right back", "Out to lunch", and "In a call" status options, the Go to my space button, the ability to adjust webcam settings during a video call, the Send button, some games (depending on your localization) and integration with Windows Contacts. Other features were replaced, such as Sharing Folders (replaced by integration with Windows Live SkyDrive) and background sharing (replaced by the "Scene" feature).

On December 15, 2008, Windows Live Messenger 2009 RC (Build 14.0.8050.1202) was released together with the other Windows Live Wave 3 software applications, now renamed as Windows Live Essentials. This version saw a removal of the custom sign-in sound feature however it is still possible to select a sound for other individuals, as well as changes to how the background image chosen is applied to the conversation windows. This build also included over 200 bug fixes including the "Custom Emoticon Bug" and saving of pictures when using the Photo sharing feature. On January 7, 2009, the same build was released as the final version of Windows Live Messenger 2009.

The last QFE update for Wave 3 was released on May 12, 2010, and saw the removal of some features from Windows Live Messenger. Specifically, the ability to independently show only your own webcam or your contacts' webcam (one way webcam) and without an audio call is gone. It is only possible to start a video call which starts the webcams of both people communicating, and which also automatically starts audio calling. Also removed is the ability to import and save/export instant messaging contacts to and from .CTT files.

In late March 2010, a beta of Windows Live Essentials Wave 4 was leaked onto the internet and has since spread to various BitTorrent networks, which included a private beta build of Windows Live Messenger Wave 4. However, as the software was designed for private beta testing, non-beta testers cannot sign into this leaked build.

The new software features a revamped interface which brings the "What's new" section of Windows Live to the new "social pane", similar to the way a social networking site presents updates. Among the new features are tabbed conversations, a redesign of the old emoticons, integration of Bing results, built-in video message support, HD video chat, in-line commenting of social updates, a new social photo viewer that supports commenting (for Facebook and SkyDrive photos), badges support, synchronized status updates, availability by categories, as well as integration with Facebook chat. However, several features had also been removed from the previous version, such as the removal of display names, handwriting tool, one-way webcam requests and import/export of instant messaging contacts feature. The "Wave 4" release of Windows Live Essentials, which includes Messenger, also dropped compatibility with Windows XP and only runs on Windows Vista or Windows 7.

The new Windows Live Messenger for iOS became available on the App Store on June 21, 2010, in addition to other mobile versions of Windows Live Messenger for Windows Phone, BlackBerry, and Symbian mobile platforms.

On June 24, 2010, a public beta of Windows Live Messenger Wave 4 was released as part of the new Windows Live Essentials beta. A "beta refresh" of Windows Live Messenger Wave 4 was released on August 17, 2010, as part of an upgraded Windows Live Essentials beta. The final version of Windows Live Messenger 2011 (Wave 4) was released on September 30, 2010. On the same date, a version of Windows Live Messenger for Zune HD also became available.

On June 14, 2012, Microsoft made the update from 2009 to 2011 mandatory for those using Windows Vista or 7. 2009 continues to be usable for those still running XP. This can be circumvented by running Windows Live Messenger in Windows XP compatibility mode, thus making it believe it is running on Windows XP.

On August 7, 2012, Microsoft delivered a new version of the Windows Essentials 2012 suite, which includes Windows Live Messenger 2012.

=== Discontinuation and legacy ===
On November 6, 2012, Microsoft announced that Messenger and Skype services would merge in the first quarter of 2013. According to Tony Bates (president of Skype Division at the time), Messenger users could sign into Skype using their Microsoft accounts, access their Messenger contacts and communicate as usual. On January 8, 2013, Microsoft emailed Messenger users and informed them that with the exception of mainland China, the Messenger service would stop working on March 15, 2013, and users would not be able to sign in.

On February 15, 2013, ZDNet wrote the discontinuation email was only sent to one percent of Messenger users, a test group. On the same day, Microsoft announced its plans to phase out Messenger: the process would start on April 8, 2013, with English users and would end on April 30, 2013; Messenger would remain available in mainland China. According to ZDNet, this might only apply to the ability to sign in with Messenger client; Microsoft would keep its Messenger service running for another year. "Windows Live Messenger Upgrades to Skype", as they were referred to by Microsoft, started on April 8, 2013. This transition took place language by language. Brazil was the last country to be "upgraded", on April 30.

Chinese Messenger users received an email from Microsoft in August 2014, containing an announcement that Messenger service in China would end on October 31, 2014; users were advised to migrate to Skype and receive free credits.

In 2017 a number of developers managed to reverse engineer the Messenger protocol and designed custom servers that make the MSN/Windows Live Messenger functional again. The service is now provided under the name Escargot.

== Features ==
In addition to its basic functionality and general capability as an instant messaging client, the latest version of Windows Live Messenger offered the following features:

=== Album Viewer ===
Windows Live Messenger's album viewer is based on Windows Photo Gallery and provides users a photo viewing experience for photo albums shared via SkyDrive and Facebook. The album viewer is interactive and supports full screen and slideshow modes, as well as viewing and uploading comments on Facebook and SkyDrive albums. It also supports people tagging for SkyDrive. The album viewer closely resembles the Microsoft Silverlight counterpart for web photo albums present on SkyDrive.

=== Appear offline to individuals or categories ===
Windows Live Messenger allows users to appear offline to particular individual contacts, as well as to an entire category within Windows Live Messenger, while appearing online to other contacts.

This is a recent feature of Windows Live Messenger 2011, and is a departure from the previous versions of Windows Live Messenger, where blocking a contact would prevent the "blockee" from sending the user any messages to the "blocker". With the "appear offline to" configuration currently implemented, "hidden from" users can still send "offline messages" to the target.

=== Social networks integration ===
Users can connect services such as Facebook, MySpace and LinkedIn using Windows Live Profile, and display their contact's Messenger social updates within the "Full view" of Windows Live Messenger. Users can also post status updates and photos directly to the connected services within Windows Live Messenger. Additionally, Messenger also imports all contacts from the connected services and integrates with Facebook Chat (via the XMPP protocol) for instant messaging support with users on Facebook.

=== Offline messaging ===
One can send messages to contacts who are offline; they will receive the messages once they come online. Additionally, a user can start conversations even when their status is set to Appear Offline in Windows Live Messenger 2009 or before.

=== Games and applications ===
There are various games and applications available in Windows Live Messenger that can be accessed via the conversation window by clicking on the games icon, and challenging your friend or contact to a competition in a game, or inviting them to launch a shared external application.

=== Messenger Companion ===
Windows Live Messenger Companion

Windows Live Messenger Companion was an add-in for Windows Internet Explorer that detected when a user is on a website that one of their friends has shared content from and surfaces that update so that the user can instantly view what their friends have shared and leave a comment to the shared content on Windows Live. The service utilizes Windows Live ID and integrates tightly with Windows Live Messenger to obtain the user's contact list and their shared contents. The features of Windows Live Messenger Companion include:

- Sharing links to web pages with the user's friends on Windows Live within the web browser
- See links to web pages the user's friends have shared
- Add comments to the links the user's friends have shared

Windows Live Messenger Companion was made available as part of Windows Live Essentials 2011. However, Microsoft discontinued Messenger Companion in its newer Windows Essentials 2012 suite.

=== Protocol ===
Windows Live Messenger used the Microsoft Notification Protocol (MSNP) over TCP (and optionally over HTTP to deal with proxies) to connect to Microsoft Messenger service—a service offered on port 1863 of "messenger.hotmail.com."

The protocol is not completely secret; Microsoft disclosed version 2 (MSNP2) to developers in 1999 in an Internet Draft, but never released versions 8 or higher to the public. The Messenger service servers currently only accept protocol versions from 8 and higher, so the syntax of new commands sent from versions 8 and higher is only known by using packet sniffers like Wireshark. This has been an easy task because – in comparison to many other modern instant messaging protocols, such as XMPP – the Microsoft Notification Protocol does not provide any encryption and everything can be captured easily using packet sniffers. The lack of proper encryption also makes wiretapping friend lists and personal conversations a trivial task, especially in unencrypted public Wi-Fi networks.

=== Content filtering ===
The content of users' messages is filtered by the message servers, as opposed to the client. For example, the user cannot send links to The Pirate Bay's pages neither from the Windows Live Messenger, nor through other clients supporting the protocol. However, links to other P2P networks are allowed.

=== "i'm" initiative ===
The i'm initiative was a program Microsoft launched in March 2007, that connects the user with ten organizations dedicated to social causes through Windows Live Messenger, only for conversations sent or received in the USA. Every time someone had a conversation using i'm, Microsoft Corp. shared a portion of the program's advertising revenue with the organization of the user's choice. There was no set cap on the amount donated to each organization. The more i'm conversations the user had, the more money went to one of the ten causes. Each participating organization was guaranteed a minimum donation of $100,000 during the first year of the program. The i'm initiative worked with version 8.1 and above.

In March 2010, the initiative concluded, having raised over 3 million dollars.

== Interoperability ==
On October 13, 2005, Yahoo and Microsoft announced plans to add interoperability between their messenger services. The announcement came after years of third-party interoperability success (most notably, PowWow by Tribal Voice, Trillian, Pidgin) and criticisms from Tribal Voice and iCast that the major real time communications services were locking their networks. Yahoo! and Windows Live Messenger became interoperable on July 12, 2006. For six years, Yahoo! Messenger and Windows Live Messenger users in possession of up-to-date software could communicate across the two networks. Instant messaging as well as transmission of emoticons, nudges, offline messages, presence information, and personal status messages were supported. On December 14, 2012, the interoperability ended.

Interoperability with Facebook Chat was added on September 30, 2010, with the launch of Windows Live Messenger 2011.

== Other platforms ==
Versions were developed for Windows, Xbox 360, Mac OS X (later under the name Microsoft Messenger for Mac), BlackBerry OS, iOS, Java ME, S60 on Symbian OS 9.x, MSN TV, Zune HD, Windows Phone, Windows Mobile, and Windows CE.

=== Mac ===
Sign In screen of Messenger for Mac v8.0.0 on Mac OS X Snow Leopard

Microsoft Messenger for Mac (previously MSN Messenger for Mac) was the official Mac OS X instant messaging client for use with Microsoft Messenger service, developed by the Macintosh Business Unit, a division of Microsoft. Its feature list was limited in comparison to that of its counterpart Windows Live Messenger; the client lacked a number of features that its Windows counterpart contained.

Microsoft Messenger for Mac 7 and newer do not support Live Communications Server 2005. The latest version to support this server was version 6.0.3.

Webcam and audio support was delayed due to Windows Live Messenger's webcam and audio engine being reworked, which meant that the Mac version had to wait until this was complete in order for both platform releases to function correctly.

Prior to version 3, the program's interface resembled that of Windows Messenger 4.0. Versions 3 to 4.0.1 featured an Aqua interface, while versions 5 and newer used the brushed metal theme.

Microsoft Messenger for Mac
| Messenger version | Minimum operating system | Messenger release date |
|---|---|---|
| 2.1 | 8.6 (Classic only) | March 19, 2002 |
| 2.5.1 | 9.2.2 (Classic only) | July 26, 2004 |
| 3.5 | 10.1 | July 12, 2003 |
| 4.0.1 | 10.2.8 | October 12, 2004 |
| 5.1.1 | 10.3 | March 29, 2006 |
| 6.0.3 | 10.3.9 | August 21, 2007 |
| 7.0.2 | 10.4 (PPC) | February 5, 2009 |
| 8.0.0 | 10.5.8 (Intel) | October 24, 2010 |

=== Mobile devices ===
Messenger Mobile WAP version

Messenger Mobile (formerly named Windows Live Messenger Mobile) was the version of Messenger that was aimed to be used on mobile devices over a cellular data plan or Wi-Fi (if supported by the phone). There was also a WAP-compatible version that may be used on any mobile device, and also specific client versions designed for compatible BlackBerry, iOS, Nokia, Sony Ericsson and Windows Mobile devices.

A client version of Windows Live Messenger Mobile was a part of client application named "Windows Live for Windows Mobile" included with the Windows Mobile 6 operating system. It was included on both Windows Mobile 6 smartphone edition (non-touch screen phones) and professional (touch screen phones). Some of the features included voice clips (up to 10 seconds long), pictures and emoticons.

The Windows Live Messenger for iOS client supported receiving of instant messaging notifications even when the application closed, and allowed Multiple Points of Presence (MPOP) such that a user can be signed into multiple locations at the same time. Photos and albums could also be uploaded from the mobile devices onto Windows Live Photos, based on SkyDrive, and the application allowed simple image editing capabilities and people tagging within the photos. The application also supported the "Messenger social" feed on Windows Live Profile, allowing users to view and comment on the social updates and activities of their contacts on Windows Live, as well as those on Facebook, MySpace, and LinkedIn once these social networks had been connected to Windows Live as a "Service".

A client for Windows Live Messenger was developed by Microsoft for the Symbian S60 Platform commonly used on mobile phones such as Nokia smartphones and released on August 23, 2007, to selected markets. In May 2009, the client was made available on the Ovi Store. This version of Windows Live Messenger included many of the features of the Windows Live Messenger client, including grouped contacts, voice clips (up to 10 seconds long), image and file sending; as well as features unique to S60 such as tabbed chat windows and integration with contact list and other features of the S60 platform. When the trial expires the cost to users of Messenger for S60 is £1.50/$2.94 for 30 calendar days of use. As of February 2009, Microsoft stopped charging for Windows Live Mobile and the service was offered for free.

=== MSN TV (WebTV) ===
MSN Messenger on MSN TV 2

Starting in the summer of 2000, the Microsoft-owned web access product MSN TV (then known as WebTV) introduced a software upgrade for users of its internet terminals that added a basic messaging client among other features. The messaging client was designed to work with the Microsoft Messenger service and was simply named MSN Messenger. The client for the original WebTV/MSN TV internet terminals supported basic presence, plain text messages (no graphical emoticons), and buddy lists, with the overall WebTV/MSN TV service hosting services for users to add, remove, or block Messenger contacts and manage their Messenger settings. Windows Live Messenger support was later added to the MSN TV 2, introducing a new UI to fit the rest of the MSN TV 2's interface and support for graphical emotions. It's believed these clients still worked up until the discontinuation of the MSN TV service in September 2013.

Although WebTV was also available in Japan well before the Summer 2000 upgrade was introduced in the US, it does not appear that Japanese WebTV users ever received this Messenger feature.

=== Xbox ===
Windows Live Messenger support was included in the Xbox 360 spring 2007 dashboard update released on May 9, 2007. It was known as Xbox Live Messenger.

Those using Windows Live Messenger were able to see the Gamertags of friends logged into Xbox Live, including the games that they were playing. Xbox 360 users could chat in-game or while watching a movie. Although only text chat was supported, Microsoft suggested that voice and video chatting would come in a future update. Support for child accounts was added in December 2007.

To coincide with the arrival of the integration of Windows Live Messenger with Xbox Live, Microsoft released a new Xbox 360 keyboard adapter called the Xbox 360 Messenger Kit for easier text input. The keyboard device attaches to the standard Xbox 360 controller through the headphone jack and features a QWERTY-style key layout with 47 backlit keys. However, any USB keyboard is also compatible with the Xbox 360.

Microsoft also announced on June 14, 2010, that users on Xbox LIVE with the controller-free Kinect could have real-time video conversations with Windows Live Messenger contacts. This feature was enabled at launch.

== See also ==
- Comparison of instant messaging clients
- Comparison of instant messaging protocols
- Microsoft Lync
- Messenger Plus! Live
- Windows Live Web Messenger
