= Balderton Capital =

British venture capital firm

Coordinates: 51.529792°N 0.118778°W

- Type: Private
- Industry: Venture capital
- Founded: 2000; 26 years ago
- Headquarters: London, WC1; United Kingdom
- Key people: Bernard Liautaud, Daniel Waterhouse, Suranga Chandratillake, James Wise, Rob Moffat, Rana Yared
- Total assets: $7.0 billion
- Number of employees: 60
- Website: www.balderton.com

Balderton Capital is a venture capital firm based in London, UK, that invests in early and growth stage, technology and internet startup companies in Europe. It is considered to be among the four biggest venture capital firms in the English capital.

== History ==
Founded in 2000 as Benchmark Capital Europe, Balderton Capital became fully independent in 2007. The company made over 100 early-stage investments between 2000 and 2020, including Revolut, Dream Games, The Hut Group, MySQL, Yoox, Depop, Talend, Recorded Future, NaturalMotion, Quantum Systems, GoCardless, CityMapper, Wayve, and Sophia Genetics.

== Partners ==
The partners of the firm are: Bernard Liautaud, Tim Bunting, Suranga Chandratillake, Rob Moffat, Daniel Waterhouse, James Wise, and Rana Yared.

== Funding ==
In November 2019, Balderton announced Balderton VII, a new $400m fund to invest in European companies at Series A. The new fund will reportedly make approximately 12 investments annually. In 2018, Balderton announced the first fund dedicated to buying equity from existing shareholders of European technology startups. In 2021, Balderton announced the first fund dedicated to growth, with $680M under management and a further $600M for early stage investing, bringing its total assets to over $5B. In 2024 they raised a further $1.3B across their Early and Growth funds, the largest raise for a European venture firm at the time.

== Investments ==
Notable investments have included:

- 3D Hubs
- Aircall
- Appear Here
- Bebo (sold to AOL for $850M)
- Betfair (Went public and now merged as Paddy Power Betfair)
- Big Fish Games (sold to Churchill Downs for $885m)
- Carwow
- Circle (healthcare partnership)
- Citymapper
- Funnel
- Globoforce
- Kobalt Music Group
- Lovefilm
- MySQL (sold to Sun Microsystems for $1B)
- NaturalMotion (sold to Zynga)
- Prodigy Finance
- Rebtel
- Revolut
- McMakler
- Setanta Sports (liquidated)
- Sophia Genetics
- Sunrise Calendar
- Talend (public on NASDAQ)
- The Hut Group
- Tictail
- Vivino
- Wooga
- Yoox
- Lassie

== Exits ==
Since 2008, Balderton has had many prominent exits, including Betfair ($2bn IPO of which they owned 3.95%), Bebo ($850m sale to AOL), Depop ($1.65B sale to Etsy), Scansafe (sale to Cisco, 30% stake), Lovefilm (sale to Amazon.com, 5% stake), Yoox ($700m IPO), MySQL ($1bn sale to Sun Microsystems, 15% stake), Big Fish Games (sold to Churchill Downs for $885m), Recorded Future ($780m sale to Insight Partners), Sunrise (sold to Microsoft), Talend (2016, $1.5B Nasdaq IPO), Sophia Genetics (2021, $1.2B Nasdaq IPO), Darktrace (2021, $3.5B FTSE IPO), Prior Labs (sold to SAP for €1B), Frontier Car Group (majority bought by OLX in 2019 for $700M), and Magic Pony Technologies (sold to Twitter).
