= Impact of the COVID-19 pandemic on public transport =

Effects of COVID-19 viral outbreak on public transport

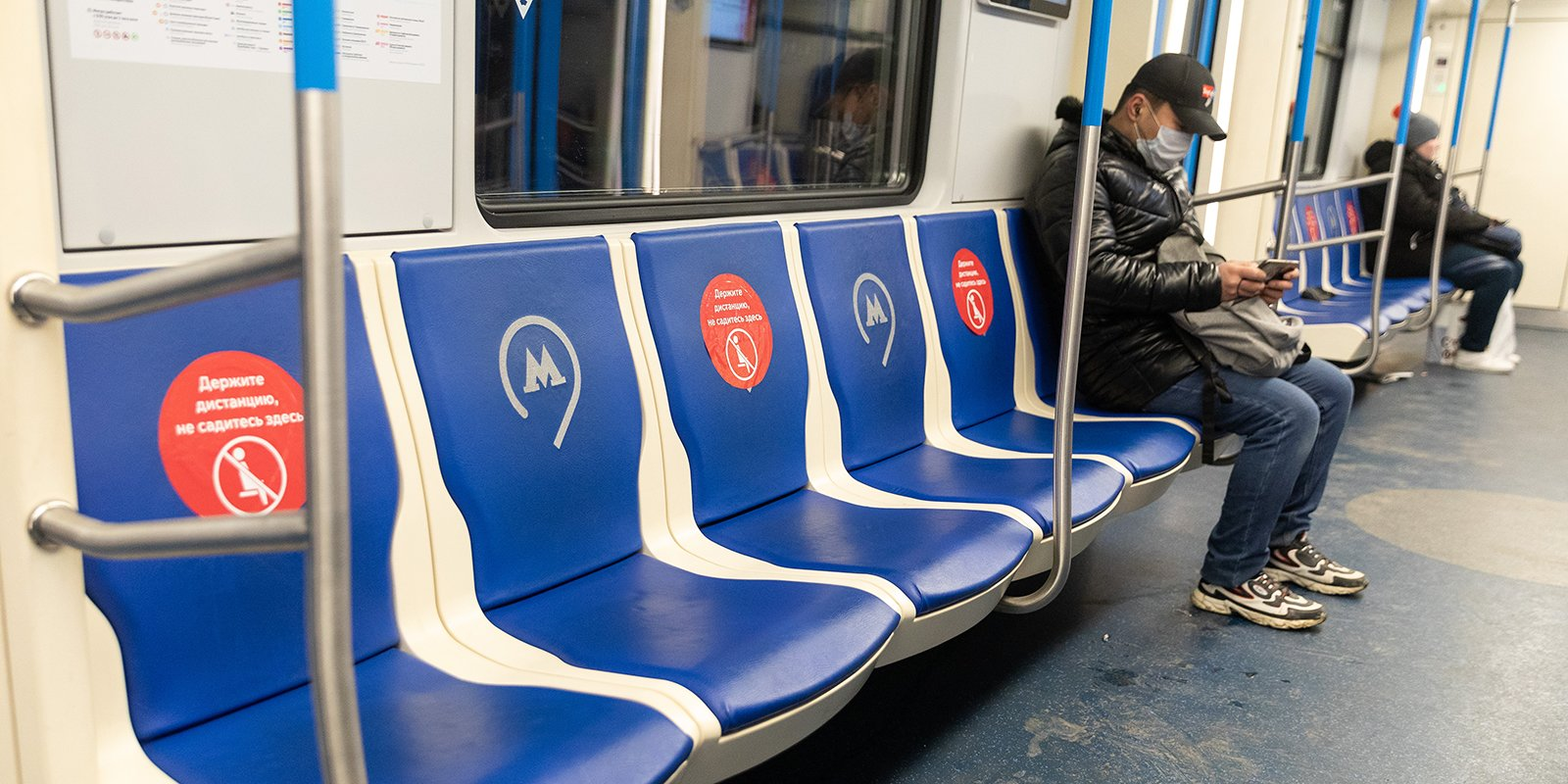
Red stickers placed every other seat in a Moscow Metro train encourage social distancing

The COVID-19 pandemic had a large impact on public transport. Many countries advised that public transport should only be used when needed, the number of passenger fell drastically, and services were reduced. Provision of a reasonable service for the much smaller number of fare-paying passengers incurred large financial losses.

Protective measures such as obligatory mask-wearing and spacing of passengers where possible were introduced, and ventilation and sanitation (disinfection) were implemented. Protection required passengers and operators to make many changes to the way they operated and behaved.

== The risks ==
It was suggested in March 2021 that the use of public transport had led to the spread of COVID-19. There has been little evidence that mass transit poses a risk of covid infection. According to Santé Publique France (Public Health France) in June 2020, none of 150 clusters of infection studied were due to public transport; it was suggested that this was helped by spacing passengers out, mask wearing, and disinfection of surfaces. Also, people talk and move little, especially when travelling alone.

By October 2020 according to the Union Internationale des Transports Publics (UITP) there was evidence that, when appropriate measures are implemented, the risk of catching COVID-19 in public transport is very low. The UITP article said that analysis in the UK by the industry-funded Rail Research and Safety Board (RSSB) found that the probability of catching covid on a rail journey was 1 in 11,000 journeys. Later figures have not been released, but are believed to be significantly higher, and expected to increase with the relaxation of COVID-19 restrictions in July 2021 (see United Kingdom section).

Modelling at the US University of Colorado Boulder in North America found that the risk of being infected in a well-ventilated metro, or a bus, with minimal talking and movement is 0 percent after 70 minutes.

== COVID-19 protective measures ==
The U.S. Centers for Disease Control and Prevention issued guidance documents on COVID-19 protective measures for passengers and operators of public transportation and hire cars with drivers, updated from time to time. Much of the CDC advice is of general applicability in non-US jurisdictions. Non-essential travel is to be avoided. Drivers and passengers should (or in some jurisdictions must) wear face coverings, avoid frequently touched surfaces, and sit at least six feet apart if possible. To protect bus drivers, passengers can enter and exit through a door far from the driver. Avoid handling cash or payment cards. Frequently touched surfaces should be routinely cleaned. Signage and other visual cues such as decals and tape can alert passengers on appropriate COVID-19 precautions and seat designations. Travelers are encouraged to carry hand sanitizer and disinfectant wipes with them. Necessary travel is best done during non-peak hours when passengers can be spaced further apart.

== Research and development ==
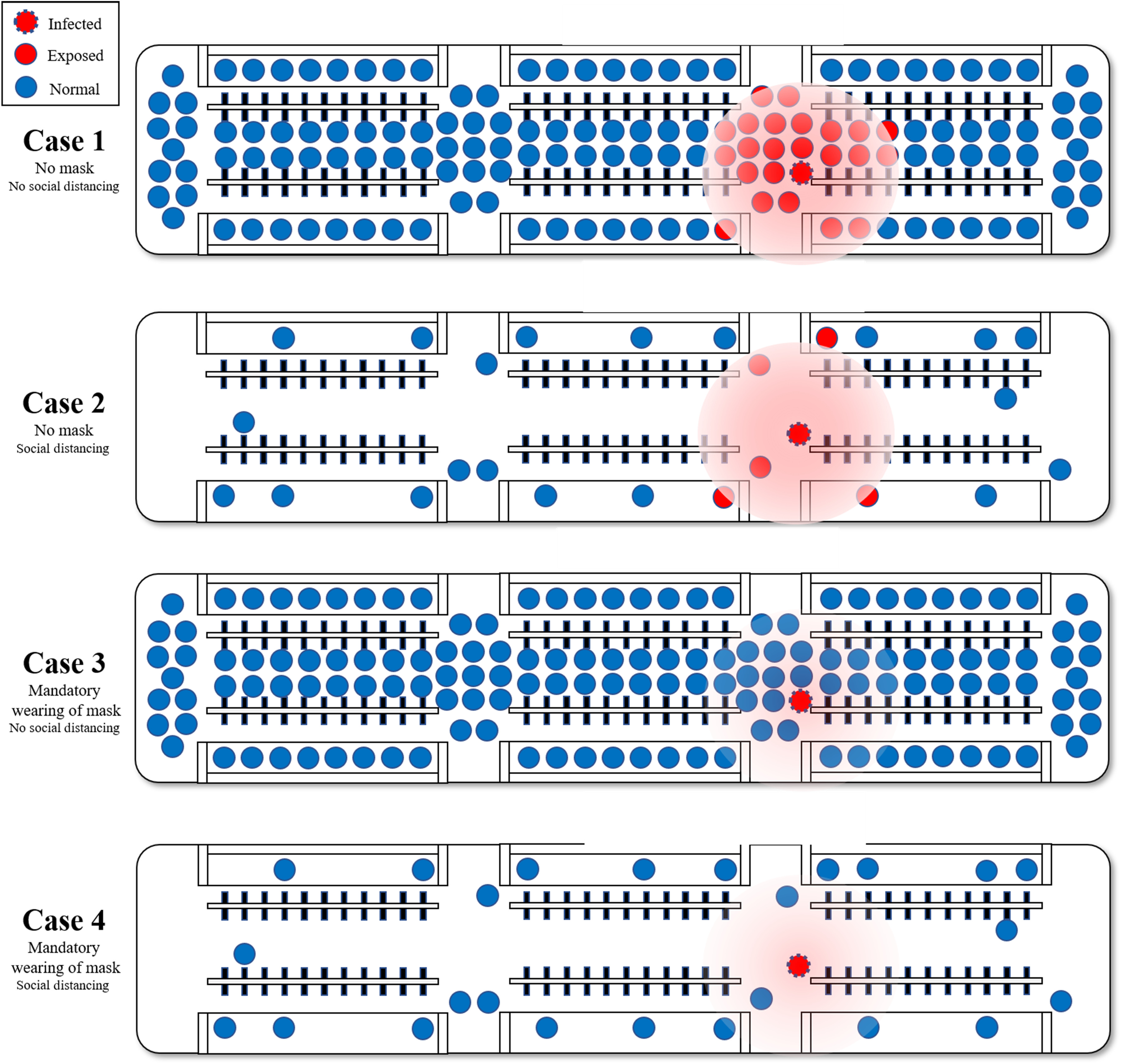
Prediction of the actual transmission probability according to quarantine policies such as mandatory mask wearing and social distancing.

Researchers investigate safe ways of public transport during the COVID-19 pandemic.

A study finds that mandatory face masks and social distancing can allow for relatively safe public transport – in particular of otherwise contemporary ways, established types, designs and procedures of public transport – during the COVID-19 pandemic, reducing infection rates by 93.5 percent and 98.1 percent in tracking-based simulations of common contemporary forms of public transport during congestion peak-hour.

One study tested different virus mitigation technologies in a bus, suggesting that photocatalytic oxidation inserts, UV-C light and positive pressure environment could be efficacious and that it is important that masks are worn.

Field trials of novel durably biocide treated air purifiers for preventing the spread of airborne pathogens were conducted onboard public rail transport.

Proposals for further measures include preventing overcrowded vehicles (or distributing passengers evenly) such as via on-demand services and redesigned services, requiring a proof of vaccination to enter trains, improvements to corona-tracing apps for public transport, smart card data validations, and further research.

A study investigated whether there is an association between public transportation and influenza mortality (as an indicator of disease prevalence), using data from 121 large cities in the U.S., and found no evidence of a positive relationship.

== Asia ==
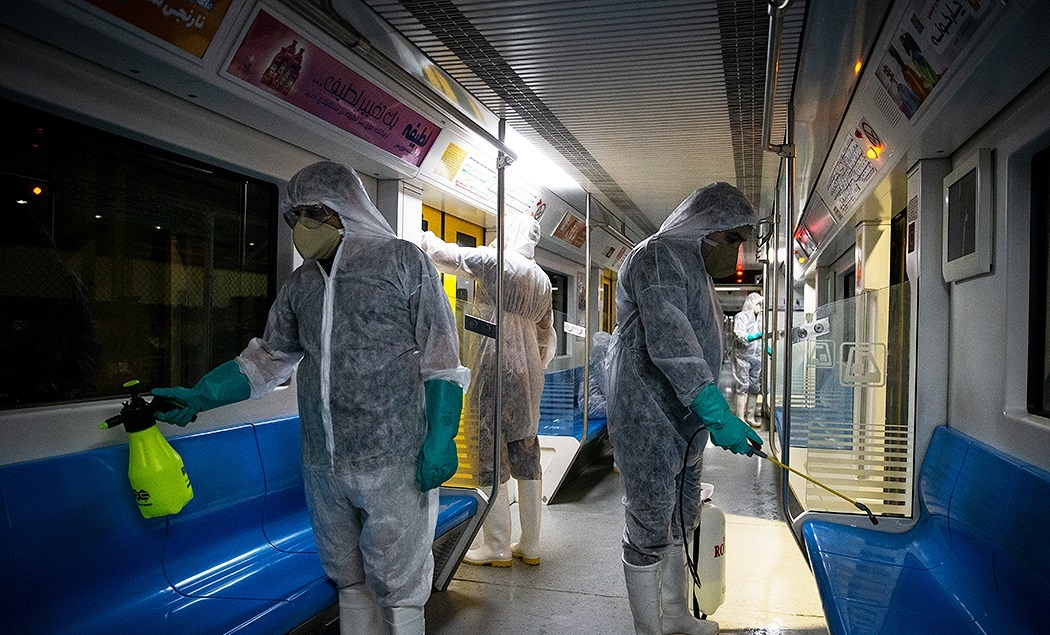
Disinfection of Tehran Metro trains against coronavirus

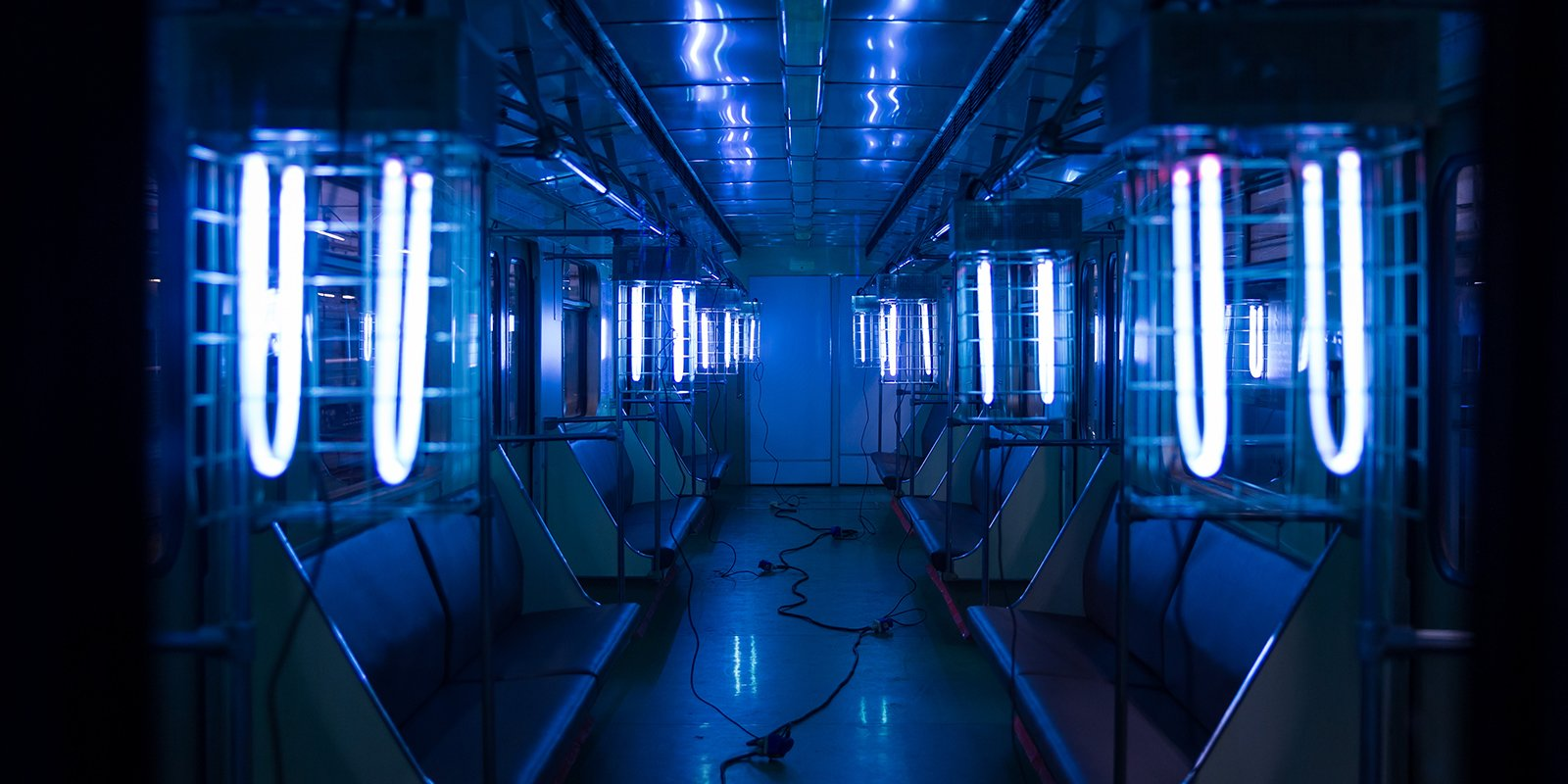
Ultra-violet lights are used to disinfect trains in Moscow, Russia

=== China ===
On 23 January 2020, the entire Wuhan Metro network was shut down, along with all other public transport in the city, including national railway and air travel, to halt the spread of the virus.

On January 24, 2020, the day after the lockdown was declared in the city of Wuhan, the Beijing Subway began testing the body temperature of passengers at the entry points of 55 subway stations including the three main railway stations and the capital airport. Temperature checks were expanded to all subway stations by January 27. To further control the spread of the virus, certain Line 6 trains were outfitted with smart surveillance cameras that can detect passengers who are not wearing masks.

On 28 March 2020, six lines of Wuhan Metro (Line 1, 2, 3, 4, 6, 7) resumed operation, after a two-month lockdown. On 8 April 2020, Phase 1 of Line 8 resumed operation. On 22 April 2020, Line 8 Phase 3, Line 11, Yangluo line resumed operations.

China has largely contained the COVID-19 outbreak since June 2020, allowing for subway ridership and service to gradually recover to pre-pandemic levels. Several subway systems such the Changsha Metro and Hefei Metro posted ridership growth in 2020 due to opening of new lines. Several Chinese metro networks broke historic daily ridership records on 2020's New Year's Eve. Overall annual ridership of major Chinese public transport systems fell around 35 percent in 2020 compared to pre-pandemic ridership.

=== India ===
Various Indian states announced local and state level partial and incremental transport shutdown as early as March 11, 2020.

=== Indonesia ===
Restrictions have been implemented to public transport in Jakarta, Indonesia.

Transportation Ministry Greater Jakarta Transportation Agency (BPTJ) head Polana B. Pramesti said that Jakarta in particular had initiated various restrictions including transportation restrictions in March. "After the official, large-scale social restrictions (PSBB) status it can be ascertained that public transportation user numbers have declined as people's mobility has been limited," she added.

=== Philippines ===
In the Philippines, public transportation has been suspended in Luzon as part of the implementing measures of the enhanced community quarantine. In the absence of public transport, citizens could only resort to using their own private vehicle, but the critical role played by public transport cannot be replaced fully by private vehicles. In June, several regions in Luzon that were previously in enhanced community quarantine were downgraded to general community quarantine, allowing the use of public transportation in limited capacity and subject to social distancing protocols.

=== Turkey ===
On 20 March, free public transportation for people 65 years of age or older was temporarily suspended in Balıkesir, Konya and Malatya to encourage them to stay at home. A day later, similar measures started to be imposed in Ankara, Antalya and İzmir. On 24 March, it was announced that public transportation vehicles that work in and across the cities could fill up only 50 percent of their capacity with people at a time.

== Europe ==
At the start of the second wave of the COVID-19 pandemic, demand for public transportation in the top EU economies declined just 20% according to Google Mobility Reports. Traffic to key transportation hubs fell by 30%-40%, while traffic to workplaces fell by 20%-30%.

=== Denmark ===
In August 2020, Denmark made face masks compulsory on public transport.

=== France ===
Based on data released by Transit, France saw the largest decrease in use of public transport. This included a 92 percent decrease in Lyon and an 85 percent decrease in Nice.

France made face masks compulsory on public transport when it eased COVID-19 lockdowns on 11 May 2020.

According to the French statistical agency INSEE, 3% of the French labor force frequently teleworks. 2% of French workers travel fewer than 5 kilometers from their home to work, and 8% must travel more than 50 km.

=== Germany ===
In Germany, after COVID-19 lockdowns were lifted, face masks were mandatory on public transport. This mandate was lifted in February 2023. At the same time, Health Minister Karl Lauterbach encouraged the voluntary use of masks indoors and on trains.

=== Ireland ===
By April 2020, Dublin Airport was only running repatriation flights, or those with vital supplies (a reduction of more than 95 percent from the same week in 2019); Cork Airport was reduced to three return flights each day, all of which went to and from London, the first of which left at 4 pm and the last returning at 7:30 pm; Ireland West Airport had no commercial flights and both daily flights to and from Kerry Airport went to Dublin.

On 27 March, the National Transport Authority announced that operators of public transport services are to move to a new schedule of services on a phased basis from 30 March. Revised timetables for Iarnród Éireann came into effect on 30 March, while those for Dublin Bus, Go-Ahead Ireland, and Bus Éireann, came into effect on 1 April. Under the revised timetables, services ran at approximately 80 percent of current levels. Many public transport timetables returned to normal by 29 June, but social distancing requirements meant that overall passenger capacity remained restricted.

On 10 July, the Minister for Health Stephen Donnelly signed regulations to make the wearing of face masks mandatory on public transport, which came into effect on 13 July. Those who refuse to comply to regulations can face fines of up to €2,500 and a possible jail sentence of six months. Figures from the National Transport Authority showed levels of compliance of between 70 percent and 95 percent on buses, trains and trams. Bus Éireann reported a compliance rate of 95 percent on its services, Iarnród Éireann said it was 90 percent, Dublin Bus reported a rate of about 80 percent and Luas said it was between 75 percent and 80 percent. On 21 July, the Department of Health announced that face shields will be accepted as an alternative to a face covering on public transport.

Prevented the reopening of all closed railway lines along the island of Ireland.

=== United Kingdom ===
In 2020 bus, air, and train services were reduced in the United Kingdom. Initially public transport use declined by around 90% in London since the COVID-19 lockdowns were implemented. London's mayor Sadiq Khan made all bus travel free from 20 April and told passengers to only board by the middle doors in a bid to protect bus drivers, after 20 of them and several TfL employees died from COVID-19. Bus travel fares were reinstated from 23 May, after a conditional bailout of Transport for London by the Department for Transport. From 15 June it became compulsory to wear a face covering on public transport in England.

Throughout the pandemic, people had been told not to use public transport for non-essential travel, to help stop the spread of COVID-19 and allow for social distancing in carriages for essential workers. This advice was rescinded on 17 July 2020, in advance of further easing of lockdown measures, including the removal of remote work advice.

Based on data released by Moovit, the United Kingdom saw a significant decrease in the use of public transport during April 2020. This included an 80 percent decrease in London and South East, 79 percent in Yorkshire, 71 percent in West Midlands, 80 percent in the South West, 76 percent in the North West, and 78 percent in Scotland. This caused severe financial problems; for example Transport for London (TfL) in May 2020 applied for £2 billion in state aid to continue operating until September, having lost 90 percent of its income. The recording year April 2020 to March 2021 had the fewest UK rail journeys since records began in 1872.

Many restrictions on travel were to be relaxed on 19 July 2021. In particular, social distancing and use of face coverings was no longer mandated by law, although many travel operators continued to require face coverings.

In July 2020 the risk of rail travel was found by the industry-funded Rail Research and Safety Board (RSSB) to be one infection in 11,000 journeys. As of July 2021 the RSSB continues to present an average risk figure fortnightly to rail executives; this figure is not divulged publicly. Senior rail executives and Department for Transport officials are known to have been presented with figures showing the risk increasing significantly. While there has been pressure from passenger groups to release data so that travellers can make informed decisions, in July 2021 the RSSB said only that the risks of transmission on trains are "tolerably low". It is thought to be much higher on long-distance journeys. Relaxation of covid controls later that month would lead to increasing passenger numbers, and abolition of the legal requirement for face coverings was expected to cause further increase.

=== Greece ===
Because of COVID-19 concerns, 34% of individuals in the Greek city of Thessaloniki stopped utilizing public transportation, and over 70% stated they would prefer more buses on the road to reduce the possibilities of cars being overcrowded.

== North America ==
=== Canada ===
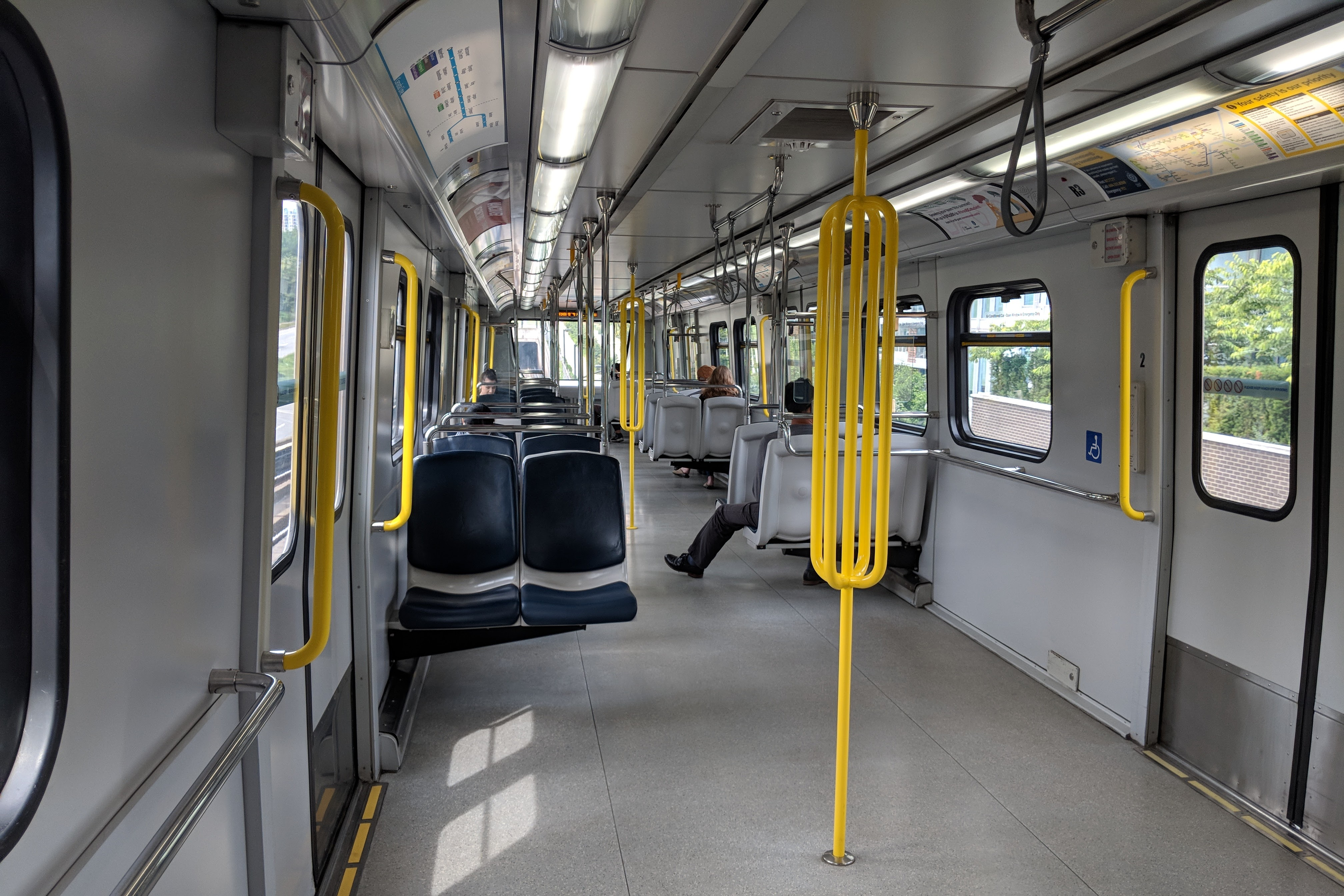
An almost empty SkyTrain in Vancouver, British Columbia, Canada

Based on data released by Transit, demand for public transport in Canada dropped an average of 83 percent in late March compared to previous years. On March 17, the Edmonton Transit Service started using Saturday schedules for all of its routes 7 days a week. On April 1, Calgary Transit also reduced service. In Saskatoon, ridership had dropped by over 80 percent by March 30.

Ridership on the Greater Toronto Area's two largest transit systems, Toronto Transit Commission (TTC) and GO Transit, had fallen 80 to 90 percent by April 13, and both had reduced service and/or suspended routes. The TTC and GO Transit have suspended the ability for customers paying their fares with cash (or tokens in the case for TTC services) on their public transit buses until further notice. On April 14, Metro Vancouver's TransLink said they were losing CA$75 million per month, and would need emergency funding or be forced to cut large amounts of local services. In Montreal, the Metro reported an 80 percent drop in ridership by March 26. In the northern suburb of Laval, the STL had cut 45 percent of local bus service.

=== United States ===
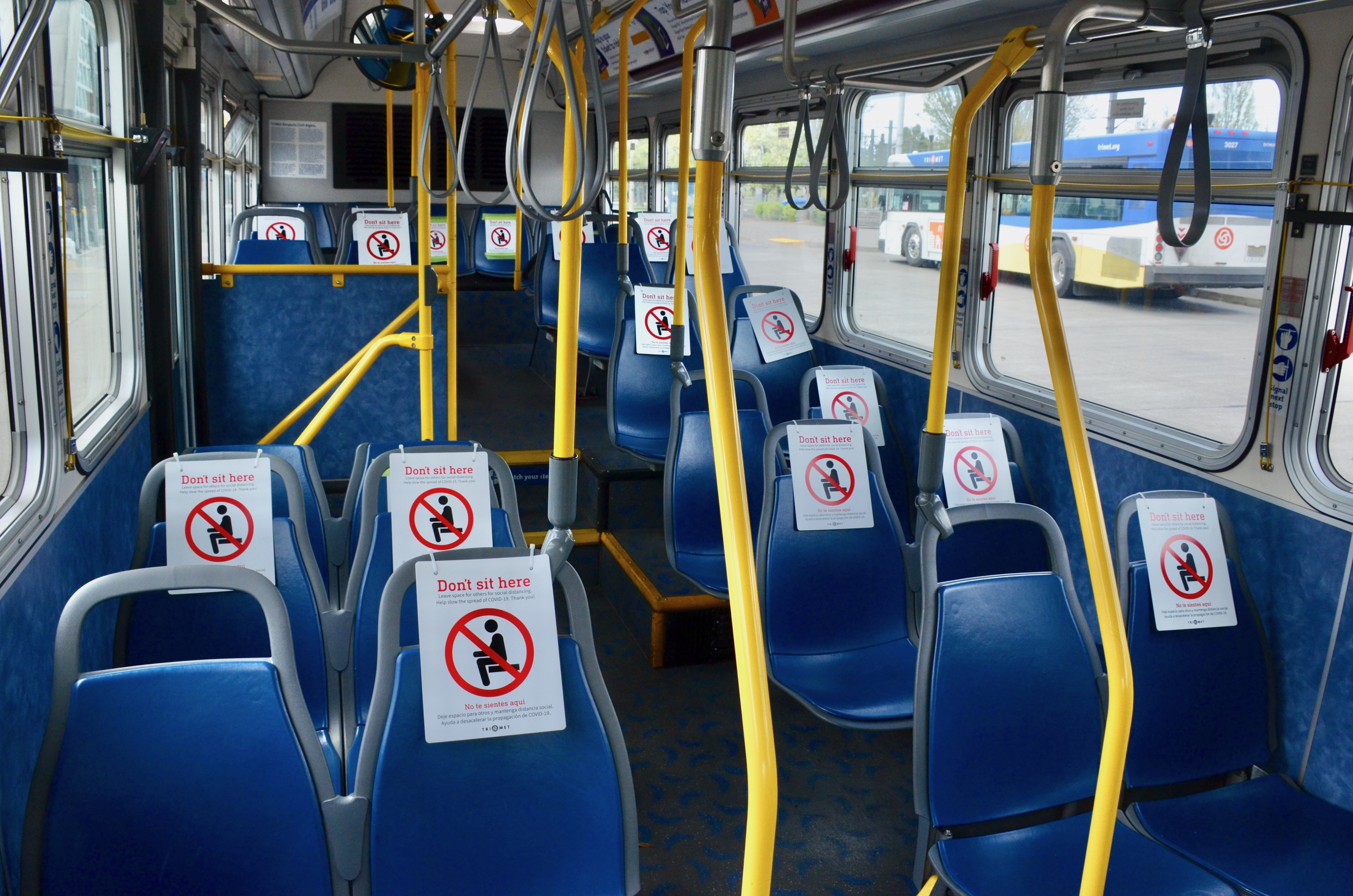
Interior of a TriMet bus in Portland, Oregon, with the majority of the seats marked by "Don't sit here" signs to enforce physical distancing among riders

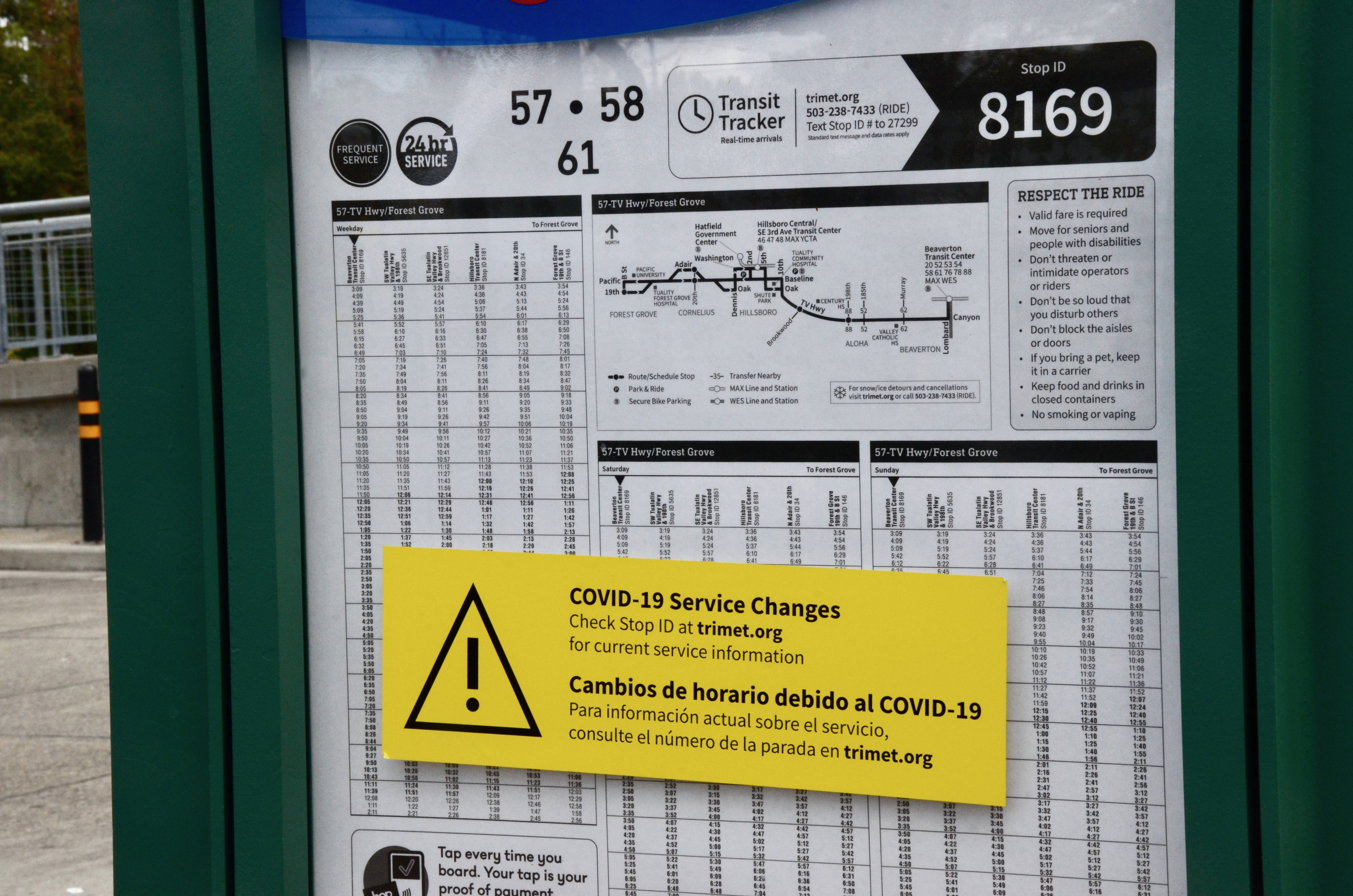
Schedule display at a bus stop with sticker alerting riders to temporary service reductions for COVID-19

According to Government Technology, "Steep declines in ridership during the crisis have pushed public transit systems across the U.S. into deep financial distress." Kim Hart of Axios wrote, "Public transit systems across the country are experiencing a painful trifecta: Ridership has collapsed, funding streams are squeezed, and mass transit won't bounce back from the pandemic nearly as fast as other modes of transportation."

In Detroit, DDOT bus services were cancelled after drivers refused to work.

The Verge reported an 18.65 percent ridership decline on the New York City Subway system for March 11 compared to one year prior. New York City Bus ridership decreased 15 percent, Long Island Rail Road ridership decreased 31 percent, and Metro-North Railroad ridership decreased 48 percent. Sound Transit, operating in the Seattle metropolitan area, saw a 25 percent decrease in ridership in February compared to January, and the city's ferry ridership saw a 15 percent decline on March 9 compared to one week prior. These declines became much more pronounced in late March and April, as widespread closures of schools and businesses and 'shelter-in-place' orders began to be implemented. USA Today reported in mid-April that demand for transit service was down by an average of 75 percent nationwide, with figures of 85 percent in San Francisco and 60 percent in Philadelphia. Ridership on the Washington Metro was down 95 percent in late April.

On April 7, SEPTA mandated that Philadelphia transit users wear face masks starting on April 9. On April 13, the agency said the rule would not be enforced. On June 8, SEPTA again mandated that riders wear face masks.

In order to prevent the spread of the virus on board buses and rail vehicles, some transit agencies have implemented temporary limits on the number of passengers allowed on a vehicle and others have begun to require riders to wear face masks. To reduce contact between drivers and passengers, several agencies have implemented rear-door-only boarding and temporarily suspended the collection of fares, examples including Seattle, New York City buses, and Denver.

In January 2021, the U.S. federal government issued a nationwide requirement for face masks to be worn on board all public transit vehicles and at "transportation hubs". In August 2021, the requirement was extended to mid-January 2022, and in early December it was further extended to March 18, 2022, and then to May 3. However, the nationwide mandate abruptly ended about two weeks before that date, on April 17, 2022, when a federal judge in Florida struck it down, saying the TSA and CDC had exceeded their authority in imposing it. However, individual transit agencies and airlines were still permitted to retain their own face mask requirements.

==== California ====
In California, Carson officials asked the Metro transit system to cease bus services in Los Angeles County.

The San Diego Metropolitan Transit System (MTS) reduced its bus and Trolley (light rail) services following ridership decreases.

Bay Area Rapid Transit ridership plummeted by 90 percent prompting reduced service hours, cut short turns on lines, and longer train lengths to accommodate social distancing. Frequencies were reduced to half an hour per line.

Most services were shut down in San Francisco.

==== New York ====
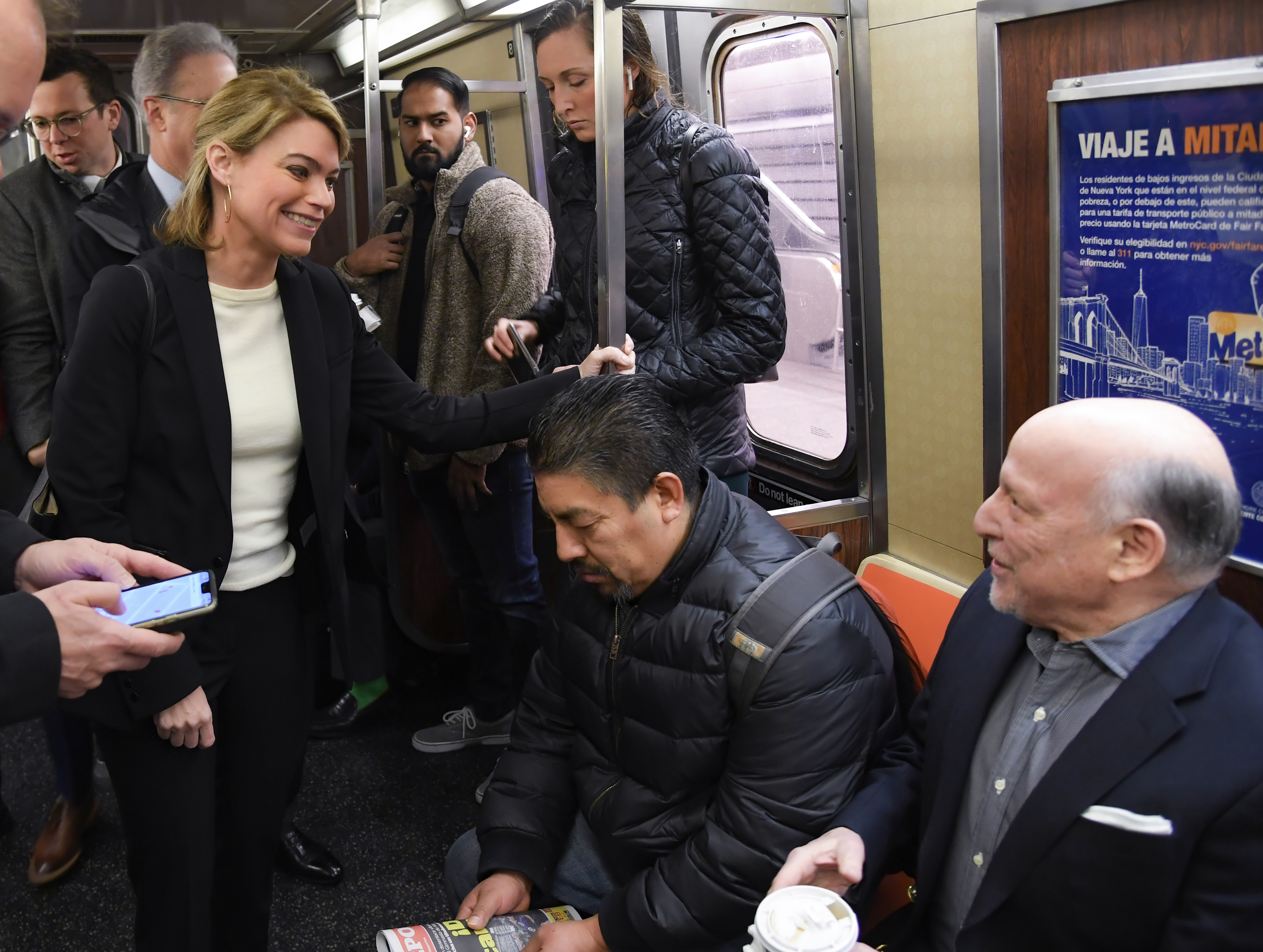
Interim New York City Transit President Sarah Feinberg rides the subway, March 9

Beginning March 25, service on buses and subways was reduced due to decreased ridership during the first wave of the COVID-19 pandemic in New York City. In April 2020, four City Council members requested that subway service be temporarily suspended due to the spread of COVID-19 in the subway system. In late March, NYCTA Interim President Sarah Feinberg stated that a shutdown "feels misguided to me" and was "not on the table". Feinberg also spoke in favor of hazard pay for front-line workers. The following month, Feinberg called the MTA "the most aggressive transit agency in the country in acting quickly and decisively to protect our workforce." Starting in May 2020, stations were closed overnight for cleaning; the overnight closures would be a temporary measure that would be suspended once the pandemic was over.

By April 22, 2020, COVID-19 had killed 83 agency employees; the agency announced that their families would be eligible for $500,000 in death benefits. By May 1, 98 transit workers had died.

==== Oregon ====
Oregon's largest transit agency, TriMet, started to require facial coverings for both passengers and operators. Oregon has gone so far as to allow people to order facial coverings. Oregon's governor Kate Brown issued an executive order 20–12, ruling on public transit and requirements for safe travel in Oregon. With these requirements, TriMet was required to clean vehicles every four hours, and recommended to sanitize high-touch surfaces, provide facial coverings and sanitizer, if possible. There were many exceptions to the rule that applied to people with disabilities and other health issues, and those concerned about profiling because of wearing a mask. Other public transit operators in Oregon, such as Amtrak, reduced services as well. In January 2021, the state's requirement for face coverings was superseded by a nationwide such requirement issued by the federal government, which remained in effect until April 2022.

== Oceania ==
=== Australia ===
==== New South Wales ====
In order to observe physical distancing and to limit the spread of COVID-19, green dots were placed throughout the public transport network to guide commuters on where to stand and sit. Transport for NSW recommended that commuters wear face masks on public transport.

On 7 July 2020, NSW TrainLink temporarily suspended services between NSW and Victoria due to border restrictions implemented by New South Wales.

Based on data provided by Moovit, public transport ridership in NSW decreased by 75 percent April 2020.

==== Victoria ====
The Victorian government made wearing face masks on public transport mandatory.
