= Daimler Hire =

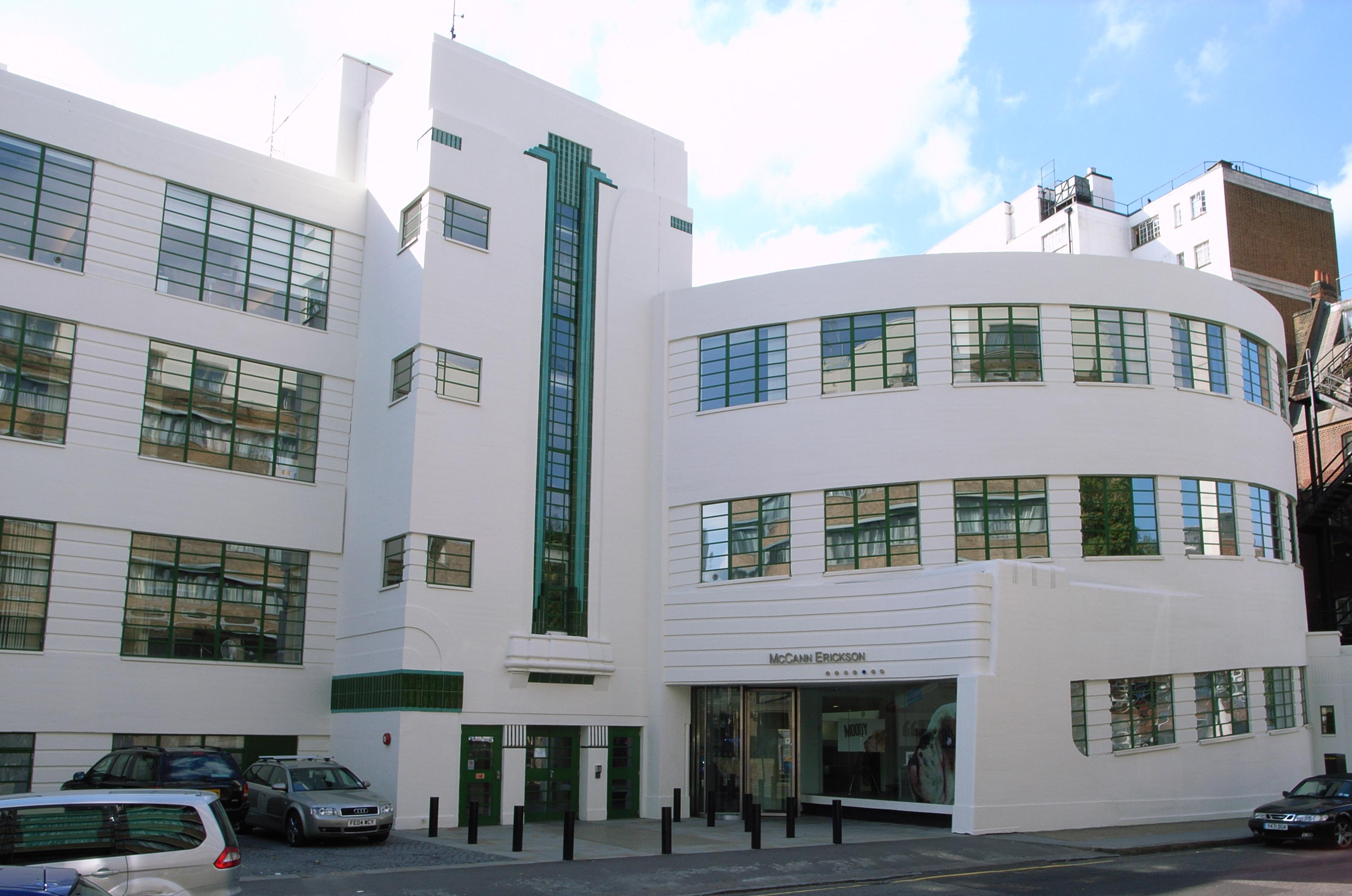
Daimler Hire's former garage in Bloomsbury, London, now offices of Thought Machine

Daimler Hire Limited provided a luxury chauffeur-driven Daimler limousine-hire-service from Knightsbridge in London. Incorporated in 1919 to take over the operations of Daimler's hire department, Daimler Hire was a subsidiary of Daimler Company, itself a subsidiary of the Birmingham Small Arms Company (BSA). The company's services later included self-drive hire cars, which continued to the end of the company's existence. Aviation services introduced in 1919 and motor yacht rental services introduced in 1922 were sold in 1924.

Majority shareholding in Daimler Hire was sold to Thomas Tilling in 1930; in 1949 the Daimler Company sold its remaining shares to the same company. In the 1950s, Humber Pullman and Humber Super Snipe limousines were added to its fleet. In 1958, the company was sold to Hertz, an American car rental company, as a base to enter the British market. Daimler Hire was discontinued in 1976.

== Origin ==
Formally inaugurated in December 1907, Daimler's hire department began when half a dozen of the Coventry workforce were ”put through a thorough course of tuition on the motor and driving” so that carriages could be “let out on hire with a competent driver for a period not exceeding three months at a charge of £5 per week – this amount, less driver’s wages to be refunded in the event of purchase”. The London operation began as a reserve pool of cars and staff of drivers to provide support for the mews at Buckingham Palace and other Daimler owners when their cars need servicing. Its services soon extended to prosperous London residents who did not wish to have the trouble of keeping their own car and driver. Visitors toured Europe in their Daimler Hire limousines with chauffeur-guide. Daimler viewed it as “a demonstration to all the world of the utility comfort and reliability of the Daimler car”.

BY APPOINTMENT

DAIMLER HIRE LIMITED

By road or air to anywhere

You can hire a luxurious six-seater Daimler Car for 150 miles with a time limit of 15 hours for 8 guineas. Excess mileage 6d per mile.

Special Theatre or Evening Service 20 miles between 6 p.m. and 12 midnight for 35s.
Write or 'phone for full Hire Tariff.

TO PARIS BY AIR
The Daimler Airway takes you to Paris in 125 minutes. Regular daily service
For time and fares see daily press.

Taxi Planes will take you to anywhere in Europe.
Apply to any Travel Agent, or at

243, KNIGHTSBRIDGE, S.W.7
Telephone No. : Kensington 2010

PARIS : 25, Rue Royale;
Tele. Elysée 26-71

— text from Official Theatre Guide and Programme for the week June 26th to July 1st 1922

Daimler Hire was formed in 1919 to perform the functions of the hire department. 250 new Daimler limousines were added to the fleet In that year. London operations were based at 243 Knightsbridge, SW7 — the former Prince's Skating Club — and 68 Brompton Road, SW3. During the 1919 rail strike they ran shuttle services between London and Birmingham and London and Manchester with "high-powered limousines and landaulettes" "for business trips and journeys of importance in the national emergency". In 1923, George V granted a Royal Warrant to Daimler Hire.

Daimler Hire delivered newsprint throughout the country during the 1926 United Kingdom general strike.

== Aviation ==
From 1919 its services were extended to Daimler Air Hire, a luxury aircraft-hire or charter service to which was soon added a scheduled airline, Daimler Airway, an airway service to France as a natural extension to the facilities for comfortable private transport already afforded by the company through its unique fleet of luxury touring cars.

Daimler Airway, in 1924, became the major constituent of the new national air carrier, Imperial Airways when Daimler Hire’s managing director, Frank Searle and manager George E. Woods Humphery, took the same positions with Imperial Airways.

== Car radio receivers ==
In March 1923 a dozen or so radio-equipped cars were put in service.

== Motor yachting ==
In the summer of 1922 Daimler Hire offered a new service to those who now found running a yacht of their own too expensive, The first vessel was the Dame Lora which first departed on Wednesday 11 August down Southampton Water for a cruise in the Solent. It was intended to be the first of a fleet of new yachts, 80 feet long with a beam of thirteen feet and a gross tonnage of 64 tons, powered by the 105 hp Daimler engine used in wartime tanks. There were two single and two double cabins, Marconiphones were provided for "listening in"and a gramophone to supply music for dancing. The yachts were to be constructed so that they would be able to take parties to the south of France for the winter through the French canals. The yacht hire service was sold in 1924.

== Coronation ==
Daimler Hire provided 150 Daimler Straight Eights to carry foreign dignitaries attending the coronation of King George VI in 1937. Over a thousand privately owned Daimlers arranged by Daimler Hire were also used in connection with the coronation. (Note: Both sources mention the chartering of 150 Daimlers and a thousand Daimlers involved with the Coronation celebration, but neither source mentions Daimler Hire specifically.)

== Ownership ==
Originally a wholly owned subsidiary of Daimler Company, in 1930 75% of Daimler Hire's ordinary shares were sold to Thomas Tilling which operated a similar London private-hire-car business. They purchased the balance of the capital from Daimler in 1949.

In early 1958, Daimler Hire was bought by Hertz as its entry into the British car hire market. By the time of the purchase, the company's chauffeurs had covered 2.3 million miles a year, while their self-drive customers drove another 7.5 million.

Daimler Hire Limited retained its separate trading identity until 1976.

== Notes ==
Footnotes

Citations
