= Messaging spam =

Messaging spam, sometimes called SPIM, is a type of spam targeting users of instant messaging (IM) services, SMS, or private messages within websites.

== Instant messaging applications ==
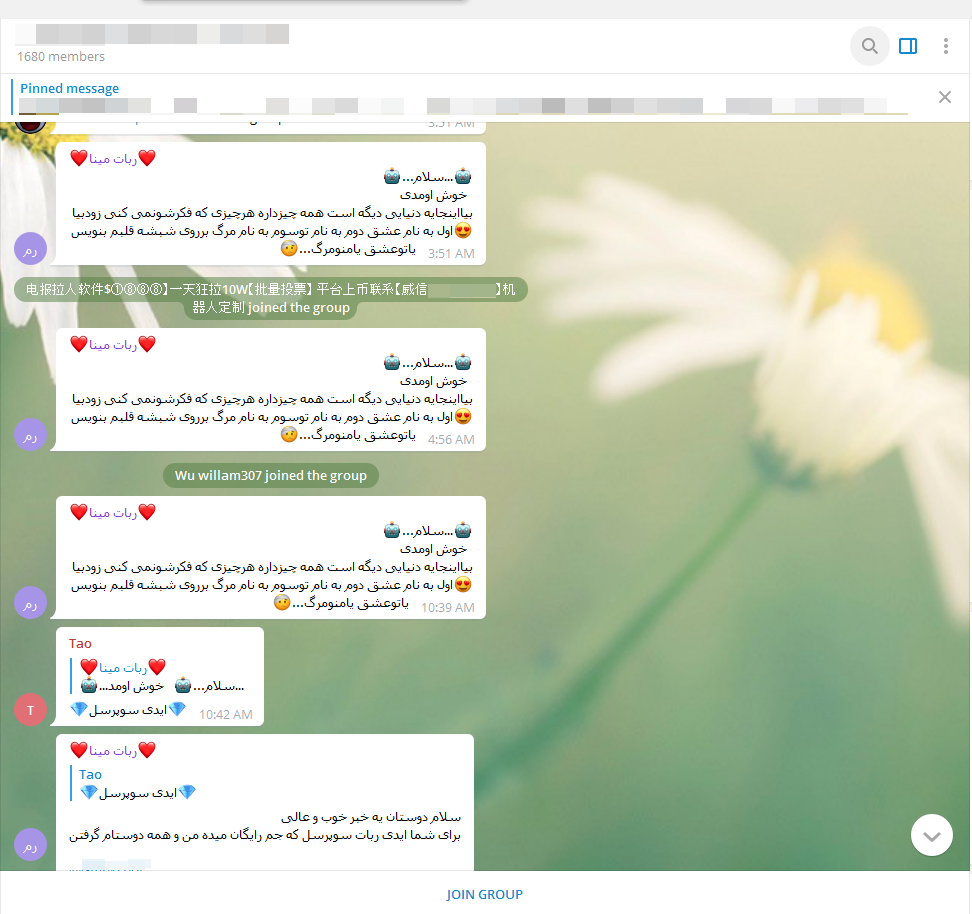
Messaging spam on Telegram.

Instant messaging systems, such as Telegram, WhatsApp, Twitter Direct Messaging, Kik, Skype and Snapchat are all targets for spammers. Many IM services are publicly linked to social media platforms, which may include information on the user such as age, sex, location and interests. Advertisers and scammers can gather this information, sign on to the service, and send unsolicited messages which could contain scam links, pornographic material, malware or ransomware. With most services users can report and block spam accounts, or set privacy settings so only contacts can contact them.

== Countermeasures ==
- Many users choose to receive IMs only from people already on their contact list.
- In corporate settings, spam over IM is blocked by IM spam blockers like those from Actiance, ScanSafe, and Symantec.
- IM providers like Kik have a "report user" button, which sends a chatlog to the IM administrators who can then take action.

== Pornographic IM spambots ==
Spam-bots often sign on to popular messaging services like Kik or Skype to spread pornographic images. Often if the user responds they receive a URL inviting them to a private livestream that will ask them to enter credit card details for "age verification".

These bots target random usernames; this often results in minors receiving unsolicited pornographic images.

== On Windows NT-based systems ==
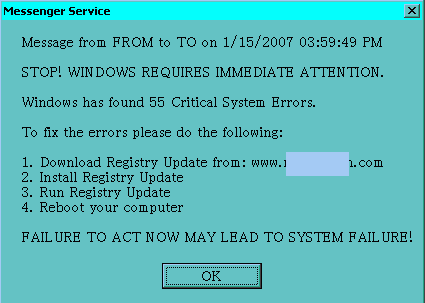
Example of Messenger Service spam from 2007.

In 2002, a number of spammers began abusing the Windows Messenger service, a function of Windows designed to allow administrators to send alerts to users' workstations (not to be confused with Windows Messenger or Windows Live Messenger, a free instant messaging application) in Microsoft's Windows NT-based operating systems. Messenger Service spam appears as normal dialog boxes containing the spammer's message. These messages are easily blocked by firewalls configured to block packets to the NetBIOS ports 135-139 and 445 as well as unsolicited UDP packets to ports above 1024. Additionally, Windows XP Service Pack 2 disables the Messenger Service by default.

Messenger Service spammers frequently send messages to vulnerable Windows machines with a URL. The message promises the user to eradicate spam messages sent via the Messenger Service. The URL leads to a website where, for a fee, users are told how to disable the Messenger service. Though the Messenger is easily disabled for free by the user, this works because it creates a perceived need and then offers an immediate solution.

== In opinion-based recommender systems ==
In an opinion based recommender system, an important concern is how to evaluate the user-generated reviews on the items. One of the purposes of this evaluation is to identify malicious or spam reviews. Poorly written reviews are considered helpless to the recommender system. However, even if a review is well generated, they can still be harmful to the recommender system by their biased prejudice to form an actual advertisement or slander towards a target item.

Current approach of spam detection methods includes analyzing the spam text and identifying the spam reviewers by their reviews and activities. For the first kind, a machine learning application on review text has been developed. For the second kind, researchers use network motif analysis technique to identify spam reviewers by their recurring reviewing activity.
