= Employee resource group =

Special groups of employees

Employee resource groups (also known as ERGs, affinity groups, business network groups, or business resource groups) are groups of employees who join in their workplace based on shared characteristics or life experiences. ERGs are generally based on providing support, enhancing career development, and contributing to personal development in the work environment. In the past, ERGs have traditionally been focused on personality traits or characteristics for underrepresented groups, for example women, sexual orientation, gender, etc. With the resurgence of ERGs in the workplace, ERGs are expanding to "interest-based" groups gathered around particular activities. Some of these include job responsibility, environmental advocacy, community service and volunteerism, and workplace wellness. Further, as an emerging facet of human resources and employee engagement in the business world, the existence of ERGs is important for reference and understanding in the world of business. Exploring the topic of employee resource groups can provide insightful information for business employees and young professionals seeking to understand a new business.

== History ==
For the past 30 years, ERGs have helped a diverse range of groups obtain a voice within large corporations. They began as race-based employee forums that were created in response to racial tension in the 1960s. ERGs got their start when Joseph Wilson, the CEO of the Xerox Corporation took action after the 1964 Rochester race riot. He and his black employees formed the first caucus group in order to address the issue of discrimination and to help create a fair corporate environment. Xerox launched the National Black Employees Caucus in 1970 and a decade later followed with the formation of the Black Women's Leadership Council (BWLC).

Hewlett-Packard (HP) employees formed Gay and Lesbian Employee Network (GLEN) in 1978. Gay and lesbian inclusion at HP was hotly debated for decades thereafter. Archived company emails from 1993 include homophobic language and LGBT employees describing harassment and violence at HP. Another early example was US West, which authorized a support group for gay and lesbian employees in 1989.

Early in their history, these affinity groups were a risky and political tactic of advocating for equal pay and equal opportunity. It was common for early members to feel nervous about speaking up to management about their minority status for fear of seeming like a troublemaker or having an individualistic mind-set. While original ERGs were often seen as threatening by managers, today these groups are often initiated by administrators and are a common tool for managing diversity. As of 2007 ninety percent of Fortune 500 companies have ERGs.

== Types ==
There are numerous types of ERGs existing at different companies. Here are some of the most popular:

- People with disabilities
- Veterans
- Cultural diversity
- Health/Fitness
- LGBT employees
- Women in the workforce
- Faith/Belief
- Generational
- Working parents
- Single parents

== Common practices ==
=== Goal-oriented events ===
Successful ERGs will combine business and employee goals to provide maximum benefit. Some general common practices of these include: providing cultural support and diversity insight in company products, missions, or methods; developing products and branding for diverse target markets; and building company reputation through active community involvement. In addition, ERGs often provide resources for professional development, fostering a learning environment for better company contributions. Further, many ERGs are active in employee recruitment and engagement, attracting employees who identify with the company from the very start. Talent acquisition, communication with executives, culture awareness and change, and development are at the core of ERG functioning.

Events hosted by ERGs range from in-person networking days to shared spaces for information sharing on company networks. ERG members may personally benefit from leadership and diversity training, mentoring, professional development, and skills workshops uniquely tailored to group goals. On the company scale, ERG members may provide diverse perspectives on marketing techniques, participate in product development evaluations, and communicate with executives through advisory panels. Outside the company, many ERG members advocate for larger cultural and social goals, whether for LGBT community support, multicultural rights, workplace equality, or political activism. In addition, community service has been noted as a significant part of ERG activity; this enhances company reputation while fulfilling personal goals of the employees. Though there aren't prescribed actions for ERGs to take, most ERGs are responsible for their own goals, leadership structure, and functioning. The actions are driven by the interests and characteristics of the group members, and are most successful when they are supported by executives in the company.

=== Role of technology ===
With the surge of computer mediated communication, ERGs have embraced social media and online communication to connect previously disconnected members. Of most popular use are internal social networks, external social networking like Facebook or Twitter, blogs, internal collaboration and blogging sites, webinars, podcasts, and wikis. These tools facilitate planning events and engaging in constant communication with group members. With lack of physical presence, collaboration is still possible. The most successful ERGs utilize multiple forms of social media to address the needs of all group members and ensure awareness of group events.

=== Structure and alignment ===
Though ERGs may be operated in different ways, groups usually align with some aspect of the business. Frequent alignment occurs with diversity or business and talent initiatives, where ERGs are utilized to further business objectives and maximize employee engagement and contribution. While some ERGs may have a larger percentage of the employee population involved, the average rate of membership is 7.9% of employees. Participation is usually driven by interest in sub-groups, the mission of the ERG, or the rewards and incentives for participation.

ERG councils are one form of leadership within companies to collaborate among groups; this is growing in large businesses globally. Additionally, company leaders and senior executives play a role in supporting ERG functioning, and offer recognition and acknowledgement of ERG leaders as an incentive for participation. When ERG participation is rewarded in some way, whether through intrinsically motivated accountability standards or external benefits, engagement grows. In terms of accountability, peer or leadership review, business sponsorship, and elected membership serve as motivating factors. Traditional rewards for participation include personal development or advancement opportunity, cash bonus, or non-financial rewards. Not all ERGs give tangible rewards, as participation and engagement are desirable from the start.

== Companies with ERGs ==
Almost 90% of Fortune 500 companies report having ERGs in 2011. Because of this rising popularity, many companies have adopted practices and have begun financially supporting resource groups. See the list below for a small sample of some of the companies with ERGs that have been analyzed in the relevant ERG research.

- Allstate
- American Airlines, Inc.
- American International Group
- Anheuser-Busch
- AOL, LLC
- Airbus
- AT&T
- The Boeing Company
- Boston Scientific Corporation
- BAE Systems
- BASF
- Channel 4 Television Corporation
- Cisco Systems
- Con Edison
- Dell Inc.
- DIRECTV
- Dominion Energy
- Southern California Edison
- F5 Networks
- Ford Motor Company
- Gap Inc.
- Garmin International, Inc.
- General Motors
- Henry Schein
- Hewlett Packard Enterprise
- Highmark Health
- HSBC
- IBM
- Johnson Controls
- Kellogg Company
- MasterCard Worldwide
- Medtronic
- McDonald's USA
- McGraw-Hill Company
- Microsoft
- Nestlé
- Raytheon
- Starbucks Coffee Company
- T-Mobile
- The New York Times Company
- Unilever
- Union Pacific Railroad
- United Airlines
- Verizon
- Visa Inc.
- The Walt Disney Company
- Workhuman

=== Benefits to members ===
Some of the major benefits that ERGs bring to their members are an opportunity to more casually work with (and network with) others outside of one's current department or workgroups, a sense of belonging (besides to the company and one's department) and support. ERGs establish a support group of people who share a common stories or experiences. These groups also provide fellowship and friendship for its members. Further, ERGs can have direct effects on the corporate culture by allowing the members of the ERGs and other employees to feel comfortable with differences within their organization.

Another benefit of ERGs is the professional development that they foster. This professional development often comes in the form of skill-building (and resume building) not available in one's current role, mentoring and workshops. ERGs also provide an effective way for employees to network with other employees who share the same experiences, and through some of their company wide events, members can have the opportunity to meet other employees or management who are not in the ERG but are supportive of the cause . Belonging to an ERG also provides ERG group members access to the ERG's executive sponsor(s) and other company leaders not otherwise available to that employee otherwise.

Further, ERGs have the potential to create more equality for their members. ERGs promote diversity by ensuring that all members of an organization or business have the same opportunities in having a voice in the company, access to the same information that can help their employment success, helpful networks with other employees, the opportunity to contribute ideas, and the opportunity to advance within the company. Further, in the spirit of equality, one of the goals of ERGs is to raise awareness for these different groups of people. This awareness benefits the members of the ERGs and other employees within the company to promote a productive and inclusive work environment.

=== Benefits to the organization ===
Many of the advantages of ERGs to the organization or company are tied to the aforementioned personal benefits because when the members of ERGs are benefiting, it will lead to employee satisfaction, which is productive for the company. Further, ERGs are often founded on the premise of contributing to the success of the company. Since ERGs typically have to be approved by the organization itself, the ERGs will claim to support some of the same goals as the company, which can include promoting diversity and employee satisfaction. ERGs can foster employee satisfaction because employees feel better about going to work when they know that their company has a legitimate interest in issues that are meaningful to their personal life. It is because of this increased employee satisfaction that companies with affinity groups are often rated some of the best places to work.

Another benefit that comes with ERG's within a company is encouraging the inclusivity of all its employees. Diversity is important in contributing to the overall wellbeing of a workplace, and employees can find support within ERG's that align with their backgrounds and experiences. ERG's act as a cultural/experiential support groups for employees that require the insight and assistance of someone else in the company in the same ERG. Through this, employees have multiple outlets of support within a company apart from the traditional executive team that might not take into account the unique interests and needs of an employee.

=== Bringing about broad change ===
Employee resource groups have the potential to bring about broad change. They serve as an organized and established platform that employees can utilize to promote change. These changes occur in the form of policy changes, cultural changes, and improved relationships between the employees and employers. ERGs can have effects beyond those for the employer and employee, however, and instead they can promote employee activism outside of the workplace and they focus on causes of a larger societal scope. For instance, many ERGs provided aid Hurricane Katrina victims, which leads to the argument that ERGs are expanding to also affect the world community.

== Disadvantages ==
=== To employees ===
There are multiple disadvantages to employees in ERGs. Sometimes other employees resist the changing culture of the American workforce and the diversity that ERGs promote. People with these views are often opposed to change and the uncertainty that follows. This discrepancy between the ideals of the ERG and the ideals of other employees has the potential to cause rifts. Additionally, our society emphasizes that an employer should meet all of an employee's needs, and ERGs are said to further this notion. Some believe that this thinking is dangerous if taken too far because it could make an employee too dependent on their employer. If ERGs are leading activists to make their lives revolve even more around work, such negative implications could arise.

Some also believe that it is dangerous for an ERG member to be strongly invested in the possibility of change provided by their ERG. By becoming so invested in an ERG, there is a greater probability that that member may lose sight of the larger change that they want to see in society by instead focusing too much on the prospect of change in their specific company. Along the same lines, others believe that radical members of ERGs have to find a careful balance between supporting their cause and supporting their workplace. Since radical advocates for a cause tend to feel deeply about the issues, they can feel pressure from their advocacy groups to yield more influence in their ERG, while their ERG needs them to adopt a more conservative approach in order to contribute to and deal with the business.

=== To the organization ===
ERGs have the potential to create strained relationships between members of the ERG and upper management. Because these management personnel have the ability to affect promised jobs and bonuses, there are situations that have the potential to arise in which ERG participation leads to discrimination. To combat this potential disadvantage to ERGs, some believe it is necessary for them to focus on gaining trust, joint learning with management, and forming alliances in order to promote change.

=== Competition among ERGs ===
Within many organizations the various ERGs compete for funds and impact on the company, and this competition can lead to various negative effects of ERGs. It is found that ERGs would be more influential if they supported one another in the promotion of diversity within the workplace, but this empathy often does not happen because of the inherent difficulties that it poses.

There are numerous reasons for these disparities. One reason is that ERGs come with historical social tensions that widen the gap between groups. For instance, African American groups can fear that white women groups will take the company's concentration off of diversity and instead turn it to work/life balance. Members often want their ERG to seem unique to capture the attention of leaders in the organization, which makes supporting other ERGs more difficult. It is apparent that companies are less likely to make too many changes, so the more ERGs, the less true impact that each can have.

If ERGs cooperated with one another, they would exemplify an ideal that they promote, which is to effectively and respectfully work in a diverse workplace. Their cooperation would be an excellent example of this principle, even though it would take effort to promote. Human Resource departments at some companies are focusing on bringing these ERGs together through diversity councils.
