= Onet.pl =

Polish web portal

- Website type: Web portal
- Founded: June 2, 1996; 30 years ago
- Owner: Ringier Axel Springer Polska
- Creator: Oddział Internet
- Website: onet.pl
- Commercial: yes

Onet.pl is the largest Polish-language web portal and online news platform. According to Digital News Report, it is the largest online news source in the country, reaching 42% Internet users every week. It is also one of the most-quoted news media in Poland.

== History ==
It was founded in 1996 by Optimus company and is owned by the Kraków-based Grupa Onet.pl S.A. According to Alexa rankings, as of October 2017, it was the 45th most popular website worldwide and the 3rd most popular site in Poland. As of December 2016, it is the 6th most visited website in Poland, 311th in the UK, and 375th worldwide.

== Ownership ==
Ringier Axel Springer Media AG holds the majority of Onet since 2012.

== Services ==
Among its services is a Polish online encyclopedia, the WIEM Encyklopedia. It also has a licence for Rebtel service (marketed in Poland as OnetRebtel) and Skype service (marketed in Poland as OnetSkype). Its other services include email, web hosting, Usenet access, web forums and online chats.

Onet launched a clone of CNN iReport called Cynk. This citizen journalism project received between 20 and 30 news items a day, according to Michał Bonarowski, Onet's chief editor of publishing.

Onet had hosted over 800,000 active blogs but in 2018, due to popularity of social media, the service was closed.
