= Appear Here =

Online marketplace for retail space

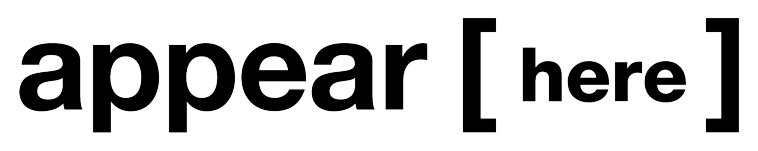
- Industry: Tech
- Founded: 2014; 12 years ago London, United Kingdom
- Founder: Ross Bailey
- Headquarters: London
- Areas served: Worldwide
- Key people: Gastón Tourn (CMO); Dan Horner (CSO); James Parker (CFO)
- Services: Flexible retail space
- Website: appearhere.co.uk

Appear Here is an online marketplace for retail space. Since the company was founded in 2014, it has facilitated the opening of over 10,000 stores in the UK, US, and France.

== History ==
In the summer of 2012, Ross Bailey and a friend decided to create a brand called Rock and Rule to celebrate the Queen's Diamond Jubilee. They opened a pop up shop on Marshall Street, Soho to launch it. What surprised Bailey was the number of people asking him how he got hold of the shop. When Rock and Rule closed, Bailey took his share of the profit and put it into launching Appear Here.

Currently, Appear Here lists over 10,000 short-term spaces worldwide, with prime retail properties in global cities including, London, Manchester, New York City and Paris. Over 200,000 brands have signed up to the platform, including Apple, Supreme, Nike, Netflix, Chanel and Tommy Hilfiger.

=== Expansion ===
In November 2013, Appear Here closed a £1 million funding round, securing backing from Howzat Partners (backers of Trivago), MMC Ventures (backers of AlexandAlexa) and Forward Investment Partners (existing investors and backers of uSwitch and Hailo). Other participants in this round include Meyer Bergman, Playfair Capital and Ballpark Ventures, as well as Marc Hazan (of Spotify) and Miroma Ventures (investors in Pinterest).

In November 2014, Appear Here raised a further £5 million from Balderton Capital to fund its international expansion. In 2016, Appear Here launched in its first international city, Paris. In April 2017, Appear Here expanded to the US, launching in New York.

In May 2017, Appear Here raised $12 million in Series B funding. Leading the round was Octopus Ventures, with participation from Simon Venture Group, and existing investors Balderton Capital, MMC, Meyer Bergman and Playfair Capital.

== Partnerships ==
=== Transport for London, April 2014 ===
Transport for London appointed Appear Here to introduce pop up shops across its retail estate, including key underground stations such as, Piccadilly Circus tube station, Baker Street, Old Street Station, St Paul's tube station and Leicester Square. As part of this new partnership, Appear Here took an active role in the curation of Old Street Station transforming it into a new retail destination dedicated to pop-up retail. The station was given a revamp and eight retail spaces within were white-boxed and listed on Appear Here's marketplace. In 2015, Appear Here was awarded Property Week's Placemaking award for Old Street Station. . Since launch, over 500 brands have appeared in the station, including Adidas, Calvin Klein, Jamie Oliver and streetwear concept store Ejder which won Best Pop Up Shop at the Mapic Awards 2016. In 2017, Netflix took over the entire station for the launch of Black Mirror Season 4.

=== Topshop, In-Residence, September 2015 ===
Appear Here partnered with Topshop in 2015 to list concession space in their flagship store, 214 Oxford Street. This was the first time that concession space within the store was made available to be booked online. The spaces include market stalls, residence walls, retail and event spaces.

Since launch, over 100 brands have appeared in Topshop through Appear Here, including Spotify and independent jewellery brand Littlesmith who went from one Saturday stall in Spitalfields to a permanent residence across Topshop's key stores.

=== Hammerson, Up Market, May 2017 ===
Hammerson and Appear Here teamed up to launch Up Market, an initiative to give emerging small businesses and artisan brands the chance to access major malls and prime retail destinations. Curated by Appear Here, Up Market showcases a rotating collection of independent food, fashion and lifestyle brands in bespoke, collapsible market stalls.

As part of a three-year agreement, Up Market has already appeared in six of Hammerson's major shopping centres, opening 37 market stalls across Birmingham's Bullring, Brent Cross (London), One New Change (London), Cabot Circus (Bristol) and Victoria Quarter (Leeds).

=== Simon Property Group, The Edit, November 2017 ===
Simon Property Group exclusively partnered with Appear Here to create a "new shopping experience" inside one of the country's largest malls – Roosevelt Field.

=== Unicef Next Generation, Imad's Syrian Kitchen, March 2017 ===
Appear Here partnered with Unicef Next Generation to help Imad Alarnab, a Syrian chef and refugee, launch a restaurant in London.

=== Bode Pop Up, Art Basel Miami Beach, March 2019 ===
During Art Basel Miami Beach, Appear Here partnered with menswear designer Bode to launch a store at 2621 Northwest Second Avenue. The shop sold pieces from Bode's fall collection and showcased furniture from Green River Project.
