= Suranga Chandratillake =

Sri Lankan businessman (born 1977)

Suranga Chandratillake සුරංග චන්ද්‍රතිලක
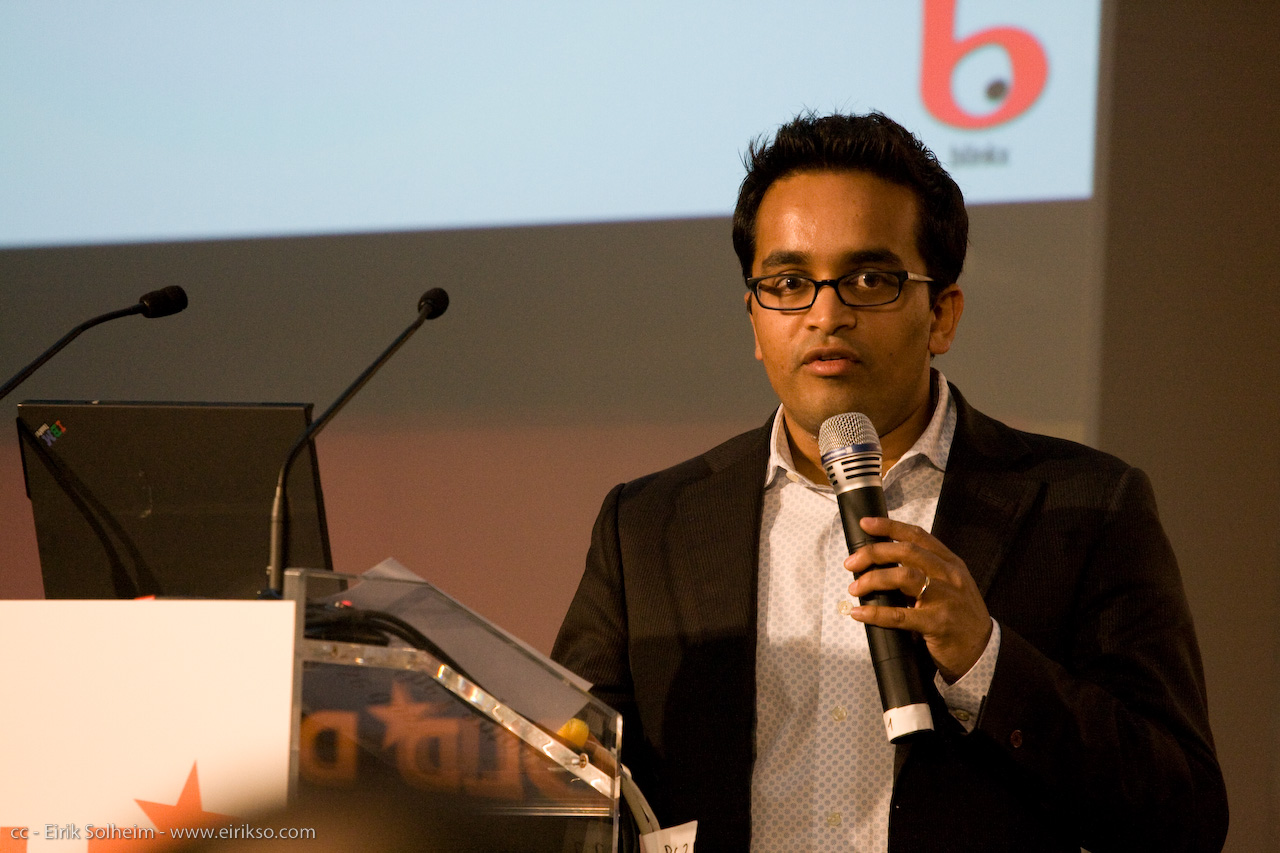
- Born: 1977 (age 48–49); Kandy, Sri Lanka
- Education: King's College, Cambridge
- Occupations: Founder and CEO of blinkx.com

Suranga Chandratillake OBE FREng (born October 1977 in Kandy, Sri Lanka) is the founder and former CEO of blinkx, the San Francisco-based video search and advertising company which later became RhythmOne. After eight years as CEO and taking blinkx public, Chandratillake became the company's Chief Strategy Officer and, in 2014, returned to Europe to join the UK-based venture capital firm, Balderton Capital, as a General Partner.

== Career ==
Prior to founding blinkx, Chandratillake held a variety of roles in technology, sales and marketing at Morgan Stanley, netdecisions and anondesign.

Chandratillake holds an MA in Computer Science from King's College, Cambridge; specializing in distributed processing architectures, he received a double first. While at Cambridge, he was the first web editor of the University's student newspaper, Varsity. Soon after graduating, Chandratillake joined Autonomy Corporation as lead R&D engineer on the company's core data analysis engine.

Chandratillake moved to California as Autonomy's Chief Technology Officer to set up an office in Silicon Valley, where he was responsible for growing the company's research and development division in the United States. Autonomy set up blinkx as a standalone business in 2005, with Chandratillake as CEO. The spinout followed an internal project that Chandratillake set up to develop software that would index and find information at a desktop level. Chandratillake took blinkx public on the London Stock Exchange on May 22, 2007.

Chandratillake has spoken at industry events including the Financial Times' Digital Media Conference, Cannes Lions International Advertising Festival and the Monaco Media Forum. Named a Young Global Leader Honoree in 2009 by the World Economic Forum, Chandratillake has also been recognized as a leader in Science and Innovation by The Observer's Future 500 list, and one of Digital Media Wire's "25 Executives to Watch in Digital Entertainment".

Chandratillake holds patents in the area of video discovery and online video advertising, is a Fellow of the Royal Academy of Engineering and was a 2012 recipient of the Academy's Silver Medal. He was appointed a member of the Council for Science and Technology, a body that advises the UK Prime Minister on strategic science and technology policy issues from 2017 to 2024.

In the 2018 New Year Honours, Chandratillake was awarded an OBE for services to engineering and technology.
