= Tictail =

Former social shopping website

Tictail AB
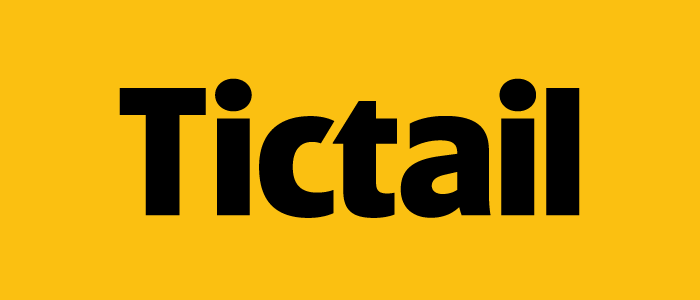
- Company type: Private
- Website type: Online Marketplace
- Available in: English, French, German, Spanish, Swedish
- Founded: 2012; 14 years ago
- Headquarters: Stockholm, Sweden
- Area served: Worldwide
- Founders: Kaj Drobin, Siavash Ghorbani, Birk Nilsson and Carl W Rivera (born Waldekranz)
- CEO: Carl W Rivera
- Industry: Internet
- Website: tictail.com
- Current status: Closed (as of 1 April 2019)
- Native clients on: iOS, Android

Tictail was a social shopping website for shoppers to discover emerging designers around the world. For brands, the platform was a DIY e-commerce tool focused on strong community integration, simplicity of use, and attractive, customizable design. With no need for coding or web-design experience, small business owners were given the tools to build global brands. For shoppers, Tictail was a destination to discover and shop home decor and fashion finds from a global community of emerging designers. Founded in Stockholm, Tictail currently has offices in both Sweden and New York where it opened its first brick-and-mortar store in January 2016. In November of 2018, Tictail was sold to Shopify. The acquisition by Shopify also resulted in Tictail’s brick-and-mortar store in New York City closing.

== History ==
Founded in 2011 in Stockholm by Carl W Rivera, Kaj Drobin, Siavash Ghorbani and Birk Nilsson, Tictail was dubbed ‘the Tumblr of e-commerce’ by Wired Magazine in 2012 when the company was listed as one of ‘Europe's 100 hottest start-ups’. Tictail is built as a DIY e-commerce platform empowering emerging designers to set up a virtual store in minutes. Tictail focuses on strong community integration, simplicity of use and stylized, customizable design.

In September 2013, Tictail opened up its platform, allowing third party individuals to develop Tictail apps that all users can purchase to add extra functionality to their store.

In September 2014, Tictail launched its first iPhone app, to offer shoppers the opportunity to browse the full catalog.

In May 2015, Tictail became the first e-commerce platform to allow brands to start an online store directly on their mobile phones. In October 2015, Tictail launched Tictail Talk a messaging platform for shoppers to communicate directly with brands, and vice versa.

In July 2015, Tictail launched its marketplace for shoppers to discover products from all brands connected to the platform.

In January 2016, Tictail opened Tictail Market its first permanent store in New York City on 90 Orchard street. Many of the brands sold at the physical location are sold exclusively in New York at Tictail Market.

In November 2018, Tictail was sold to Shopify.

Tictail closed its site 1 April 2019. Shopowners can still access the dashboard until 1 May 2019.

== Investments ==
To date, Tictail has raised $32M in funding, with an $8M Series A in Feb 2014 led by Thrive Capital in New York, and a $22M Series B in July 2015 led by Balderton Capital, Acton Capital, Creandum, and Thrive Capital. Tictail's advisory board includes Gustav Söderström, CPO of Spotify; Fredrik Nylander, CTO of Oscar Health and former COO of Tumblr; Sophia Bendz of Spotify; and Gustaf Alströmer, head of Product and Growth at Airbnb, and formerly Voxer

== Offices ==
Tictail opened its first office in 2012 in Stockholm. In 2014, the company opened its second office in New York City.

== Press ==
Since launch in May 2012, Tictail has received an award for Best Entrepreneurs of Sweden 2012 by IDG, and the Masters of Mobile award by Decoded Fashion. In 2015, Tictail CEO Waldekranz was also named as a "Forbes 30 under 30".
