= Sophia Genetics =

Health technology company

Sophia Genetics SA
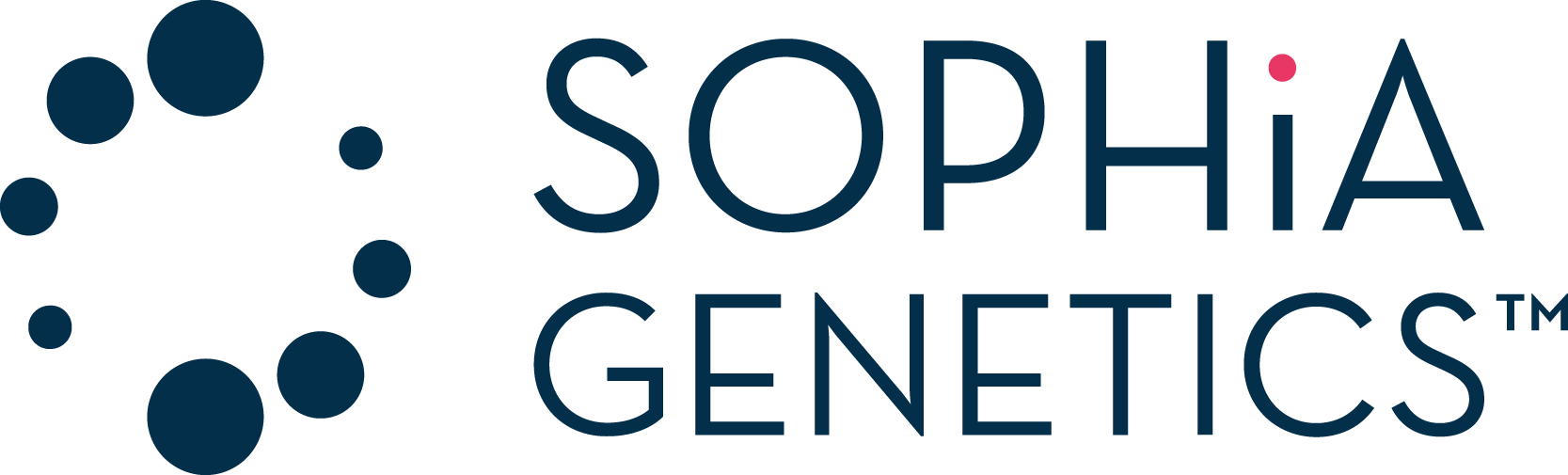
- Type: Public
- Traded as: Nasdaq: SOPH
- Industry: Software; Cloud computing
- Founded: 2011; 15 years ago
- Founders: Dr. Jurgi Camblong; Prof. Lars Steinmetz; Dr. Pierre Hutter
- Headquarters: Rolle, Switzerland; Boston, United States
- Key people: Ross Muken (CEO); Philippe Menu (CMO); Dr. Jurgi Camblong (Executive Chairman of the Board)
- Services: Sophia DDM Platform
- Number of employees: 400+
- Website: sophiagenetics.com

Sophia Genetics SA is a Swiss-founded data-driven medicine software company with headquarters in Rolle, Switzerland and Boston, Massachusetts, as well as offices in France. It provides genomic and radiomic, and multimodal analysis for hospitals, laboratories, and biopharma institutions.

== History ==
Sophia Genetics was co-founded by Jurgi Camblong, Pierre Hutter, and Lars Steinmetz in 2011 as a start-up at École Polytechnique Fédérale de Lausanne (EPFL). It began as a research tool for hospitals and federally regulated health care labs, and then expanded to biopharma institutions.

In 2014, the company introduced an analytical software platform, the Sophia DDM Platform (Data-Driven Medicine), which helps to interpret circulating tumor DNA and circulating tumour cells in blood, urine, cerebral spinal fluid and other liquid samples. The platform is used for oncology, hereditary cancers, metabolic disorders, pediatrics, cardiology, and for rare disease research.

In 2018, the company set up its first research and development center in France and made acquisition of a France-based molecular biology and genetic analytics software development company, Interactive Biosoftware. That same year, Sophia Genetics opened its U.S. headquarters in Boston, Massachusetts.

Prior to its initial public offering, Sophia Genetics raised approximately $250 million across several private funding rounds. The company closed a $13.75 million Series B round in 2014, led by Invoke Capital, Swisscom, and Endeavour Vision. This was followed by a $15 million Series C round in 2015, led by Belgian entrepreneur Marc Coucke. In September 2017, the company raised $30 million in a Series D round led by Balderton Capital. A $77 million Series E round followed in January 2019, led by Generation Investment Management. The company's largest private round, a $110 million Series F, closed in October 2020, led by aMoon and Hitachi Ventures, bringing its total funding raised since founding to approximately $250 million.

In August 2020, the company released a data analysis solution that was focused on predicting the disease evolution of the SARS-CoV-2 virus. Also in 2022, the firm began development of a new method for detecting extrachromosomal DNA through collaboration with startup firm Boundless Bio.

In July 2021, Sophia Genetics went public with an IPO backed by J.P. Morgan, Morgan Stanley, and Credit Suisse.

== Technology ==
In 2014, Sophia Genetics introduced an analytical software platform, the Sophia DDM Platform (Data-Driven Medicine). The data analytics platform allows clinicians to improve genomic diagnostics by applying AI to enhance next-generation sequencing methods. The DDM platform is used for oncology, hereditary cancers, metabolic disorders, pediatrics, cardiology, and for rare disease research. The company initially designed the platform to help hospitals process and store large genomic data sets, but after research showed the more important issue with the technology was data accuracy, the platform's focus shifted.

In 2018, Sophia Genetics acquired Nénuphar, a technology that uses patient data and algorithms to predict tumor growth.

In May 2024, the company announced a collaboration with Microsoft and Nvidia to build a whole-genome sequencing application on the platform, using Nvidia's Parabricks genomics software hosted on Microsoft Azure cloud infrastructure.

In September 2024, the company launched a new generation of the SOPHiA DDM platform, redesigned around a microservices architecture intended to process larger datasets more efficiently. The platform holds CE-IVD certification under the EU In Vitro Diagnostic Regulation (IVDR) for several diagnostic solutions, including hereditary cancer, homologous recombination deficiency (HRD), and RNA-based oncology testing.

== Partnerships ==
In 2016, Sophia Genetics entered into a comarketing agreement with Illumina allowing the two companies to promote adoption of next- generation DNA sequencing.

In 2019, Sophia Genetics formed partnerships with Integrated DNA Technologies and Paragon Genomics, next-generation sequencing (NGS) assay development company, to provide COVID-19 test kits

In 2021, the company partnered with MGI, a subsidiary of BGI Group, to enable their users to access the SOPHiA DDM Platform for data analysis and interpretation. In March 2021, Sophia Genetics announced a long-term collaboration agreement with Hitachi. That same year, Sophia Genetics also worked with GE HealthCare to build an analytics platform that matches patients' treatment regimens for their specific genomic signature, cancer type, and lifelong health record.

In 2022, the firm committed to a collaboration with Memorial Sloan Kettering Cancer Center to advance predictive tumor analysis and, more broadly, clinical decision support.

In March 2023, the German biotechnology company Qiagen and Sophia Genetics paired their company's technology together for somatic variant detection. In october of the same year, the company entered a partnership with the pharmaceutical company AstraZeneca and Memorial Sloan Kettering Cancer Center to offer to more hospitals and patients around the world access to MSK's blood and tumor sequencing tests via Sophia's data-driven medicine platform.

In 2024, Sophia Genetics entered a collaboration with NVIDIA and Microsoft to launch a whole-genome sequencing application.

In September 2025, Sophia Genetics and Myriad Genetics announced a strategic collaboration to co-develop a global liquid biopsy companion diagnostic based on the MSK-ACCESS assay, with Myriad leading regulatory submissions in the United States and Sophia Genetics managing submissions outside the U.S.

In June 2026, the company signed a memorandum of understanding with Memorial Sloan Kettering Cancer Center to explore forming a joint venture establishing a precision oncology hub, combining MSK's clinical and genomic data with the SOPHiA DDM platform.
