= Daimler Car Hire Garage =

Coordinates: 51.5236°N 0.1257°W

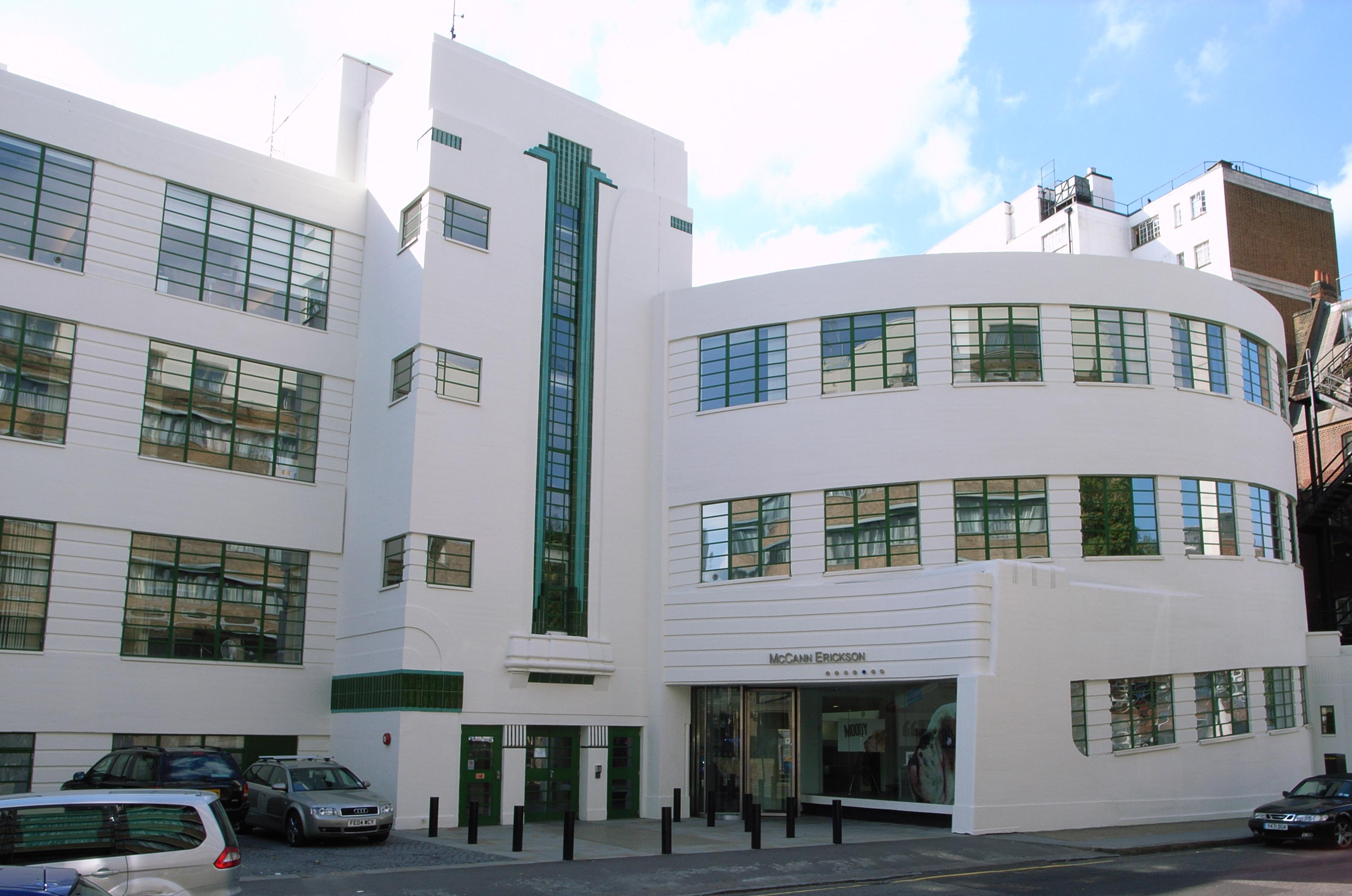
Former Daimler Car Hire Garage, Bloomsbury

The Daimler Car Hire Garage, (Note: This name has been used informally for the building, but Heritage England records it as "Frames Coach Station and London Borough of Camden Car Park") is a garage built in Art Deco style for Daimler Hire Limited at 7-11 Herbrand Street, Bloomsbury, London, England. It was grade II listed by Historic England in 1982.

== History ==
The building was completed in 1931 for Daimler Hire Limited in the Art Deco and Streamline Moderne styles to a design by the architects Wallis, Gilbert and Partners. Pevsner and Cherry describe it as "Stuccoed concrete, with a bold spiral ramp continuing to the roof, as if more floors were intended; abstract Art Deco ornament around windows and staircase entrance".

In 1958 the building was sold to Hertz when Hertz acquired Daimler Hire. The upper floors of the building was subsequently used as the headquarters for the London Taxi Company, while the basement was occupied by Frames Rickard Coaches, and the building became known as the Frames Coach Station. In 2000 it was refurbished by PKS Architects, converted into offices and occupied by the advertising agency McCann (at the time McCann Erickson). They moved out in 2010.

== Current ==
The building is currently single-let to Thought Machine Group, a UK fintech company, on a secure lease expiring in September 2032.
