= Playfair Capital =

British venture capital

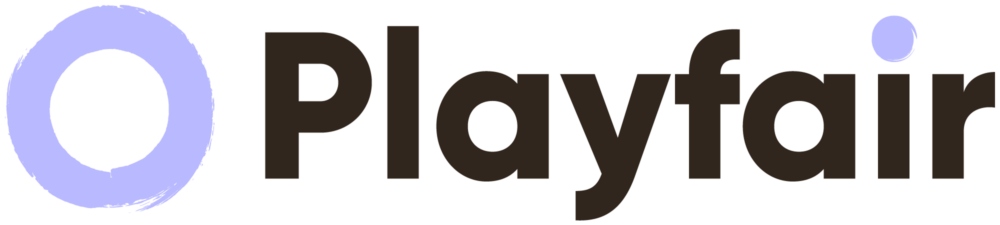
- Industry: Venture Capital
- Founded: 2013; 12 years ago
- Headquarters: London, UK,
- Key people: Federico Pirzio-Biroli, Chris Smith, Henrik Wetter Sanchez
- Number of employees: 10
- Website: playfair.vc

Playfair Capital is a British venture capital firm, focused exclusively on pre-seed investing. The headquarters are located in 8 Warner Yard, Clerkenwell, London.

Their high-conviction, low-volume approach leads Playfair to invest in 6-8 startups per year across all sectors and verticals, as long as there is a technology element. Their geographical focus is on the UK and Europe.

== History ==
Playfair Capital was founded in 2013 by Federico Pirzio-Biroli. The company is incorporated as Playfair Capital LLP with registered office in London. Playfair Capital was realised out of the angel investing career of Federico Pirzio-Biroli which began two years prior in 2011. He had made 21 investments during that time while serving as an angel investor-in-residence in White Bear Yard.

Playfair Capital has invested in three companies that have achieved unicorn status; Stripe, Andela and Thought Machine. Other portfolio firms have raised follow-on rounds or achieved acquisitions, including AeroCloud Systems, which raised US $12.6 million in 2023, and Ravelin Technology, announced for acquisition by Worldpay in 2025.

In 2016, Playfair Capital announced its decision to close the co-working business at Warner Yard, its London-based office building and previous office of Techstars London. The co-working space operation transitioned to a single-tenant leasing model, with the top floor retained for Playfair's own use.

The Female Founder Office Hours (FFOH) initiative, launched in 2019 by Playfair Capital, is a programme oriented to female-led, technology-based companies headquartered in Europe. Each edition of this initiative matches participating female founders with investors for one-to-one mentoring or pitching sessions. For example, one edition brought together over 300 founders and 200 investors. Applications for the initiative require that the company is tech-based, headquartered in Europe, women-led, and generally in the pre-Series A stage. In previous editions, Playfair have held the initiative with other partners including Google for Startups and Tech Nation.

The fund has made over 120 investments. Some publicly mentioned companies include Ravelin, Thought Machine, ProtexAI, Nory, Orca AI, AeroCloud Systems and StackOne.

== Team ==
Playfair Capital's leadership includes Managing Partner Chris Smith, and General Partner, Henrik Wetter Sanchez.

== Funding ==
Playfair Capital's original funding came from its founder Federico Pirzio-Biroli and his previous activities. In March 2019, Playfair Capital raised a new $32 million fund, where Pirzio-Biroli was sole LP, to continue investing in promising early-stage tech startups. In March 2023, Playfair closed $70m for its pre-seed fund, taking its total raised to $102m.

== Exits ==
- Trouva (acquired by MADE.com in May 2022)
- Mapillary (acquired by Meta Platforms, Inc. in June 2020)
- CryptoFacilities (acquired by Kraken in February 2019)
- Acasa (acquired by Goodlord in October 2021)
- Jukedeck (acquired by Bytedance in July 2019)
- Hassle.com (acquired by Helpling in July 2015)
- Gluru (acquired by Dialpad in September 2021)
- Ravelin (acquired by Worldpay, transaction announced February 2025)
- Omnipresent (acquired by Deel, in October 2025)
