= Ross Bailey =

English entrepreneur (born 1992)

- Born: Luton, England
- Occupation: entrepreneur
- Years active: 2013-present
- Known for: founder of Appear Here

Ross Bailey is an English entrepreneur from Luton. He is the CEO and founder of Appear Here, an online marketplace for short-term retail space. Bailey's work has been featured in publications including the Financial Times, The Wall Street Journal, The Guardian, GQ, Property Week, Monocle, Wired, and TechCrunch.

Bailey was named one of Forbes Europe's 30 Under 30 in 2016 and one of the Financial Times' Top 10 under 30 tech entrepreneurs. In 2018, he was listed in Fast Company's 100 most creative people.

== Early life ==
Bailey was born and raised in Luton, England. Bailey started his business, Appear Here, at the age of 19.

== Career ==
In 2013, Bailey founded Appear Here, based on the concept that renting commercial property should be as easy as booking a hotel room. In 2019, The Times reported that Bailey and Appear Here were considering further expansion, seeking to "take on leases for entire department stores" and "capitalizing on the struggles of traditional department stores on both sides of the Atlantic."
