= Transit (app) =

Canadian transport app

- Developer: Transit
- Release: 2012; 14 years ago
- Operating system: Android, iOS
- Type: GPS navigation software
- Website: transitapp.com

Transit is a mobile app providing real-time public transport data. The app functions in over 1130 metropolitan areas across 34 countries around the world.

== Description ==
Transit was designed for aggregating and mapping real-time public transit data as well as crowdsourcing user data to determine the true location of buses and trains. Transit was first released in 2012 for iPhone and soon after launched the Android-compatible version.

Transit offers users schedules and alerts for multiple modes of transportation where available, including bus, tram, rapid transit, and rail. Transit was developed in Montreal, Quebec, Canada by Sam Vermette and Guillaume Campagna with the goal of minimizing the need for individuals to own vehicles in cities.

Transit is in direct competition with other transit mapping services such as Moovit and Citymapper, as well as general mapping services that also provide transit data such as Google Maps, Bing Maps, and Apple Maps.

Current Transit app executives are Chief Executive Officer Sam Vermette and Chief Business Officer David Block-Schachter. In 2018, Transit raised $17.5 million. The majority of investments came from auto manufacturers. The lead investor was Alliance Ventures. Others included Jaguar Land Rover's venture capital fund, InMotion Ventures, Accel, and Real Ventures.

=== Features ===
Transit is compatible with car-sharing and ride-hailing apps such as Uber, Lyft, Via, and Ola, along with multiple bike-share systems. In April 2018, the app expanded to include scooter-sharing systems in four American cities. The app provides users with a color-coded system that matches colors with modes of transportation in order for users to quickly associate a color with the mode of transportation they are monitoring.

In February 2019, the Transit app released an update that allowed users to look up bus and train schedules for their whole city even without a data connection, or determine if a bike-sharing station has bikes available. Even when users are offline, they are able to find the nearest public transport stops and map their journey.

In September 2024, bike routing was added to the app, with a focus on routing through safer bike paths.

=== Supported regions ===
Transit is supported in 34 countries across the globe, including Argentina, Australia, Canada, France, Germany, Iceland, Ireland, Italy, Malaysia, New Zealand, Poland, Sweden, the United Kingdom, the United States and more. Transit is available in over 1130 cities and regions across the world.

== Partners ==
Transit supports multiple mobile ticketing platforms including Token Transit and Masabi. After entering payment information into the app, users are able to purchase ride and bike share passes within the app's interface.

=== Endorsements ===
Transit has partnered with various public agencies in Canada, the United States, France, Ireland and New Zealand to become their "official" or "endorsed" multimodal app. Agencies that have endorsed the app include:

In Canada:

- BC Transit
- Calgary Transit
- Edmonton Transit Service
- Halifax Transit
- OC Transpo – Ottawa, ON
- Roam Transit
- Société de transport de l'Outaouais
- Société de transport de Montréal
- Toronto Transit Commission (TTC)
- TransLink – Metro Vancouver, BC

In the United States:

- ABQ RIDE – Albuquerque, NM
- Central Ohio Transit Authority
- Capital Area Transportation Authority – Lansing, MI
- Capital Metropolitan Transit Authority – Austin, TX
- Chicago Transit Authority
- City and County of Honolulu (TheBus & Skyline) – Honolulu, HI
- Golden Gate Transit – San Francisco Bay Area, CA
- Green Mountain Transit – Burlington, VT
- Los Angeles Metro
- Maryland Transit Administration
- Massachusetts Bay Transportation Authority
- Metro Transit – Minneapolis and Saint Paul, MN
- Miami-Dade Transit
- Niagara Frontier Transportation Authority - Buffalo, NY
- Omnitrans – San Bernardino Valley, CA
- Pinellas Suncoast Transit Authority – Pinellas County, FL
- Pioneer Valley Transit Authority – Pioneer Valley, MA
- Pittsburgh Regional Transit
- Santa Clara Valley Transportation Authority
- Santa Monica Big Blue Bus
- Suburban Mobility Authority for Regional Transportation – Detroit, MI
- Transit Authority of Northern Kentucky
- Utah Transit Authority

In France:

- Blois
- Châlons en champagne
