= Workhuman =

Human capital management software company

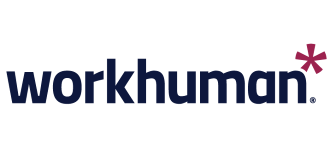
- Type: Private
- Industry: Human Capital Management Software
- Founded: 1999; 27 years ago, in Dublin, Ireland
- Founder: Eric Mosley; Eddie Reynolds
- Headquarters: Dublin, Ireland; Framingham, Massachusetts, U.S.
- Website: www.workhuman.com

Workhuman is an American-Irish multinational company co-headquartered in Dublin and Framingham, Massachusetts, providing cloud-based (software as a service), human capital management (HCM) software solutions. Its social recognition solutions are designed for employees to recognize and reward each other. The company also hosts large annual conferences in the US.

== History ==
Workhuman was founded in 1999 as Globoforce by Eric Mosley and Eddie Reynolds in Dublin, Ireland. The company is backed by Atlas Venture and Balderton Capital.

In 2005, the company re-located part of its operations to the United States.

In February 2019, the company changed its name from Globoforce to Workhuman.
