= Citymapper =

British public transit app and mapping service

- Developer(s): Citymapper Limited

Stable release(s)
- iOS: 10.58.4 / February 13, 2023; 2 years ago
- Android: 10.59.1 / February 27, 2023; 2 years ago
- Wear OS: 10.59.1 / February 27, 2023; 2 years ago
- Operating system: iOS 13 or later; watchOS 8 or later; Android; Wear OS
- Type: GPS navigation software
- License: Proprietary software
- Website: citymapper.com

Citymapper is a British public transit app and mapping service which displays transport options, usually with live timing, between any two locations in a supported city. It integrates data for all urban modes of transport, including walking, cycling and driving, in addition to public transport. It is free of charge to users, and is supported by a mobile app on devices such as mobile phones, and by an Internet website.

The underlying data is pulled from a variety of sources, including open data (usually GTFS-files provided by transport authorities) and local transit authorities. Some data is user-generated or collected by local employed personnel.

Citymapper started in 2011 in London. Its second city was New York. In August 2020 travel in 58 cities and metropolitan areas was covered. Citymapper was founded by Azmat Yusuf, a former Google employee, who also serves as Citymapper's CEO.

In December 2019 the app added a feature which allows users to choose between a "fast" route or "main roads" which avoid dimly-lit areas.

As of 2023, the company provides its services to more than 50 million users across 100 cities.

== Other services ==
In September 2017, Citymapper launched a night bus service in the East End of London. The service in various iterations was called Smartbus, SmartRide, and Ride. The service used eight-passenger vans, as London's transit authority, Transport for London, did not allow Citymapper to operate full-size buses. Citymapper discontinued this service in July 2019.

In February 2019, Citymapper launched Pass, a weekly subscription that gave users access to some forms of public transit in London, at lower cost than other weekly passes.

== Corporate finances ==
In 2019, Citymapper earned £5.8 million in revenue but had net losses in excess of £9 million.

As of May 2021, Citymapper has raised £45 million in venture capital funding. In May 2021, the company launched a crowdfunding campaign targeted at retail investors. The company plans to use the funds to expand services into additional cities.

In March 2023, Citymapper was acquired by Via Transportation for undisclosed terms.

== See also ==
- Transit (app)
- Moovit
