= Moovit =

Transportation app

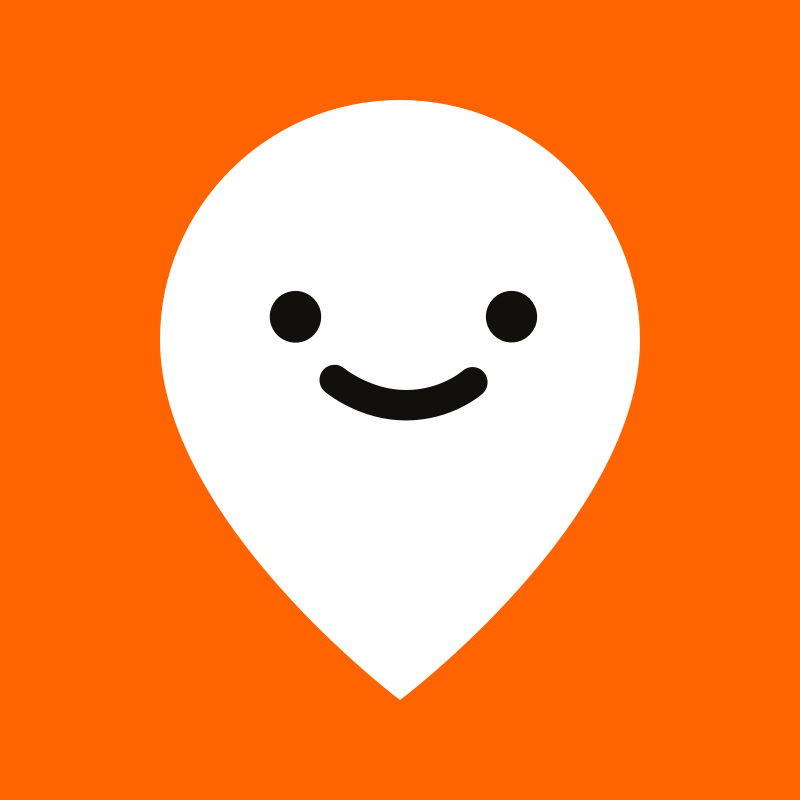
- Developer: Moovit Inc
- Stable release: 5.118 (iOS); 5.118 (Android); 5.0 (Moovit on Web)
- Operating system: Android, iOS, Mobile Web
- Type: GPS navigation software
- License: Software: Proprietary; Maps: Proprietary & OpenStreetMap data.
- Website: moovitapp.com

Moovit (Hebrew: מוביט) is an Israel-based mobility as a service provider and journey planner app. It is owned by Mobileye and was acquired by Intel in 2020 until Mobileye's IPO in 2022. Moovit uses both crowdsourced and official public transit data to provide route planning to users as well as transit data APIs to transit companies, cities, and transit agencies. Because Moovit integrates crowdsourced data, it can provide transit information for areas where no data is officially available.

== History ==
Originally named Tranzmate, Moovit was founded as a startup in Israel in 2012 by developers Nir Erez, Roy Bick, and Yaron Evron. The company raised $3.5 million in its first round of funding from Gemini Funds and BRM Capital. By the beginning of 2013, the company launched worldwide. In 2013, Moovit went on to receive $28 million of funding from venture-capital Sequoia Capital, BRM Group, and Gemini Funds.

In March 2014, Moovit launched a "community editor" allowing volunteer editors to generate schedule and map data, providing transit data for areas where no data is officially available to app developers.

In January 2015, the company raised $50 million in its Series-C funding round from new and previous investors.

In 2016, Moovit was awarded The Atlas Award by the think-tank Ayn Rand Institute.

In February 2018, Moovit raised another $50 million in its Series-D funding round. The funding was led by Intel Capital, the venture capital arm of Intel, with additional participation by former investors. As part of the round, Amnon Shashua, vice president of Intel, joined Moovit's board of directors as an observer.

In December 2017, the app reached 100 million users. It provided service in 1,500 cities in 78 countries. In August 2019, Moovit announced that it is used by over 500 million people around the world and is available in more than 3,000 cities across 92 countries around the world. In February 2020, the app reached 720 million users and provided service in 100 countries, and by May 2020, when Intel acquired Moovit, it had 800 million users.

In May 2020, Moovit was acquired by Intel for $900 million to enhance Intel's purchase of another Israeli mobility tech firm, Mobileye. In October 2022; Intel took Moovit's unit public as part of Mobileye's IPO.

== Partnerships ==
Moovit has been named the official mobility partner for several sporting events and sports teams. The company was the official mobility app for the 2016 Olympic Games, UEFA Euro 2016, and the 2018 Asian Games. In 2018, the company partnered with Unipublic to provide mobility services for the multi-stage bicycle race Vuelta a España. Moovit has also been named as the official mobility app of AS Roma, Inter Milan, and Olympique de Marseille.

In November 2018, it was announced that Moovit and Microsoft entered into a partnership to provide Moovit's public transit data to Azure Maps to provide transit data and APIs to developers.

In February 2019, Moovit, TomTom, and Microsoft announced a multi-modal trip planner, combining driving, parking and taking public transit.

In October 2019, Moovit began collaborating with Waze to integrate Waze's carpooling service into Moovit's service in the US, Brazil, Mexico and Israel.

In January 2020, Moovit and Cubic Transportation Systems announced that they entered into a partnership to incorporate Moovit's Mobility-as-a-Service (MaaS) functionality with Cubic's Traveler App.

In September 2021, Moovit and Arriva announced that they entered into a partnership to launch in the Netherlands a nationwide Mobility-as-a-Service (MaaS) app named 'Glimble' powered by Moovit that enables travelers to plan journeys and pay for them on any public transport operator, shared transport or micromobility provide.

== Product ==
Moovit
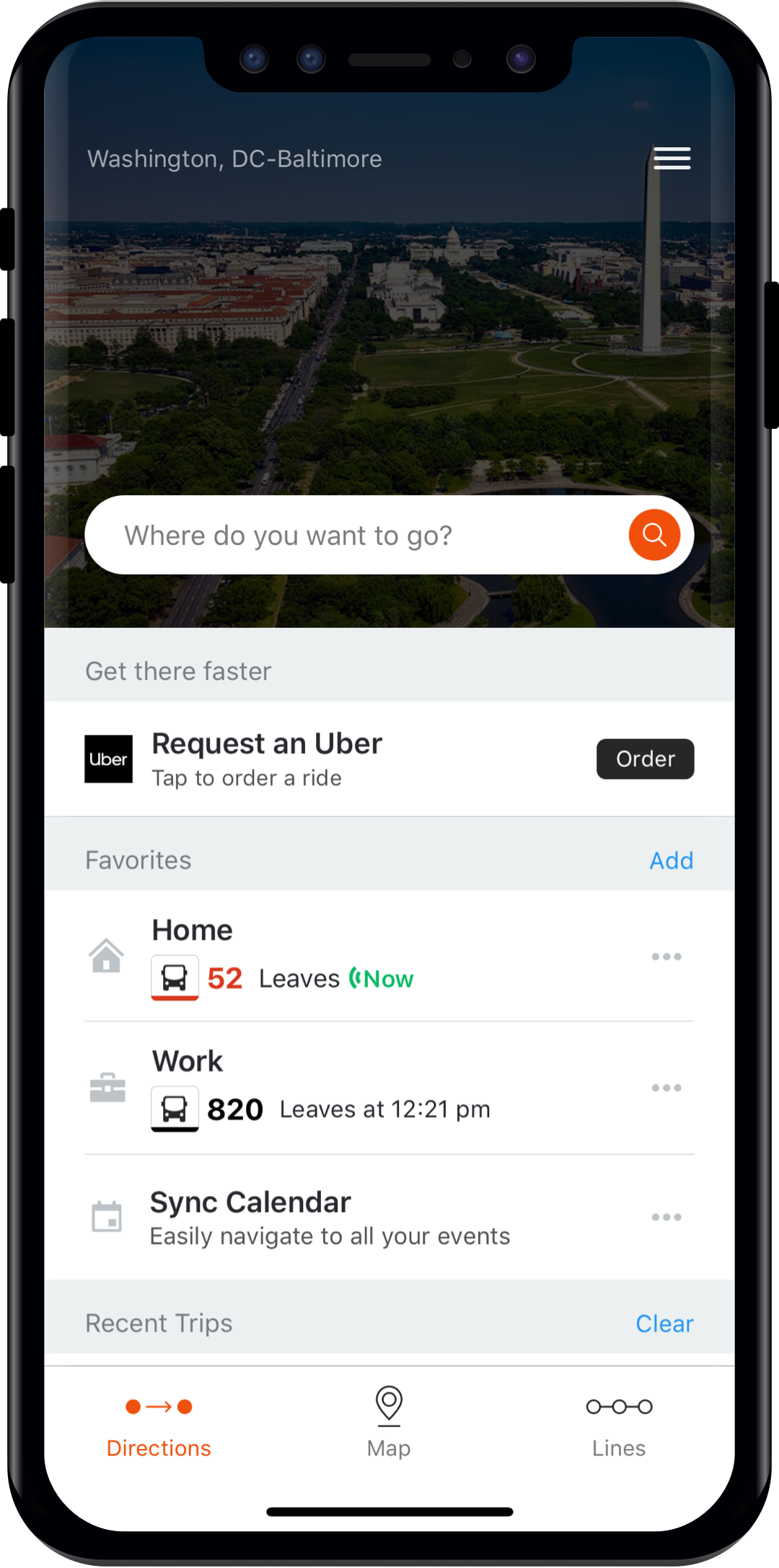
- Sample screenshot of Moovit for iPhone, ver 5.36
- Original author: Moovit
- Release: February 9, 2012; 14 years ago
- Operating system: Android; iOS; Web browser

Moovit offers a real-time journey planner mobile and web app to navigate public transit networks with GPS navigation across transit modes, including buses, ferries, rapid transit (metro/subway/underground, etc.), trains, trams, trolleybuses, ride-hailing, shared bicycle, car sharing, and e-scooters. Users can access a live map and view nearby stops and stations based on their current GPS location, as well as plan trips across transportation modes based on real-time data.

The application differs from traditional public transit applications as it integrates official public transit data from transit operators with real-time data collected from users via crowdsourcing. In addition to passively sharing data, users can actively send reports, including reasons for delays, overcrowding, satisfaction with their bus driver, and Wi-Fi availability.

== Services ==
In June 2017, Moovit announced a new tool for city authorities and transport agencies called 'Moovit urban mobility analytics' that uses population movement data and analytics to provide visual insights on public transport.

In January 2019, Moovit announced TimePro, a cloud-based GPS-based AVL solution for transit agencies. TimePro provides users with real-time bus arrival and a web dashboard displaying information for all running vehicles.

Moovit's Transit APIs are used by Uber and Lyft for public transit options.

In October 2019, Michigan governor Gretchen Whitmer announced that a mobility app would be developed by Moovit, offering autonomous vehicle rides for attendees of the 2020 North American International Auto Show in Detroit in June 2020.

In December 2020, Moovit and SmartBus announced the launch of the Quick CONNECT service in Detroit, powered by Moovit On-Demand technology.

In July 2022, Moovit announced the launch of its location-based advertising platform.

== Controversy ==
In January 2021, it was publicly condemned after the predominantly-Black area in Nova Scotia, Canada referred to as "Dartmouth-Preston" on its map appeared as "Niggerville" in its listings for up to two weeks. Moovit publicly apologized and maintained that its team works hard to filter out and remove inaccurate information "as soon as we become aware of it".

== Popularity of Moovit in public transport ==
In 2021, a study by Georgina Santos and Nikolay Nikolaev explored the association between the popularity of searches on Google related to Moovit and the share of workers who commute by public transport. The study focused on metropolitan areas in the United States from 2010 to 2019 and found a positive correlation. They speculate that metropolitan areas with pre-existing higher shares of workers commuting by public transport tend to be metropolitan areas where use of Moovit is more likely.

== See also ==
- Transit (app)
- Citymapper
- Crowdmapping
- Comparison of satellite navigation software
