= Rebtel =

Swedish telecommunications company

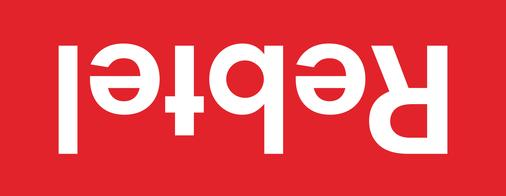
- Type: Private
- Industry: Telecommunications
- Founded: 2006
- Founders: Hjalmar Winbladh, Jonas Lindroth
- Headquarters: Stockholm, Sweden
- Key people: Leo Kia – CEO; Johan Licke von Sydow – CFO; Carl-Johan Hedström – CPO
- Website: https://www.rebtel.com

Rebtel is a Swedish telecommunications company headquartered in Stockholm, Sweden. The company provides international calling and mobile top-up services, primarily targeting migrant communities. Rebtel was founded in 2006 by Swedish serial entrepreneurs Hjalmar Winbladh and Jonas Lindroth, and operates through RebTel Networks AB.

== History ==
Rebtel launched in 2006 offering low-cost international calling by routing calls through local access numbers. The company later expanded into mobile applications, VoIP-based services, subscription calling plans, and mobile top-ups.

Between 2018 and 2023, Rebtel introduced additional services such as international money transfer and, in selected markets, last-mile delivery under the Mandao brand. Both initiatives were discontinued in 2025 as the company refocused on its core communications offering.

- Rebtel Money Transfer was phased out in early 2025.
- Mandao was discontinued in May 2025.

In April 2025, Rebtel appointed Leo Kia as CEO, signaling a strategic shift toward accelerating growth, modernizing the company’s product and technology stack, and deprioritizing dividends in favor of reinvestment.

== Services ==
As of 2025, Rebtel offers the following services:

- International calling (VoIP, local access numbers, subscription plans)
- Mobile top up / Airtime recharge to prepaid mobile numbers worldwide
- Unlimited calling plans
- App-to-app calling
- Local numbers in selected markets

== Financial Information ==
The most recently available financial statements for RebTel Networks AB (fiscal year 2024) report:

- Net revenue: SEK 1,354,440,000
- Operating result: approximately SEK 115,861,000
- Employees: 44 (2024)

== Ownership / Investors ==
Rebtel is privately held. Historically, the company has been backed by several venture capital firms, including:

- Balderton Capital
- Index Ventures

== Management ==
Rebtel's principal owners are European London-based venture capital funds Balderton Capital and Index Ventures. Its management team consists of the following people:

- Erik Olofsson – Chief Executive Officer
- Svante Pagels – Chief Commercial Officer
- Anna Skallefell – Chief Financial Officer
- Jude Mukundane – Chief Technology Officer

== Products and services ==
=== Rebtel ===
Rebtel provides low-cost or free international call services. Its service was first available as an intermediary service accessible by dialing a particular phone number but is now available through iOS and Android apps with a combined download count totaling over 10M users.

=== Mobile top-up money transfer ===
Rebtel's tech platform supports money transfer in the form of mobile top-up, in which users can transfer credit to others by mobile phone a practice common in parts of the world with unreliable or nonexistent financial systems. In early 2018, the company launched Nauta for the Cuban community.

=== Activist program (Rebtel Activista) ===
Rebtel's Activist program was launched in 2016 as a pilot in Miami, Florida, enabling anyone to sign up to become a Rebtel reseller through the independent Activist app. Since the launch, the Activist program has expanded to Houston, Texas. Over 10,000 people have joined the program.

=== Beyond Borders magazine ===
In late 2017, Rebtel launched and published its first edition of Beyond Borders, an online magazine and community that curates and creates content and journalism for international migrants and immigrants.

=== SDK ===
Rebtel launched a software development kit (SDK) in September 2012, allowing independent developers to integrate voice calling and instant messaging in their apps. The Rebtel SDK currently supports app-to-app communication over data—such as 3G or Wi-Fi—and uses the same backend as Rebtel's own apps. Developers can decide how to handle aspects of the user experience, such as user management, ringtones, and calling screens.

=== Sendly ===
In December 2013, Rebtel launched Sendly, an app that lets users top up the prepaid mobile phones of friends and family abroad.

== History ==
Hjalmar Winbladh co-founded and spent seven years as president and CEO of Sendit AB, taking the firm public before it was acquired by Microsoft for US$127.5 million in 1999. Rebtel appointed Andreas Bernström, formerly COO of TradeDoubler, as CEO in September 2009. In late 2015, Bernström left the company and was succeeded by Magnus Larsson. In 2014, a group of former executives from Tele2—a telecommunications company owned by Swedish investment company Kinnevik—approached the company's owners with a proposal for a shift in strategy.

Following a brand overhaul, a product strategy shift to a subscription model and flat-rate pricing, and the launch of an independent work program (Activist), the company experienced a turnaround: it grew 40% after one year and reached a revenue of $95 million in 2017. CEO Magnus Larsson told Thomson Reuters in 2017 that he had no plans to make the company public.

In 2020, Rebtel posted revenue above $150 million and seemed on track to exceed $200 million in 2021, mostly boosted by communication needs during COVID-19 lockdowns. In 2021, Rebtel split with Majority, a fintech with the aim of solving banking needs for immigrants. Rebtel then took on new management and has since positioned itself as a marketplace for the global immigrant population's cross-border communication and remittance needs.

== Timeline ==
- May 2005: Rebtel is registered by Hjalmar Winbladh and Jonas Lindroth.
- September 2006: Rebtel raises Series A round of US$20 million in external venture capital financing from Index Ventures and Balderton Capital.
- October 2009: Rebtel launches its iPhone application after a nine-month approval process with Apple.
- June 2010: Rebtel reports a 100% jump in revenue over the previous year, increasing revenue from $8 million to $16 million. The service also logs its one billionth minute in international calls.
- January 2011: Rebtel reports 9 million users, revenues of more than $40 million in 2011, and a revenue run-rate projected to hit $75 million by the end of the year.
- November 2011: Rebtel is awarded the Swedish Innovation Award. Previous winners include music streaming service Spotify.
- September 2012: Rebtel releases its SDK, allowing developers to integrate voice calling into their applications.
- December 2012: Rebtel reports revenues of $80 million and 20 million users.
- December 2013: Rebtel launches Sendly, a new service for transferring prepaid mobile credit internationally. Rebtel reports revenues of $95 million and 23 million users.
- January 2016: Rebtel appointed Magnus Larsson as CEO and communicated the goal of becoming the primary app for international calling (similar to WhatsApp for texting).
- April 2017: Rebtel says to Thomson Reuters that it seeks a $20 million "cash injection for growth."
- August 2017: Rebtel Activist's independent work program fuels rapid US market growth; the CEO claims a 20% growth target for 2017.
- December 2017: Rebtel launches an online magazine for migrants and international nomads worldwide.
- April 2018: Rebtel announces it has closed its financing process, securing close to $20 million. Now, it aims to invest 130 million Swedish kronor in developing banking products and/or acquire a neo-bank to speed up the execution of the company's new strategy.

== See also ==
- Comparison of VoIP software
- VoIP
- Mobile phone
