= ScanSafe =

- Type: Subsidiary of Cisco
- Industry: Information security
- Founded: 2004
- Headquarters: London, United Kingdom
- Key people: Eldar Tuvey; Roy Tuvey; John Edwards; Jonathan Elstein; Jim Walker; Stephen Dane
- Products: Anti-virus, Anti-spyware, Web filtering, Messaging
- Number of employees: 150
- Parent: Cisco
- Website: www.scansafe.com

ScanSafe was a privately held company backed by investors Benchmark Capital and Scale Venture Partners, until its 2009 acquisition by Cisco Systems. The company provided Web-based "Software as a service" (SaaS) to organizations.

== History ==
Co-founded in 1999 by brothers Eldar and Roy Tuvey, its services block malware and secure the use of the Web and messaging. Noted as being the first to successfully deliver a Secure Web Gateway service, the company competes with similar services offered by Blue Coat Systems, MessageLabs, Purewire, Webroot, Websense and Zscaler.

ScanSafe has offices in London, England and San Francisco, California and maintains alliance partnerships with Google, AT&T, Sprint, Kaspersky, Telus, NEC, Orange Business Services, Integralis, SoftScan, TopNordic, Viatel, Ancoris, and FVC.

MessageLabs, a major provider of Messaging services ended a strategic partnership between the two companies in 2006. MessageLabs introduced a competing in-house product titled Web Security Service Version 2, resulting in a court judgment brought about by ScanSafe which required MessageLabs to notify all prospective clients that the Version 2 service is not based on ScanSafe technology.

In November 2007, a malware outbreak on the Indiatimes website was reported by ScanSafe. Whilst the website wasn't the only victim, the attack was notable due to the popularity of the website and in the number of vulnerabilities the malware attempted to exploit. Alexa regularly ranks Indiatimes as one of the top 250 most visited websites. In January 2009, ScanSafe reported a malware infection on the official website of Paris Hilton.

In October 2009, ScanSafe discontinued Scandoo, a free service that provided advance warning for security risks and offensive content in search engine results.

In October 2009, Cisco announced the acquisition of ScanSafe for approximately US$183 million. ScanSafe was integrated into the Cisco Security business unit. The deal was completed December 2009.
