= Thought Machine =

London-based banking technology company

- Industry: Financial technology
- Founded: 2014; 12 years ago
- Founder: Paul Taylor
- Headquarters: London, United Kingdom
- Products: Cloud banking software
- Website: www.thoughtmachine.net

Thought Machine is a London-based cloud banking technology company that was founded in 2014 by Paul Taylor. It operates in the United Kingdom, Singapore, the United States, and Australia.

== History ==
Thought Machine was founded in 2014 by Paul Taylor. In 2018, Thought Machine formed a partnership with Lloyds Banking Group which also participated in Thought Machine's $25 million Series A funding round.

In 2019 the company launched its Asia Pacific office in Singapore. Nordic financial group SEB launched UNQUO, a bank designed for entrepreneurs, on Thought Machine’s Vault Core.

In August 2020, Thought Machine joined Banking Industry Architecture Network (BIAN), a non-profit network that provides a common framework for banking. That same year the company raised $125m in a Series B funding round from Molten Ventures, Eurazeo, British Business Bank, SEB, and existing investors. Also in 2020, Andy Maguire, former HSBC Group COO, joined Thought Machine as Chair.

In 2021, Thought Machine closed a $200m Series C funding round, raising the company's valuation to $1bn. After that JPMorgan Chase and ING Poland became its new clients, with JPMorgan planning to use Thought Machine's technology for its retail bank.

In 2022, it announced several clients, including Kiwibank (New Zealand) and Italy's largest bank: Intesa Sanpaolo. Temasek, Intesa Sanpaolo, and Morgan Stanley invested in Thought Machine's $160m series D funding round, doubling the company's valuation to $2.7bn. In February, Vietnamese banking and financial services provider HD Bank has selected Thought Machine to upgrade its core banking system.

In 2023 Thought Machine partnered with C6 Bank and a fintech platform HMBradley.

== Operations ==
Thought Machine has offices in London (in a distinctive art deco building at 7-11 Herbrand Street, Bloomsbury), New York, Singapore, Sydney, and Melbourne. The company develops two products: Vault Core, a cloud-native technology for creating financial products using smart contracts with real-time data access; and Vault Payments, a platform enabling processing of all types of global payments. Some of Thought Machine's clients are JPMorgan, Lloyds Banking Group, Standard Chartered Bank, Intesa Sanpaolo, M1, and Arvest Bank.
