= Rizon =

IRC (internet relay chat) network

- Founded: July 2002; 24 years ago
- Geographic location: Europe; Canada; United States; Asia
- Based in: Worldwide
- Website URL: rizon.net
- Primary DNS: irc.rizon.net
- Average users: 9000
- Average channels: 8000
- Content/subject: Public/Unrestricted

Rizon is an Internet Relay Chat (IRC) network. The IRC network itself ranks number 7 among the largest IRC networks. Rizon is popular with many anime fansubbing groups who work online, many of whom provide their content through XDCC via IRC bots in their distribution channels. It is also used by many users of eRepublik as a means of communication. File sharing of other copyrighted material such as Warez is also common in some channels on the network.

== Rizon IRCd ==
Rizon currently uses Plexus IRCd. Plexus was coded specifically with Rizon in mind and is based on ircd-hybrid. Plexus is not exclusive to Rizon as the IRCd is also used by other networks. Plexus versions 1.x and 2.x were originally coded by static & peer. Plexus 3.x was rewritten by ThaPrince and is now maintained and developed by the Rizon Dev Team.

As of the r524 release, the ability for automatic services authentication using SSL client certificates has been implemented, and was largely based on the work done by OFTC, though significant changes were made regarding server-to-server communication.

== Controversy ==
=== DDoS attack against mIRCX ===
In early 2004 the mIRCX and Aniverse IRC networks were the victims of Denial-of-service attacks (DDoS) and were forced to shut down temporarily; Aniverse later resumed operations at a greatly reduced capacity. This in turn caused approximately 8,000–10,000 IRC users of various anime fansubbing channels to migrate to Rizon. Rizon was forced to increase its number of servers to handle the additional users. This also had the effect of making Rizon a target for DDoS attacks.

Contrary to rumors, Rizon had no part in a DDoS attack against mIRCX in 2004. Richard "Krashed" Roby was the actual perpetrator who initiated the attacks in retaliation against CJB networks for shutting down his botnet. Roby was later raided by the FBI as part of Operation Cyberslam. Initial charges brought against Roby as part of Operation Cyberslam were dropped but he later pleaded guilty to lesser charges and was sentenced to an 18-month prison sentence.

=== DDoS attacks against rival networks ===
On May 25, 2007, as part of Operation: Bot Roast conducted by the FBI, Rizon's founder, Jason Michael Downey aka "Nessun" was charged with using a botnet in 2004 to launch Denial-of-service attacks (DDoS) against other computer networks, including rival IRC networks such as IRCHighway.

On June 20, 2007, Downey pleaded guilty in a US Federal court to operating a botnet "of up to 6,000 infected computers" and using it to launch DDoS attacks "From on or about June 18, 2004 through on or about September 5, 2004." Downey faced up to 24 months in prison and a fine of up to $40,000.

When asked his reasons behind performing the DDoS attacks, Downey explained to U.S. District Judge Nancy G. Edmunds that "I was doing it because I could, more than anything," and "It was a dumb thing to do."

Downey was sentenced on October 23, 2007, to 12 months in prison for causing over $20,000 in losses and damages due to unlawful computer intrusion and was ordered to pay a total of $21,110 in damages to 3 companies that were affected by his DDoS attacks. After his release, Downey will have a probation term of 3 years with no computer access without prior permission and will have to perform 150 hours of community service.
