= Eggdrop =

Chat program

- Developer: Eggheads
- Release: December 1993; 32 years ago
- Stable release: 1.10.2 / 6 September 2026
- Written in: C, Tcl
- Operating system: Unix-like
- Size: 1 MB
- Type: IRC bot
- License: GPL-2.0-or-later
- Website: www.eggheads.org
- Repository: github.com/eggheads/eggdrop

Eggdrop is a popular IRC bot and the oldest that is still being maintained.

It was originally written by Robey Pointer in December 1993 to help manage and protect the EFnet channel #gayteen; one Eggdrop bot version was named Valis.

Eggdrop was originally intended to help manage and protect channels from takeover attempts.

== Features ==
The bot is written in the C programming language and features interfaces for C modules and Tcl scripts that allow users to further enhance the functionality of the bot.

A large number of Tcl scripts are available to expand the bot's functionality, most of them written by Eggdrop users. Scripts are available to add and extend support for: online games, stats, user and channel management, information storage and lookup, greeting channel members, tracking last seen times, botnet management, anti-spam, file serving and distribution (usually via the DCC protocol), IRC services (similar to ChanServ and NickServ), and much more.

Eggdrop includes built-in support for sharing user information and channel bans. However, a script is required to simultaneously control multiple bots and for bots to coordinate channel management and modes.

The bot also features a "botnet", which allows multiple bots to be linked together to share data and act in a coordinated fashion. The botnet supports a "party line", which is accessible via DCC CHAT and Telnet. People can communicate within the botnet on various channels in an equivalent to a miniature IRC. Channel 0, the default, is referred to as the "party line".

== Popularity ==
Over the years Eggdrop has become one of the most popular bots run by IRC users.

== See also ==
- Internet Relay Chat
- Internet Relay Chat bot
- Comparison of Internet Relay Chat bots
- Shell account
- Tcl
