= Communication software =

Software type

Communication software is used to provide remote access to systems and exchange files and messages in text, audio and/or video formats between different computers or users. This includes terminal emulators, file transfer programs, chat and instant messaging programs, as well as similar functionality integrated within MUDs. The term is also applied to software operating a bulletin board system, but rarely to that operating a computer network or Stored Program Control exchange.

== History ==
E-mail was introduced in the early 1960s as a way for multiple users of a time-sharing mainframe computer to communicate. Basic text chat functionality has existed on multi-user computer systems and bulletin board systems since the early 1970s. In the 1980s, a terminal emulator was a piece of software necessary to log into mainframes and thus access e-mail. Prior to the rise of the Internet, computer files were exchanged over dialup lines, requiring ways to send binary files via communication systems that were primarily intended for plain text. Programs implementing special transfer modes were applied using various de facto standards, most notably Kermit.

== Chat ==
In 1985, the first decentralized chat system was created called Bitnet Relay, whereas Minitel probably provided the largest chat system at the same time. In August 1988, the Internet Relay Chat followed. CU-SeeMe was the first chat system to be equipped with a video camera. Instant messaging featuring a buddy list and the notion of online presence was introduced by ICQ in 1996. In the days of the Internet boom, web chats were also popular.

Chatting is a real-time conversation or message exchange that takes place in public or in private groupings called chat rooms. Some chat rooms have moderators who will trace and block offensive comments and other kinds of abuse. Based on visual representation, chats are divided into text based chat rooms such as IRC and Bitnet Relay Chat.
