= Punkrock.net =

Online punk community

- Founded: 1996
- Dissolved: 2001
- Website: punkrock.net at the Wayback Machine (archived 2000-02-29)

Punkrock.net was a website that existed from 1996-2001 as a resource for the punk community. The site was created by Josh Grubman, Sarah Herritage, and Nikki Levine. Originally beginning as a user-submitted database for the DIY traveller and touring punk band, it later morphed into a major online community for punks worldwide to communicate with one another and share ideas.

Punkrock.net drew its userbase primarily from the dying EFnet IRC #sxe and #punk, the Chainsaw Records messageboard, and the newsgroup alt.music.hardcore. Members of the dead SXE-L listserv were also key players of the site. The users all had the same basic underlying interest - punk and hardcore punk music.

The original administrators of the site shut the messageboard down in 2001 after reported "disillusionment" with internet punk communities.
