= Qline =

Q Line may refer to:

- QLine, a streetcar system in Detroit, Michigan
- Q-line, an IRCd configuration
- Q Line, or Q, a New York City Subway line
