= IRCnet =

IRC network

- Founded: 1996; 30 years ago
- Geographic location: Europe; United States
- Based in: Worldwide
- Website URL: www.ircnet.com
- Average users: 20,000–30,000
- Average channels: 10,000–15,000
- Average servers: 30
- Content/subject: Public/Unrestricted

IRCnet is currently one of the largest IRC networks. As of June 2024, it has around 25,000 users using it daily. An early 2005 record had approximately 123,110 users simultaneously connected to the network.

== History ==
Between May and July 1996 IRCnet was formed as a European fork of EFnet, when a number of operator disagreements resulted in a group of European admins declaring their independence. The reasons for the "Great Split" as it came to be called, included:

- a policy disagreement about how much power system operators should have. IRCnet formed with the basis that there should be a set of rules defining what SysOps could and could not do. This viewpoint was opposed by many of the US-based EFnet servers.
- a technical disagreement on whether the network should use timestamping (TS) or Nick Delay as a means to prevent nick collisions, according to Jarkko Oikarinen.
- Vegard Engen, one of the European operators, stated that the immediate cause for the "Great Split" was that a major US EFnet hub had been disconnecting irc.stealth.net without warning, and thereby breaking the link to the European servers.

== Characteristics ==
Many IRCnet servers state that "IRC is a privilege, not a right". That defines the characteristics of network usage ‒ users are normally not permitted to run bots and should avoid abusive behaviour.

Servers are generally open to users from their geographic locations and do not allow outside connections, however, there are a few open exceptions allowing access to users not covered by any local server.

Strict rules are operated for shell providers regulating, limiting or banning their connections.

IRCnet operates few if any network services to service nicknames or channels. It does implement reop -channelmode that allows channel operators to set hostmasks for users to be automatically "reopped" by the server. This mode is called +R with capital R and supersedes the RFC2811 +r (lower-case r) channel mode, available only on !-channels and settable (not resettable) only by their creators.

All network servers run on IRCnet's ircd with the current version 2.11 (the latest software versions are maintained at IRC.ORG).

IRCnet's channel operators are generally free to run their channels however they see fit without the intervention of IRC operators. IRCops are primarily there to handle network and server-related issues, and rarely get involved with channel-level issues.

To fight nickname collisions when splits occur on re-link IRCnet will use unique IDs. If there are two users with the same nickname on both sides of the network when servers are re-linking then both nicknames will be forcefully changed to unique ID instead to prevent collisions.
