= Z-line =

The Z-line or Line Z may refer to:

- J/Z (New York City Subway service)
- Line Z (Tren Interoceánico), a Mexican railroad corridor
- Z-line (IRC), a type of Internet Relay Chat access ban
- Gastroesophageal junction, that joins the oesophagus to the stomach
- Z-line, a border that separates and links sarcomeres within a skeletal muscle
