= IRC bot =

Software that acts as an IRC user

An IRC bot performing a simple task

An IRC bot is a set of scripts or an independent program that connects to Internet Relay Chat as a client, and so appears to other IRC users as another user. An IRC bot differs from a regular client in that instead of providing interactive access to IRC for a human user, it performs automated functions.

== Function ==
Often, an IRC bot is deployed as a detached program running from a stable host. It sits on an IRC channel to keep it open and prevents malicious users from taking over the channel. It can be configured to give channel operator status to privileged users when they join the channel, and can provide a unified channel operator list. Many of these features require that the bot be a channel operator. Thus, most IRC bots are run from computers which have long uptimes (generally running a BSD derivative or Linux) and a fast, stable Internet connection. As IRC has become popular with many dial-up users as well, shell accounts at shell providers have become popular as a stable Linux server with a decent connection to run a bot from.

Aside from managing channel permissions, a bot can also perform functions such as logging what is posted to an IRC channel, giving out information on demand (very popular in IRC channels dealing with user support), creating statistics tracking the channel's top posters and longest-lived lurkers, or hosting trivia, Uno and other games. These functions are usually provided by scripts, often written in a scripting programming language such as Tcl or Perl by the bot's users. Channels dedicated to file sharing often use XDCC bots to distribute their files.

IRC bots are particularly useful on IRC networks such as EFnet and IRCnet without channel registration services, and on networks like Undernet or QuakeNet that require conditions to be met (minimum user count, etc.) before a channel may be registered. Where bots are used for administrative functions such as this, they may need more access than a normal client connection allows. Some versions of IRC have a "Service" protocol that allows clients with these extra powers. Such server-sanctioned bots are called IRC services.

Bots are not always welcome. Some IRC networks forbid the usage of bots. One of the reasons for doing so is that each nickname connected to the network increases the size of the network database which is being kept in sync across all servers. Allowing for bots in large networks can cause a relevant amount of network traffic overhead which needs to be financed and may even lead to netsplits.

== Comparison ==
IRC bot	Primary developers	Software license	Operating system	Programming language	First public release - date (version)	Latest version - date (version)	Notable features	Function scope	Website
AnGeL-Bot	Benedikt Hübschen	GPL-3	Windows	Visual Basic 6	1999 (1.2.0)	2003-05-31 (1.6.2 BETA 10)	The fastest Windows IRC bot of its time, extensive scripting support via Windows Scripting, compatibility with multiple Active Scripting languages, colored partyline, and Eggdrop-compatible botnet support.	multi-purpose	
Cardinal	John Maguire	MIT	Cross-platform	Python 3	2013-02-03 (beta)	2021-01-13 (3.1.0)	Ease of development, re-loadable asynchronous plugins, python decorators for commands, IRC events, simple persistent JSON data storage and a well-documented API.	?	
Pynfo	kuran	GPL-2	Cross-platform	Python	2002-10-21	2013-02-27	Network bridging/relaying, basic "infobot" capabilities, googling, 3 access tiers, and a shorter-link function. Easily extensible and fully disk-persistent.	?	
Supybot	Jeremiah Fincher, James Vega and others	BSD	Cross-platform	Python	? (0.30)	2018-05-10 (0.84.0)	Many plugins, SSL, multiple networks support, (un)loading plugins, threads, configuration registry, standardized command syntax, argument parsing	?	,
Cerberus	Stefan Hüsges	GPL-3.0	Cross-platform	PHP	2008-02-18 (beta)	2016-10-04 (1.6.0)	?	?	
Cinch	Dominik Honnef, Lee Jarvis	MIT	Unix-like	Ruby	2010-07-08 (0.3.2)	2015-03-31 (2.2.5)	Threaded, object-oriented	Bot writing framework	
cIRCuitbot	mistiry	GPL-3.0	Unix-like	PHP	2022-10-14 (0.1.0)	2026-04-30 (0.6.2)	Easily-extensible modular design, bridge support allows relayed users to interact as if they were on IRC, mature codebase that predates public release by nearly 10 years. IRCv3 CAP Negotiation, SASL Auth, TLS Support.	Core framework extended upon by addons including Trivia, Quotes System, Web Search, URL Title extraction, Google Gemini querying, Regex Replace, and other popular IRC bot features.	Core / Addons
CNT Bot	CNT Bot Team	Unlicense	Unix-like	TCL	2015-06-15 (0.1)	2015-07-24 (0.2)	Voting, polling, elect/recall delegates, hold plenaries, admission control, automatically connects to other CNT Bots	Democracy software for digital activists building flat, horizontal networks	
Darkbot	Jason Hamilton, juice	GPL	Unix-like	C	?	?	?	responds to user questions from database	
Daskeb	Digit	GPL	Unix-like	Haskell	?	?	minimal starter bot	?	
Eggdrop	Eggheads	GPL	Cross-platform	C	1993-12	2022-03-06 (1.9.2)	SSL, botnet, partyline, filesharing, user management, IRC bot uptime contest, supports scripting in tcl	multi-purpose	
EnergyMech	Proton	GPL	Unix-like	C	1998-09-10 (2.5.24, first release by Proton)	2018-03-09 (3.0.99p4)	single-thread multi-bot capable, low resource usage, botnet, user management, channel moderation, built-in irc bouncer, can be upgraded without disconnecting, IRC bot uptime contest, supports scripting in tcl, python.	multi-purpose	
Erebot	François Poirotte	GPL-3.0	Cross-platform	PHP	2010-10-09	2011-05-08	Extensible with many modules and support for multiple networks, multiple identities, SSL/TLS, STARTTLS, IdentD and various IRC daemons extensions. Can be used as a framework to create advanced channel bots.	games	
Erwin	Idar Lund	GPL-2.0+	Cross-platform	Perl	2004-04-05 (1.0-beta1)	2017-03-19 (1.2.0)	Easily expandable by writing new modules.	Replies to users from database.	
FoxBot	Lee Watson	GPL-3.0	Cross-platform	Java	?	2013-09-06 (0.9)	Command framework is designed to make writing commands easy. Has simple and powerful permissions system. Simple and fully explained config.	?	
FoxEye	Andriy Grytsenko	GPL	Unix-like	C	2011-01 (beta)	2011-02-24 (0.9b10)	Multithreaded, multinetworked. Encoding chosen per user or network. Extendible by plugins, can be used as client or whatever. Currently supported scripts: Lua, Tcl.	kit to build internet client / server / gateway, primary for messaging networks	
Gambot	Derek Hoagland	GPL	Unix-like	Perl	2011-1-1	2011-07-16 (1.0)	Framework for creating bots. Messages handled completely asynchronously. Extensible in any programming language. Can be updated without reconnecting, restarting, or reloading.	Twitter and other feeds, games / memes,	
Gozerbot	Bart Thate	BSD	Unix-like	Python	?	? (1.0.1)	IRC and XMPP bot; can be bridged with Google Wave	?	
mikoskinen	Geoff Woollams	MIT	Cross-platform	C#	2015-10-08	2015-10-09 (0.1)	IRC commands can launch any command line or http request to allow any program or script to control the bot by its output. MySQL support for non user initiated actions and 3rd party integration.	?	
guppy	Svetlana Tkachenko	GPL	Cross-platform	Python	2011-03-20	2012-12-11 (0.4.3)	easy to install, modular structure	multi-purpose	
Ibid	Jonathan Hitchcock, Michael Gorven, Stefano Rivera	GPL3, core under MIT	Unix-like	Python, Twisted in IM protocols	? (0.1.0)	? (0.1.1)	Twisted engine allows connecting to multiple IM sources, including IRC, XMPP, SILC, Campfire, NMDC	? + plugin "factoids" responds to users from database	
Infobot	Kevin Lenzo	Artistic License	Unix-like	Perl	2004-08	2008-08-01 (1.5.3)	?	replies to users from database	
IrcBot	Marlinc	BSD	Unix-like	PHP	? (0.1)	? (1.2)	?	?	
jenni	Michael Yanovich	EFLv2	Unix-like	Python (2)	?	?	Threaded, general purpose, includes some games. Easily expandable by writing new modules.	user management, conversation / lookup, games	
irccd	David Demelier	ISC	Cross-platform	C++17 and JavaScript	2013-09-13 (1.0.0)	2021-01-04 (3.1.1)	Multiple servers, rules filtering, templates system, cross-platform, extensible with JavaScript and C++ plugins	bot framework	
Jerkbot	Jason Stephenson	Artistic License 2.0	Cross-platform	Sleep	2014-02-10 (1.0)	2017-08-29 (1.7.65)	Configurable chatter bot, written as jIRCii script	responsive chatter + learns + modules	
JSONBOT	Bart Thate	MIT	Unix-like	Python	2010-04	2012-03-23 (0.84.4)	Beta		
JZBot	Alexander Boyd, Maximilian Dirkmann, James Stoker	LGPL	Cross-platform	Java	?	?	?	feeds, werewolf / maffia, karma system, reminders	
KGB	Martín Ferrari and Damyan Ivanov	GPL-2+	Cross-platform	Perl	2008-07-14 (Git)	2014-09-17 (1.3.3)	KGB is a system that provides notifications on IRC for commits made to Git, Subversion and CVS repositories.	notifications on code commits	
Lambdabot	Andrew J. Bromage et al.	MIT	Unix-like	Haskell	? (1.0)	2011-01-20 (4.2.3.2)	Many plugins; usable offline as a Haskell development tool; embeddable in GHCi	haskell development tool	
Limnoria		BSD	Cross-platform	Python	?	2022-07-29 (2022.07.29)	See Supybot	A maintained fork of Supybot	
Mozbot	Ian Hickson, Chris Crews	MPL	Cross-platform	Perl	?	?	?	services to developer communities	
MrBot - AwesomeBot	MattMc	Apache v2	Cross-platform	Java	November '13	2014-06-01	A Semi-Advanced Java Bot with a ton of feactures and still more coming... join #AwesomeBot on espernet for more info..	factoids + lastseen	
nibblrjr	Kirjava	None	Cross-platform	JavaScript	?	?	bot framework for creating custom behaviour dynamically	Bot framework	
node-irc	Martyn Smith	GPLv3	Unix-like	JavaScript	?	2015-01-16 (0.3.9)	Node- native non blocking	NodeJS IRC library.	
PircBot	Paul Mutton	GPL	Cross-platform	Java	2001-08-01	2009-12-14 (1.5.0)	Framework for creating bots	framework to create bots	
pmxbot	YouGov, Jamie Turner, Chris Mulligan	MIT	Unix-like	Python 3	?	?	Designed to be extensible for a work IRC network	conversation, search, games	
Ruby-rbot	ruby-rbot	GPL	Unix-like	Ruby	?	?	flexible plugin system	Twitter & RSS feeds, searches, games	
Rubybot	umby24	GPL-3.0	Cross-platform	Ruby	?	2013-10-30 (4.2)	Simple, yet easily extensible.	user-management	
Schongo	Selig, Posiden, Wil	?	Cross-platform	Python 3	?	?	Focus on simplicity, highly extendable module system, rapid development cycle	internet searches	
Shadow	Aaron Blakely	MIT	Cross-platform	Perl	2012-08-31	2022-06-09	Reloadable plugins, channel management, weather info, link metadata fetching, RSS, and more.	multi-purpose, bot framework	
Shocky	Shockah, clone1018	GPL-2.0	Cross-platform	Java	?	?	A Very advanced Java irc bot, that supports all kinds of stuff	user management, factoids, games, karma system	
sircbot	Alpine Linux	GPL-2.0	Unix-like	C (Lua scriptable)	?	2011-12-15	Simple IRC bot for shell and lua scripts	?	wiki
Sopel	dgw, Elsie Powell, Dimitri Molenaars, Elad Alfassa, Ari Koivula	EFLv2	Cross-platform	Python	2012-07-15 (3.0.0)	2020-08-04 (7.0.6)	SSL, (un)loading of plugins at runtime, threaded, user/channel/plugin settings database, Python 3 support. (Formerly Willie; based originally on phenny)	Twitter & other feeds, internet searches, meetingbot, link information	
Tennu	Havvy (Ryan Scheel)	ISC	Cross-platform	JavaScript	2012-03-08 (1.0.0)	2016-06-22 (4.9.0)	Node.js, Plugin architecture, Promise driven	user management	
Ultros	gdude2002 and rakiru	Artistic License 2.0	Cross-platform	Python2	2013-04-08 (Git)	2014-09-25 (1.1.0+ - see commits)	Python IRC bot with an extensible plugin and protocol system, and a package manager. Also supports mumble.	internet searches, games	git
VikingBot	Tor Henning Ueland	GPL-3.0	Unix-like	PHP	?	2013-10-09	Simple PHP based IRC bot with support for secure IRC servers and plugin support	bot stats	
Yauib	Julien Palard	Simplified BSD	Cross-platform	Python	2011-03-22	?	Plugins can be written in any language	takes all pubmsg and priv and tries to match the first word as a command to a directory with exec files and the rest as parameters	

== In popular culture ==
- Basshunter's 2006 song, "Boten Anna", is about a female IRC user mistaken for an IRC bot.

== See also ==
- Chatterbot
- Comparison of Internet Relay Chat bots
