= Thorarinn Gunnarsson =

American novelist

Thorarinn Gunnarsson is the pseudonym of an American author of science fiction and fantasy. For several years, he claimed to be of Icelandic birth but eventually admitted that this (along with much of his biography) was false.

His 1990s novels Make Way For Dragons!, Human, Beware! and Dragons on the Town featured a dragon named Dalvenjah Foxfire for whom DALnet is (indirectly) named. Dragon's Domain appears to take place much earlier in the same continuity, establishing some elements of the setting.

== Bibliography ==
=== Starwolves series ===
1. The Starwolves (January 1988) - ISBN 0-445-21040-0
2. Battle of the Ring (October 1989) - ISBN 0-445-20908-9
3. Tactical Error (April 1991) - ISBN 0-446-36134-8
4. Dreadnought (January 1993) - ISBN 0-446-36322-7

=== Song of the Dwarves series ===
1. Song of the Dwarves (August 1988) - ISBN 0-441-72690-9
2. Revenge of the Valkyrie (August 1989) - ISBN 0-441-72359-4

=== Dragons series ===
1. Make Way for Dragons! (August 1990) - ISBN 0-441-51537-1
2. Human, Beware! (December 1990) - ISBN 0-441-51541-X
3. Dragons on the Town (December 1992) - ISBN 0-441-15526-X
4. Dragon's Domain (July 1993) - ISBN 0-441-16665-2

=== Mystara series ===
1. Dragonlord of Mystara (July 1994) - ISBN 1-56076-906-8
2. Dragonking of Mystara (July 1995) - ISBN 0-7869-0153-5
3. Dragonmage of Mystara (April 1996) ISBN 0-7869-0488-7
