= Libera Chat =

IRC network

- Founded: May 19, 2021; 5 years ago
- Website URL: libera.chat
- Primary DNS: ircs://irc.libera.chat:6697
- Average users: 30,879 (10 July 2025)
- Average channels: 22,713 (10 July 2025)
- Content/subject: Only free and open source software (FOSS) projects are permitted, offtopic discussion allowed in channels starting with "##"

Libera Chat, stylized as Libera.Chat, is an IRC network for free and open-source software projects. Libera Chat prohibits VPN and Tor access for unregistered users. Registration requires a residential IP address and a verified email. It was founded on 19 May 2021 by former Freenode staff members, after Freenode was taken over by Andrew Lee, founder of Private Internet Access.

== History ==
=== Freenode ===
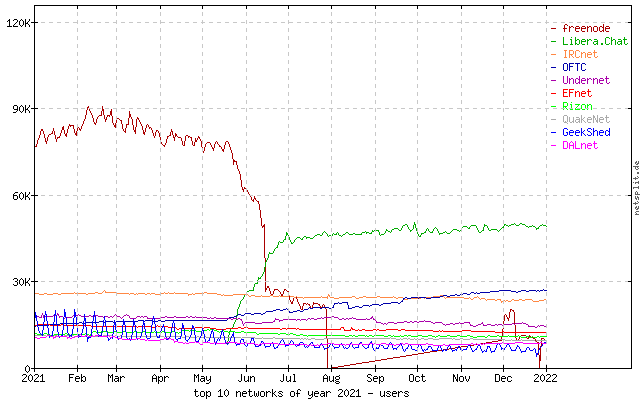
A large proportion of Freenode's users migrated to Libera.Chat, when Freenode's owner changed.

In 2017, Christel Dahlskjaer, then the head of staff at Freenode, incorporated a new company called Freenode Limited and transferred ownership to technology entrepreneur Andrew Lee. In February 2021, Dahlskjaer added the logo of Shells, a company co-founded by Lee, to the Freenode website. Following criticism from staff, Dahlskjaer resigned from the leadership of Freenode, and Freenode staff elected Tom Wesley as the new head of staff. Lee allegedly removed a blog post explaining the leadership changes and, on 11 May, appointed a new person to oversee the Freenode infrastructure. Freenode staff members resigned en masse, and some published statements outlining their view of what happened and claiming that Lee had been applying legal pressure to Wesley.

Lee denied these claims, and said that he had provided Freenode with millions of dollars and was entitled to Freenode's servers as the owner of Freenode Limited. Lee also accused Wesley of harassing Dahlskjaer and of attempting a "hostile takeover."

=== Libera Chat ===
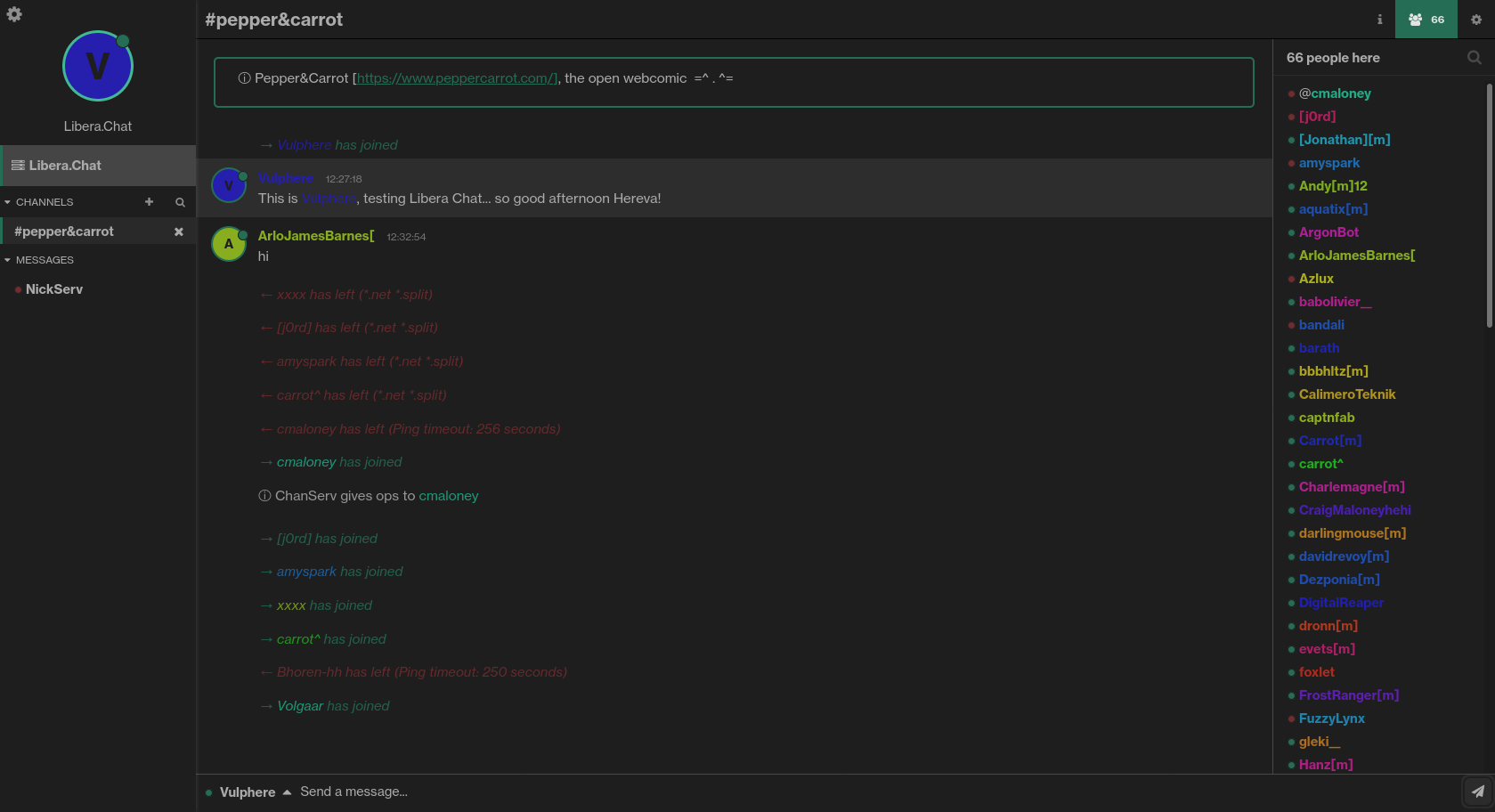
Libera Chat web client (based on KiwiIRC)

After resigning from Freenode, the former staff created Libera Chat on 19 May 2021. They have described the network as a successor to Freenode, which they intend to focus around "free and open source software projects and similarly-spirited collaborative endeavours." Many major projects like FrOSCon, Fedora, Ubuntu, Gentoo, FreeBSD, the Free Software Foundation and Wikimedia have since moved their channels from Freenode to Libera Chat and to other IRC networks.
