= BITNET Relay =

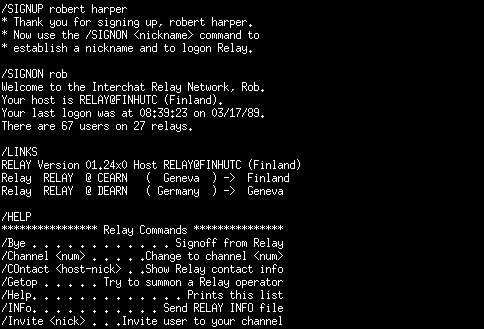
A session showing SIGNUP, SIGNON, LINKS and HELP over BITNET Relay

BITNET Relay, also known as the Inter Chat Relay Network, was a chat network setup over BITNET nodes. It predated Internet Relay Chat and other online chat systems. The program that made the network possible was called "Relay" and was developed by Jeff Kell of the University of Tennessee at Chattanooga in 1985 using the REXX programming language.

This system drew its name from "relay race" which shares a comparable behavior, where messages travel hop-by-hop along the network of Relay servers until they reached their destination. Messages sent within the United States would take a few seconds to reach their destinations, but communication times varied in other countries or internationally. If one or more network links were down, BITNET would store and forward the messages when the network links recovered, minutes or even hours later.

== Background ==
Before BITNET Relay was implemented, any form of communication over BITNET required identifying the remote user and host.

Relay ran on a special ID using several BITNET hosts. To use it, a message was sent to a user ID called RELAY. The Relay program running on that user ID would then provide multi-user chat functions, primarily in the form of "channels" (chat rooms). The message could contain either a command for Relay (preceded by the popular "/" slash character command prefix, still in use today), or a message at the remote host (typically a mainframe computer).

Computers connected to BITNET were generally located at universities and government agencies, due to limited access to computer network bandwidth. It was not uncommon for a university's entire network connection to run over a single leased telephone line or even a 4800 baud dial-up connection. Thus using scarce computing and network resources for "frivolous" purposes, such as chat, was often discouraged.

== Popularity ==
One of the reasons Relay gained acceptance was that its system of peer servers decreased the network bandwidth consumed by group chat, due to no longer having to send multiple copies of the same message individually to each server. Because of this efficiency and the limited bandwidth at the time, users were often not allowed to use or develop alternate chat systems. Experimental chats like Galaxy Network and VM/Shell were asked to shut down before they achieved noteworthy success.

Bitnet Relay gained popularity in the late 1980s when Valdis Kletnieks at Virginia Tech created a Pascal version that consumed far less CPU time, and again in the early 1990s when Smart Relay improved handling of message delivery.

Though Jeff Kell himself had made observations about the possible demise of BITNET Relay, only TCP/IP and the Internet brought about the end of BITNET and Relay. Jarkko Oikarinen, the creator of Internet Relay Chat, says that he was inspired by BITNET Relay

== See also ==
- Relay (disambiguation)
