= EFnet =

IRC network

Eris Free Network
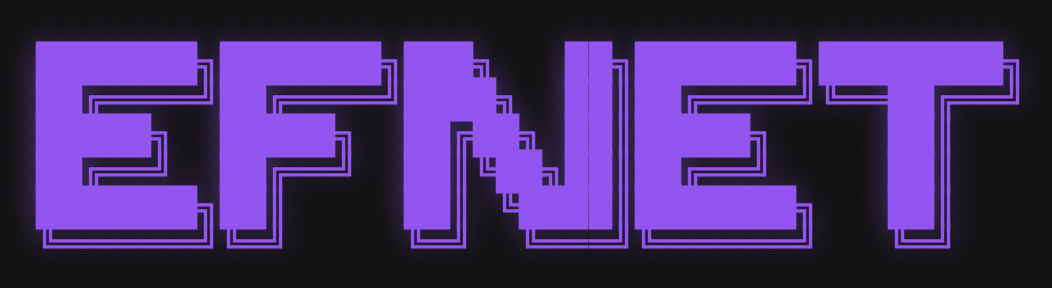
- EFNET IRC Network 35th Anniversary Logo
- Founded: 1990; 36 years ago
- Geographic location: United States, Europe, Canada
- Based in: Worldwide
- Website URL: http://www.efnet.org/
- Primary DNS: irc://irc.efnet.org/
- Average users: 10224 (30 September 2023)
- Average channels: 6437 (30 September 2023)
- Average servers: 60
- Content/subject: Public / unrestricted

EFnet or Eris-Free network is a major Internet Relay Chat (IRC) network, with more than 35,000 users. It is the modern-day descendant of the original IRC network.

== History ==
Initially, most IRC servers formed a single IRC network, to which new servers could join without restriction, but this was soon abused by people who set up servers to sabotage other users, channels, or servers. Restriction grew and, in August 1990, eris.Berkeley.EDU was the last server indiscriminately allowing other servers to join it, Eris being the Greek goddess of strife and discord.

A group of operators, with the support of Jarkko Oikarinen, introduced a new "Q-line" into their server configurations, to "quarantine" themselves away from eris by disconnecting from any subset of the IRC network as soon as they saw eris there.

For a few days, the entire IRC network suffered frequent netsplits, but eventually the majority of servers added the Q-line and effectively created a new separate IRC net called EFnet (Eris-Free Network); the remaining servers which stayed connected to eris (and thus were no longer able to connect to EFnet servers) were called A-net (Anarchy Network). A-net soon vanished, leaving EFnet as the only IRC network.

Continuing problems with performance and abuse eventually led to the rise of another major IRC network, Undernet, which split off in October 1992.

In July 1996, disagreement on policy caused EFnet to break in two: the slightly larger European half (including Australia and Japan) formed IRCnet, while the American servers continued as EFnet. This was known as The Great Split.

In July 2001, after a string of DDoS attacks a service called CHANFIX (originally JUPES) was created, which is designed to give back ops to channels which have lost ops or been taken over.

In 2007, various EFnet servers began implementing SSL.

February 2009 saw the introduction of a new CHANFIX module called OPME, a mechanism for EFnet Admins to use to restore ops in an opless channel. It was proposed by Douglas Boldt to provide a much cleaner alternative to masskill, which was unnecessarily invasive and disruptive to the network.

Later in 2009, some major IRC servers were delinked: irc.vel.net, irc.dks.ca, irc.pte.hu, EFnet's only UK server efnet.demon.co.uk, and EFnet's only UK hub hub.uk, which were sponsored by Demon Internet.

In September 2010, the two western regions of the network (United States and Canada) merged into the North American region. While the North American and European regions are technically independent of each other, today many issues within EFnet are handled at a global level.

On April 1, 2018, as an April Fools' joke, the 1990s IRC server eris.Berkeley.EDU server was resurrected. Some EFnet admins worked with the Open Computing Facility student group at UC Berkeley for months to resurrect the server for April Fools. Only a few EFnet staff were aware of the efforts and the server was linked in via a defunct H:line for the (normally) leaf (client-only) server irc.efnet.nl, bypassing the normal linking procedure. As of 12:30 UTC on April 01 2018, eris.Berkeley.EDU was once again a valid IRC server on the "Eris Free" IRC network and accepted clients. At the same time, efnet.org begin redirecting to erisnet.org. eris.Berkeley.EDU delinked on April 02 2018 at 19:50 UTC.

== Characteristics ==
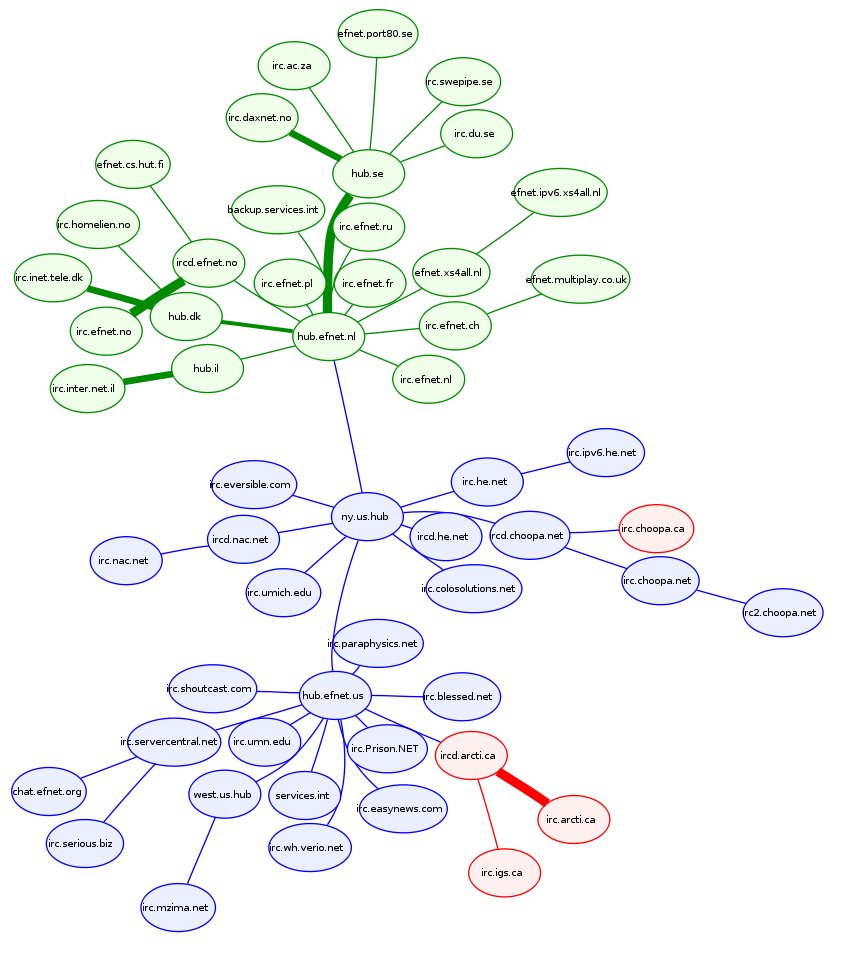
Efnet's server structure as of October 2009 (green = Europe, blue = USA, Red = Canada)

EFnet has large variations in rules and policy between different servers as well as the two major regions (EU and NA). Both have their own policy structure, and each region votes on its own server applications. However, central policies are voted upon by the server admin community which is archived for referencing.

Due to EFnet's nature, it has gained recognition over the years for warez, hackers, and DoS attacks.

EFnet has always been known for its lack of IRC services that other IRC networks support (such as NickServ and ChanServ, although it had a NickServ until April 8, 1994). Instead, the CHANFIX service was introduced to fix "opless" channels.

All servers on EFnet run ircd-ratbox.

EFnet's channel operators are generally free to run their channels however they see fit without the intervention of IRC operators. IRC ops are primarily there to handle network and server related issues, and rarely get involved with channel-level issues.
