= Open Computing Facility =

Student organization at the University of California, Berkeley

The OCF Penguin and logo/mascot since 2012, resembling Tux but sporting a scarf with the UC Berkeley colors of blue and gold.

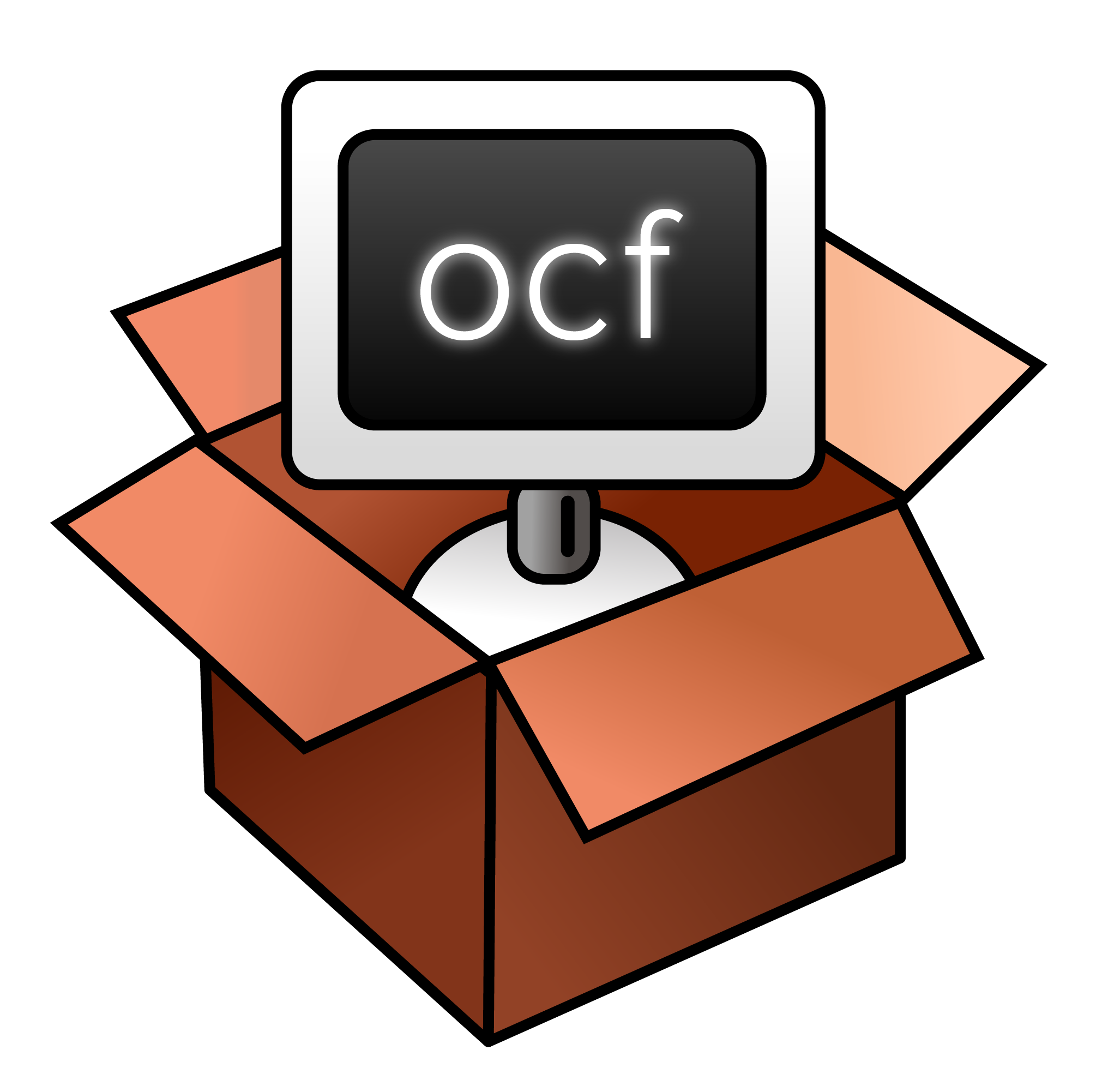
The logo used by the Open Computing Facility from 2006 until 2012.

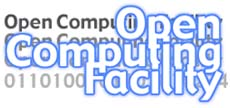
The logo used by the Open Computing Facility from 1999 to 2006.

The Open Computing Facility is a student organization at the University of California, Berkeley, and a chartered program of the ASUC. Founded in 1989, the OCF is an all-volunteer, student-run organization dedicated to providing free and accessible computing resources to all members of the University community.

The mission of the OCF is "to provide an environment where no member of Berkeley's campus community is denied the computer resources he or she seeks, to appeal to all members of the Berkeley campus community with unmet computing needs, and to provide a place for those interested in computing to fully explore that interest."

The OCF provides the following services, among others, to UC Berkeley students, staff, alumni, and affiliates:

- A 30-seat computer lab with Linux workstations, 4K monitors, and mechanical keyboards
- Webhosting for individuals and student groups
- Linux shell access
- Email forwarding
- Free printing quotas for lab users
- Access to a high-performance computing cluster featuring modern NVIDIA GPUs
- Software mirrors of popular Linux distributions and open source projects, available over rsync, http, and https
- A Linux systems administration DeCal

To further the OCF's goal of promoting accessibility, the OCF publishes its board meeting minutes, tech talks, and Unix system administration DeCal materials online for all to see and use.
