= DALnet =

Major IRC network, established 1994

- Founded: 1994; 31 years ago
- Geographic location: United States; Europe; Canada
- Based in: Worldwide
- Website URL: www.dal.net
- Primary DNS: irc.dal.net
- Average users: 7,000–12,000
- Average channels: 7,000–11,000
- Average servers: 40
- Content/subject: Public/Unrestricted
- ASN: 31800

DALnet is an Internet Relay Chat (IRC) network made up of 39 servers, with a stable population of approximately 10,000 users in about 4,000 channels.

DALnet is accessible by connecting with an IRC client to an active DALnet server on ports 6660 through 6669, and 7000. SSL users can connect on port 6697.

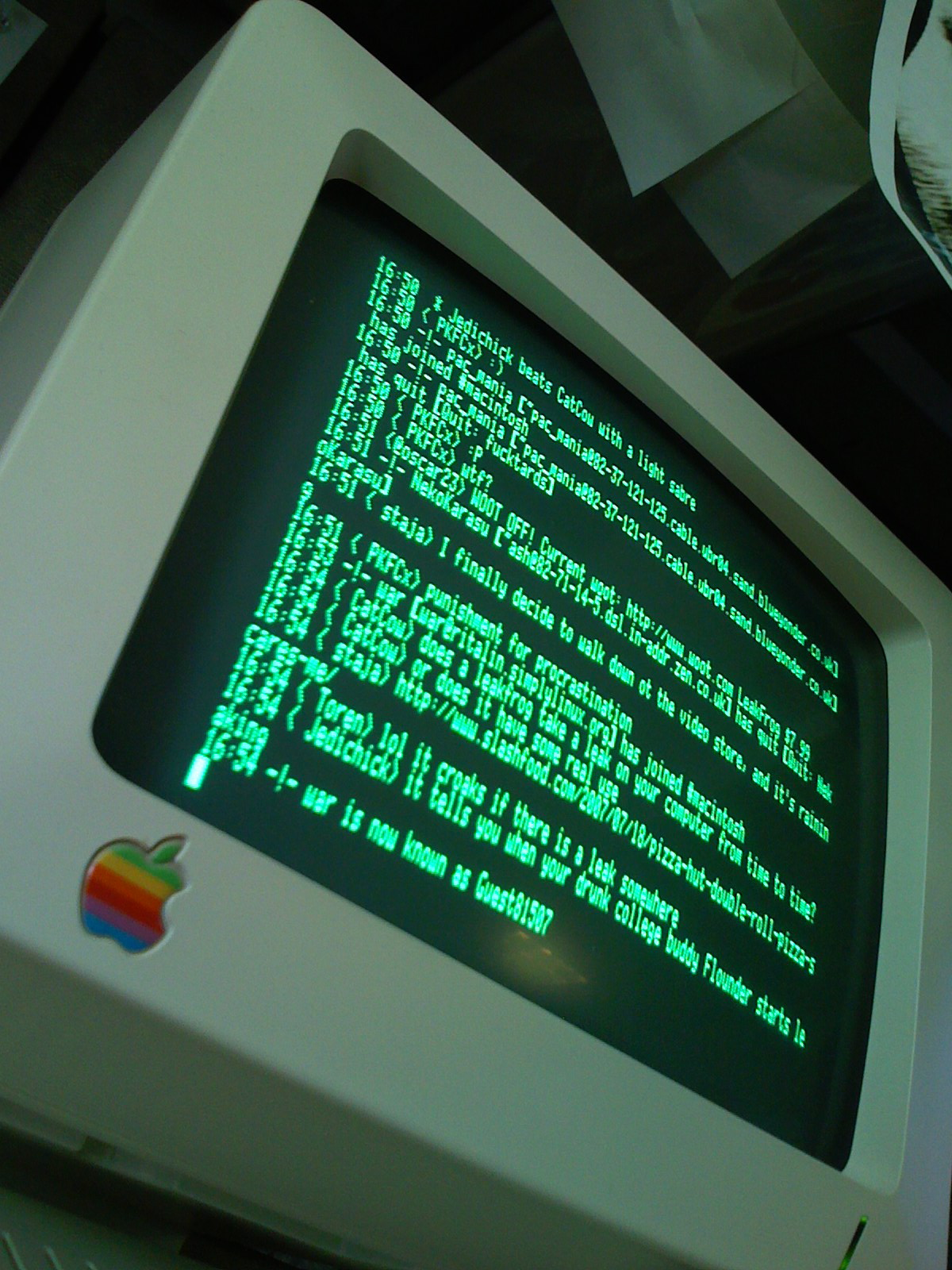
DALnet on an Apple II through irssi

== History ==
DALnet was founded in July 1994 by members of the EFnet #startrek channel. This new network was known as "dal's net", after the nickname used by the administrator of the first IRC server on the network, "dalvenjah", taken from the dragon "Dalvenjah Foxfire", in a fantasy novel by Thorarinn Gunnarsson. The network was soon renamed from dal's net to DALnet.

From 25 users in July 1994, the number of users grew to 1,000 by November 1995, 5,000 by June 1996, 10,000 by December 1996, 50,000 by October 1999, 100,000 in November 2001, and peaked around 142,000 in April 2002.

The network was severely disrupted in late 2002 and early 2003 by distributed denial of service (DDoS) attacks. Added to the DDoS issues was that the owner of twisted.dal.net (the world's largest single IRC server, hosting more than 50,000 clients most of the time) delinked his servers (for personal reasons).

It was around this time that DALnet closed many of its channels that were dedicated to serving content such as MP3 files and movies. File transfers were still allowed but not on a large scale. This raised suspicion as to whether DALnet was being targeted by the Recording Industry Association of America.

In 2003, DALnet put up its first anycast servers under the name "The IX Concept", and made irc.dal.net resolve to the anycast IP. Since then, most new client servers linked are anycast.
