= Open and Free Technology Community =

Internet Relay Chat (IRC) network

- Founded: 2001; 24 years ago
- Geographic location: Europe; North America
- Website URL: www.oftc.net
- Primary DNS: irc.oftc.net
- Average users: 18,100 (June 16, 2021)
- Average channels: 3,600 (June 16, 2021)
- Average servers: 21
- Content/subject: Public/Unrestricted

The Open and Free Technology Community (OFTC) is an IRC network that provides collaboration services to members of the free software community in any part of the world. OFTC is an associated project of Software in the Public Interest, a non-profit organization which was founded to help organizations develop and distribute open hardware and software. As of October 2019, OFTC has 31 volunteer staff members, and 16 sponsors.

== History ==
OFTC was founded at the end of 2001 by a group of experienced members of the open source and free software communities aiming to provide these communities with better communication, development, and support infrastructure. OFTC is ruled by a written constitution and the staff elect the officers among each other using a voting mechanism. OFTC became a member project of Software in the Public Interest (SPI) in July 2002, and SPI became the legal owner of the project's domain names.

The ability for all users to connect using Transport Layer Security was added in April 2016 with the use of SSL certificates from the Let's Encrypt certificate authority.

In 2016, OFTC was bridged to the Matrix instant messaging network.

== Projects ==
OFTC currently develops three projects for its purposes: "oftc-hybrid" (a fork of the Hybrid IRC daemon), "oftc-ircservices" (the IRC services suite), and "oftc-geodns" (a GeoIP DNS responder to handle user distribution across the servers). OFTC uses GitHub repositories to host its codebase and issue tracker. Prospective users of the software can find tarball releases at https://www.oftc.net/releases/, named according to semantic versioning.
