= Jarkko Oikarinen =

Finnish computer scientist

- Born: August 16, 1967 (age 59); Kuusamo, Finland
- Other name: WiZ
- Known for: Internet Relay Chat

Jarkko Oikarinen (born 16 August 1967) is a Finnish IT professional and the inventor of the first Internet chat network, called Internet Relay Chat (IRC), where he is known as WiZ.

== Biography and career ==
Oikarinen was born in Kuusamo. While working at the University of Oulu in August 1988, he wrote the first IRC server and client programs, which he produced to replace the MUT (MultiUser Talk) program on the Finnish BBS OuluBox. Using the Bitnet Relay chat system as inspiration, Oikarinen continued to develop IRC over the next four years, receiving assistance from Darren Reed in co-authoring the IRC Protocol. In 1997, his development of IRC earned Oikarinen a Dvorak Award for Personal Achievement—Outstanding Global Interactive Personal Communications System; in 2005, the Millennium Technology Prize Foundation, a Finnish public-private partnership, honored him with one of three Special Recognition Awards.

He started working for medical image processing in 1990 in Oulu University Hospital, developing research software for a neurosurgical workstation, and between 1993 and 1996 he worked for Elekta in Stockholm, Sweden and Grenoble, France putting the research into commercial products marketed by Elekta. In 1997 he returned to Oulu University Hospital to finish his PhD as Joint Assistant Professor / Research Engineer, receiving the PhD from the University of Oulu in 1999, in areas of computer graphics and medical imaging. During these years he focused on telemedicine, volume rendering, signal processing and computed axial tomography. Once finishing his PhD, he has held the positions of Chief Software Architect of Add2Phone Oy (Helsinki, Finland), Head of R&D in Capricode (Oulu, Finland) and General Manager in Nokia.

He is also partner and chief software architect at an electronic games developer called Numeric Garden (Espoo, Finland).

Oikarinen and his wife, Kaija-Leena, were married in 1996 and have three children: Kasper, Matleena, and Marjaana.

Oikarinen has been working for Google since 2011, initially in Stockholm, Sweden, to work on the Google Hangouts project, and later on to develop its successor, Google Meet. In 2016 he moved to Kirkland, Washington and since 2021 he has again been working in Stockholm.
