= Netsplit =

Phenomenon, particularly on IRC, in which one server becomes disconnected from others

In computer networking, specifically Internet Relay Chat (IRC), netsplit is a disconnection between two servers. A split between any two servers splits the entire network into two pieces.

== Cause and effects ==
Consider the graph to the right, which represents the computer network. Each line represents an established connection. Therefore, the server C is connected directly to A, which is also connected to B and D.

A normally functioning network

A network on which a netsplit has occurred

If a disruption in the connection between C and A occurs, the connection may be terminated as a result. This can occur either by a socket producing an error, or by excessive lag in which the far server A anticipates this case (which is called a timeout).

When the connection between A and C is severed, users who were connected to other servers that are no longer reachable on the network appear to quit. For example, if user Sara is connected to server A, user Bob is connected to server B, and user Joe is connected to C, and C splits, or disconnects, from A, it will appear to Joe as if Sara and Bob both quit (disconnected from the network), and it will appear to both Sara and Bob that Joe quit. However, Joe can still talk to anyone who is connected to the same server (in this case server C). This happens because the servers to which they are connected are informed of the change in the network status, and update their local information accordingly to display the change.

Later, server C may relink (reconnect) to a server (or servers) on the network and the users who appeared to have quit will rejoin; the process of sending this updated information to all servers on the network is called a netburst (or sync).

== Security issues ==
Occasionally, users will attempt to use netsplits to gain access to private channels. A denial-of-service attack can be used to cause a netsplit by overloading an IRC server's network connection or Internet infrastructure between two servers. If none of the channel users were on server C, a user could join a private channel and later gain access when the servers relink. This is commonly known as split riding or riding the split.

Another typical netsplit-oriented IRC attack is Nickname Colliding. In this attack, a user on a split segment of the network would change nicknames to that of a user on the other side of the split network. Upon reconnection, the network would disconnect both users because only one nickname may be in use at one time. Modern IRC server software has largely eliminated this method, but servers using older software may still be vulnerable.

== Appearance ==
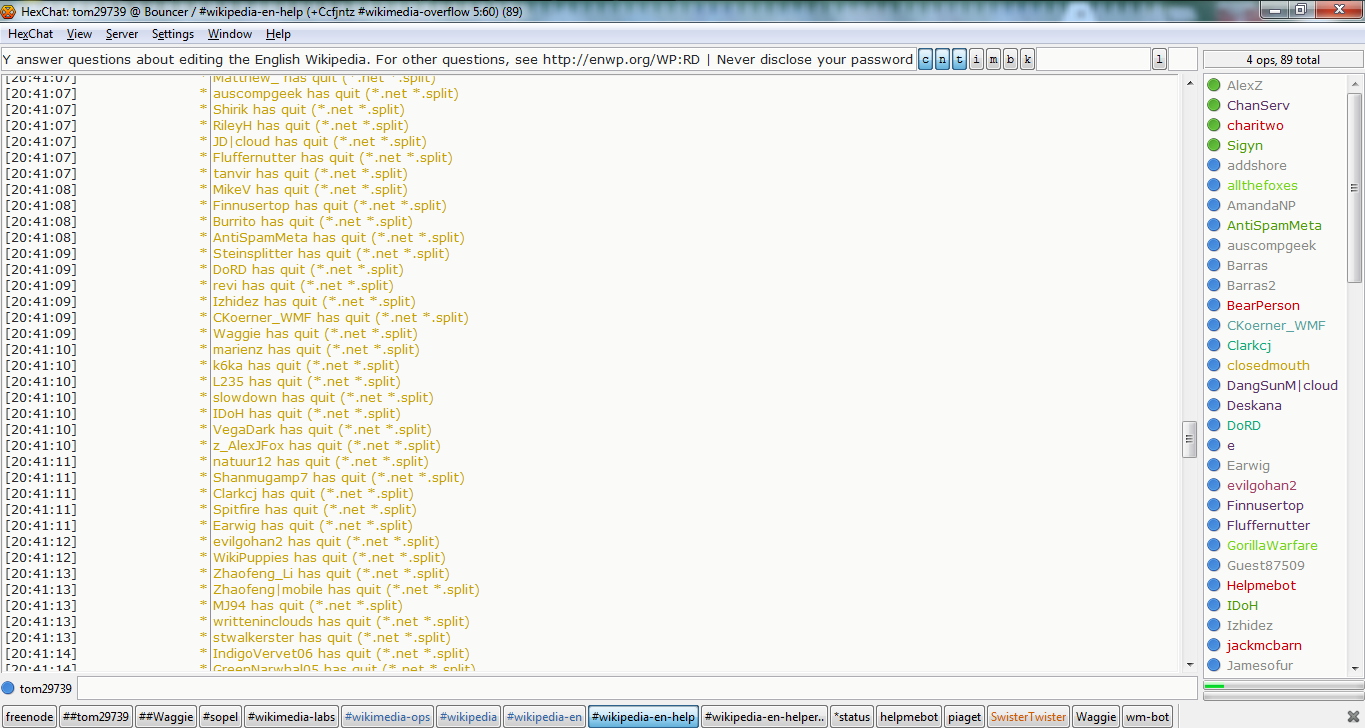
A netsplit on freenode, shown in the HexChat IRC client

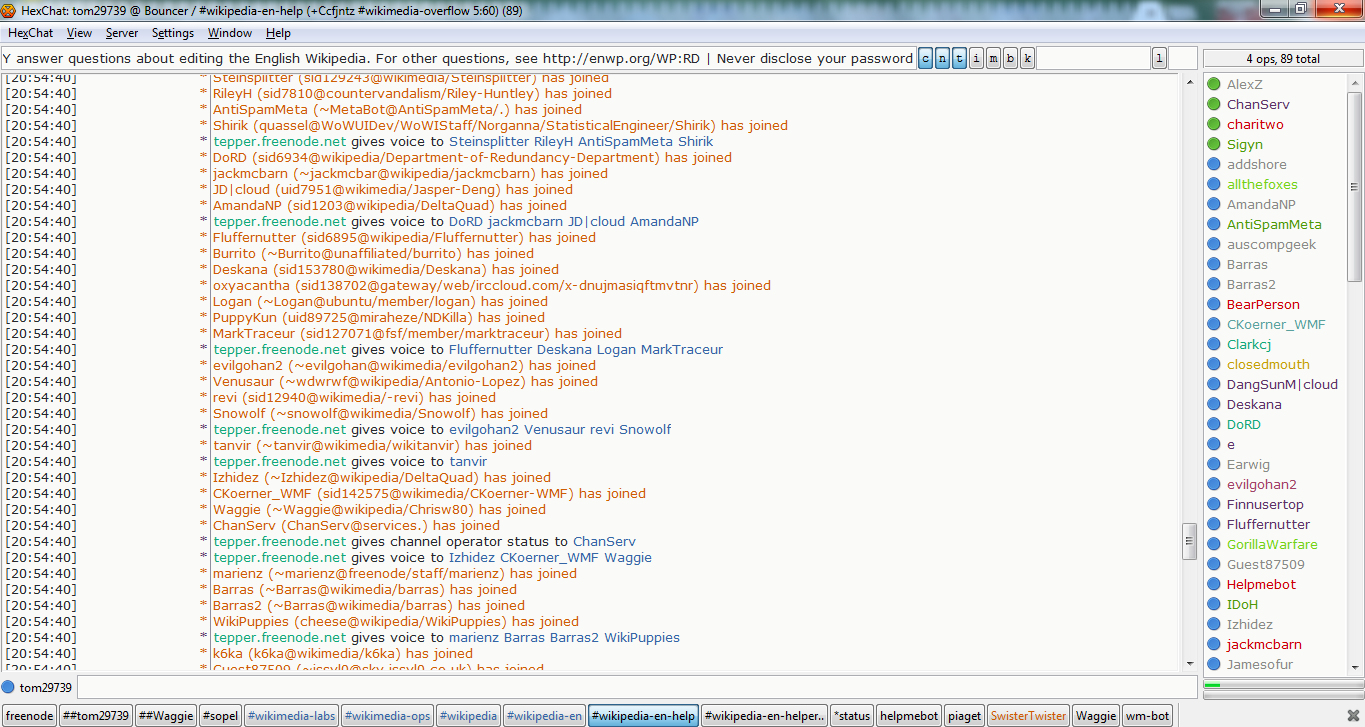
A netburst on freenode, shown in the HexChat IRC client

Below are examples of a typical netsplit. When two servers split, a user sees this as large number of users quitting. After the servers are reconnected, a user sees the other users rejoining.

=== On GUI IRC clients ===
* usera has quit (a.irc.net b.irc.net)
* userb has quit (a.irc.net b.irc.net)
* userc has quit (a.irc.net b.irc.net)
* usera has joined #channel
* userb has joined #channel
* userc has joined #channel

=== On command-line client IRC ===
00:00 -!- Netsplit a.irc.net <-> b.irc.net quits: usera, userb, userc
00:00 -!- Netsplit over, joins: usera, userb, userc

=== To a user on a private network ===
* usera has quit (*.net *.split)
* userb has quit (*.net *.split)
* userc has quit (*.net *.split)
* usera has joined #channel
* userb has joined #channel
* userc has joined #channel
