= List of United Kingdom ISPs by age =

The following is a history of UK Internet service providers (ISPs) in order of the date they started trading.

== United Kingdom ISPs by age ==
1. 1985-6 GreenNet
2. 1990 Pipex
3. 1992-01-28 GEN (established in 1989, began operating as an ISP in 1992)
4. 1992-06-01 Demon Internet
5. 1992 ExNet Initially as 'HelpEx' service
6. 1993 EUnet GB
7. 1992 NTL
8. 1993 Dungeon Network Systems - Rebranded as Flexnet in 1996
9. 1993 Pavilion (Sold to Easynet from 1 January 2001, but e-mail addresses remain extant under the pavilion.net domain)
10. 1994 Bogomip
11. 1994-10-13 Zetnet
12. 1994 Easynet
13. 1994 U-NET
14. 1995 Mailbox Internet
15. 1995 Netdirect (NDO, now part of Namesco)
16. 1995 Internet Central
17. 1995 Anglianet
18. 1995 Power Internet Ltd (Powernet), now part of the Timico Technology Group
19. 1995 Unipalm-Pipex
20. 1995 Zen Internet
21. 1996 Direct Connection
22. 1996 Metronet
23. 1996 Lumison
24. 1996 Simwood
25. 1996 Claranet
26. 1996-11 Entanet
27. 1997 Force 9
28. 1998 Larknet
29. 1998 Freecom
30. 1998 Elite Limited
31. 1998 Freeserve
32. 1999 Barclays launched Barclays.net., which was acquired by British Telecom in 2001.

== See also ==
- Internet in the United Kingdom
- List of broadband providers in the United Kingdom
