= Compupress =

Greek publishing company

Compupress is a Greek publishing company formed in 1982. Originally the company was formed in order to publish computer magazines and books. Following the decline of the computer magazine market, the company expanded to publish fantasy and science fiction, comic books and graphic novels, manga and children's magazines.

== Computer magazines ==
Compupress published the first Greek computer magazine: Computers For All (Computer Για Ολους) - which celebrated its 300th issue in August 2009. In the past the magazine has licensed material from the well-known British magazines Personal Computer World, PC Plus and PC Answers. Having already migrated as an e-magazine to the iPad as well as the Adobe Digital Editions platforms in 2012, the magazine published its final paper issue (#344) in May 2013.

The company also published Pixel, a Greek language home computer magazine during the era of the 8/16-bit micros (ZX81, ZX Spectrum, VIC-20, Commodore 64, Amstrad CPC, Atari ST, Amiga etc.). Pixel was one of the few Greek magazines to have a whole section dedicated to type-in programs. Pixel helped initiate a large number of young Greeks to the computer revolution of the 1980s.

In September 1989, Compupress launched PC Master - similar to Pixel but with a focus on IBM Compatible computing.

In 2007, the company launched Update an annual Business Software Guide aimed at the professional.

== Computer Fairs ==
During the 1980s and 90s, the company organised a number of Consumer Fairs and Trade Shows related to computer technology.

Among the various shows the company organised through the 1980s and 1990s, most prominent were the following:

- The Computer Show
- The DeskTop Publishing Show
- The CAD/CAM Show
- The Multimedia Show
- The Internet Show

== Book Publishing ==
Since the early 1980s, Compupress had sporadically published a number of computer books, however in 1991, the company decided to launch a branch dedicated solely to this function. Thus was Anubis Publishing formed. In addition to Greek translations of previously written books, Anubis also publishes original works.

Anubis has published more than 200 computer books and has diversified into business book publishing. Since the 2000s, Anubis has been publishing translations of well-known science-fiction and fantasy books.

== Television ==
In 1991, Compupress made a deal with ERT (Ellinikí Radiofonía Tileórasi), the Greek National TV (at that time the only existing set of channels, given that there was still no private TV in Greece), through which it acquired the right to produce two 13-episode TV Shows promoting the use of computers and new technology. The first show, (Computers: Tools of the Year 2000) would deal with computers in the office and in everyday life while the second, (The Computer Show) would deal with computer games. Both shows would be fully financed by Compupress which would recuperate the costs by finding the required sponsors amongst the local computer companies.

In 2008, celebrating 25 years of publishing "Computers For All", the magazine distributed videos of the two 17-year-old TV series on the covermounted DVD-ROM.

== CompuLink BBS and the Internet ==
In 1992, Compupress launched CompuLink the largest Bulletin Board System in Greece. Initially CompuLink was just a large SCO UNIX-based BBS running CoSy (the same system used by the British CIX) The CompuLink team developed and/or purchased on-line services for target-groups relating to the various computer magazines the company was publishing. Amongst its services was a full-text searching facility for a large number of Greek magazines (apart from Compupress' own), a number of on-line games (most notably Air Warrior and Federation II), an online database with scientific and business news, online access to a daily newspaper custom-made according to each users' preferences etc.

CompuLink was initially designed as an Athens-based system with approximately 100 local telephone lines and (for that time period) state-of-the-art modems at 2,400 - 9,600 baud. The BBS was successful enough to add local PoPs to other regions of Greece, and renamed itself the CompuLink Network.

In April 1994, CompuLink Network became the first Greek commercial dial-up Internet provider. This area however proved to be extremely competitive as, in the following years, a number of major players (Otenet, FORTHnet etc.) entered the market. In 1999, Compupress decided to exit the Internet provider arena and sold CompuLink Network to a group of investors. A few years later the fledgling company declared bankruptcy.

== Digital Content ==
In 2000, Compupress launched a new branch under the name of Digital Content (or DigiCon as it came to be known) in order to have an active presence in the area of web development and on-line services. Through this branch Compupress managed the web sites of its own magazines as well as a number of other web services.

Amongst the services DigiCon developed and/or acquired were the following:

- On-line games: The 4th Coming (T4C)
- Auction sites: eBazaar
- e-book publishing: e-bookshop
- Content sites: GameWeb, CompuWeb

Following the burst of the dot-com bubble, DigiCon became temporarily dormant, limiting its activity to the maintenance of the company's existing web sites. In 2008 Digital Content launched two new ad-driven content web sites: Pulp.gr, aiming at the pop-culture aficionado, and PCMaster.gr, a new and revamped site for the magazine's readers. In 2001, DigiCon launched e-bookshop.gr an e-book publishing site. Towards the end of 2015, following the folding of their last technology magazine, the company launched techzoom.gr soon to be followed by tour-market.gr, two sites dealing respectively in the technology and tourism industries.

=== Business and trade magazines ===
In the mid-eighties, the company created a branch named Business Press through which it published magazines in the business area. Amongst these most prominent were Information and Today's Enterprise (Σύγχρονη Επιχείρηση), two publications that urged the Greek companies of that period to abandon older concepts and enter the informatics era. Both magazines did quite well for a few years but eventually folded during the early nineties.

In 1989, Compupress published Touristiki Agora (Τουριστική Αγορά), a trade monthly in the area of the Greek tourism industry. Touristiki Agora currently publishes Meet In Greece which is the only English-language Conference Guide currently published in Greece.

In 2001, the company launched Food Service, a trade monthly for the Food & Beverage market.

=== Science magazines ===
In the mid-nineties, Compupress launched Millennium a science monthly that licensed material from Discover magazine. It proved financially unviable and folded two years later.

=== Consumer technology magazines ===
In 2003, the company launched Digital Living, a monthly magazine licensing material from Future Publishing's Digital Home and Hi-Fi Choice and having a well known movie as a covermount DVD. Initially the magazine was successful, but in less than two years declining circulation forced it to fold.

In November 2005, Compupress launched Mobile Magazine aimed at the mobile telephone users. By early 2006, the magazine had been incorporated as a supplement to Computers For All.

In November 2005, the company also launched Play-On! a cross-console monthly for the video-games market which proved to be extremely short-lived.

=== Puzzle & crossword magazines ===
In the summer of 2005, Compupress launched the first Greek Sudoku puzzle magazine. Since then it has followed-up with a weekly, two biweeklies, as well as a couple of bimonthlies.

In 2007, the company entered the local crossword magazine market launching the weekly Lytis (Λύτης) which proved to be extremely short-lived. In 2010 Compupress returned to the cross-word market, launching a new weekly crossword magazine, a biweekly, three monthlies and three bimonthlies.

=== Military history magazines ===
In 2006, Compupress launched World Military History (Παγκόσμια Πολεμική Ιστορία) entering the -already crowded- Greek military history magazine arena. The initial success of the magazine created a series of special editions carrying DVDs concerning various military subjects.

In 2008, responding to declining sales the magazine folded, however the thematic military "monographs" are still being published on a quasi-regular basis.

=== Fantasy and science fiction ===
During the late nineties, Anubis, the company's book-publishing branch, turned to translating fantasy and science-fiction best-sellers in order to compensate for the declining computer-book sales figures. In the next few years the company gradually shifted its production from computer and business-related titles to fantasy and science-fiction. Amongst the authors that Anubis has introduced to the Greek public are Frank Herbert (Dune series), George R. R. Martin (A Song of Ice and Fire series), Terry Brooks (Shannara series), Guy Gavriel Kay (The Fionavar Tapestry, Tigana, A Song for Arbonne, The Lions of Al-Rassan, The Sarantine Mosaic), Terry Goodkind (Sword of Truth series), Robin Hobb (The Farseer trilogy, The Liveship Traders trilogy), David Gemmell (Drenai and Rigante series), Joe Abercrombie (The First Law trilogy). In addition, Anubis has also published more than 80 books of the classic RPG Dragonlance and Forgotten Realms series licensed from Wizards of the Coast, a number of Warhammer novels licensed from Black Library, as well as a dozen Warcraft and StarCraft novels licensed from Blizzard Entertainment.

In 2002, Compupress launched CineFan a monthly dedicated to fantasy and science-fiction film fans. This magazine also carried a well known movie from this genre as a DVD covermount. Similar to Digital Living CineFan was also canceled after a few years.

In 2009, the company launched a Greek version of Asimov's Science Fiction magazine.

=== Comics and comics magazines ===
In 2005, Anubis Comics was created and formed a number of licensing agreements with DC Comics, Marvel Comics, Dark Horse Comics and other major comic book publishers. Consequently, since 2005 Compupress has published a number of well-known comic book series, such as Batman, Superman, Ultimate Spider-Man, several X-Men titles, Conan the Barbarian, Star Wars and Indiana Jones.

In June 2006, Anubis Comics launched Fantasy Heroes, a monthly magazine dedicated to the fantasy genre, serializing several fantasy series, such as the Dark Elf Trilogy G.R.R.Martin's The Hedge Knight, and Raymond Feist's Magician. In February 2009 the magazine ceased publication with its 33rd issue, citing the global financial turmoil as one reason for dwindling sales.

=== Graphic novels ===
Since 2005, Anubis Comics has published a number of previously written graphic novels, including Alan Moore's V for Vendetta and Watchmen, Frank Miller's The Dark Knight Returns, Neil Gaiman's The Sandman: Endless Nights, G.R.R.Martin's The Hedge Knight, Superman: Birthright, Batman: Hush, Ultimate Iron Man, as well as a number of classic B&W Conan the Barbarian graphic novels.

In May 2008, Anubis published 1453, its first original Greek graphic novel dealing with the fall of Constantinople. (Story by Orestes Manousos - Art by Nikos Pagonis). The publication coincided with the 555th anniversary of the fall of the Byzantine Empire.

=== Manga ===
In 2006, the company formed the Anubis Manga branch which launched AkaSuki the first shōjo manga monthly to be published in Greece, as well as Manga No Sekai, an introductory edition covering the basics of Japanese manga products and terminology.

Anubis Manga licenses titles from Hakusensha (such as Berserk and Fruits Basket), Kodansha (such as Love Hina and Blade of the Immortal), Shueisha (such as Naruto and Bleach), and Tokyopop (such as Princess Ai and various Warcraft and StarCraft titles).

=== Kids' Magazines ===
2009 saw the launching of Anubis junior, a new branch of the company catering to the children and preteen market through a number of new magazines, some of which were licensed and some were designed by Compupress.

The imprint publishes titles such as, Gormiti, Transformers, and titles based on licensed toys, superheroes and cartoons, such as Ben 10, Bakugan, Playmobil, Batman: Brave and the Bold, Looney Tunes, Scooby-Doo, Winx Club and Patito Feo, an Argentinean teen comedy TV series, as well as other major children's brand names.

== Key titles ==
Key magazine titles published by Compupress include:

- Computer Για όλους (Computers For All)
- Update
- PC Master
- PC Master Gold
- Τουριστική Αγορά (Tourism Market)
- Hotel Suppliers' Guide
- Meet In Greece
- Food Service
- Food Service Guide
- Wine Review
- Best Su-Doku
- Su-Doku Pocket
- Su-Doku Gold
- Military Monographs
- K[2]
- Winx
- Pixie mag
- Gormiti Magazine
- Marvel Heroes
- Bakugan
- Ben 10
- Playmobil Magazine
- Scooby-Doo
- Looney Tunes
- Batman Brave & Bold
- Patty
- Maya Fox
- Dinosaur King
- Tom & Jerry

== Key websites ==
Key online sites published by Compupress include:

- Compupress Company site
- e-Compupress Magazines' Digital Editions
- e-Bookshop e-books for sale
- Anubis e-shop Paper books, graphic novels and manga for sale
- Pulp Pop culture news
- PC Master The magazine's fan site
- Update Guide The Annual Guide's database site

=== Popular defunct titles ===
- Pixel
- Pixel junior
- Super Pixel
- Hardware & Robotics
- Compu-Data
- Information
- Σύγχρονη Επιχείρηση (Today's Enterprise)
- CAD/CAM & Graphics
- Συνεδριακή Αγορά (Conference Market)
- The European Gazette
- Πληροφορική Εβδομάδα (Informatics weekly)
- Superstar
- Βιβλίο & Media (Books & Media)
- Millennium
- Space
- 2001 – X File
- Fantastic!
- Pixel Next Generation
- Multimedia & CD-ROM
- Κόσμος του Internet (World of Internet)
- Tech Business
- E-Market
- Digital Living
- CineFan
- PC Master Hot Games
- Power Gamer
- Mobile Magazine
- Play-on!
- Lytis
- Lys
- Caramela
- World Military History
- TV Maniax
- Fantasy Heroes
- Power Kids
- Computer Music
- Asimov's Science-Fiction
- Linux Format
- Linux Inside
- Digital Camera
- ADSL Guide
- GPS Guide
- Laptop Guide
- PC Master Top Games
- PC Master Super Games
- Free Gamer
- WoW Guide
- e-Kids
- Transformers
