= CIX (website) =

Online conferencing service

CIX Online Ltd.
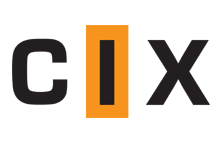
- Type: Limited company
- Industry: Internet; Conferencing; Social media
- Founded: 1987
- Headquarters: Croydon, UK
- Area served: Worldwide
- Website: www.cix.co.uk

CIX (originally Compulink Information eXchange) is an online conferencing service developed by CIX Online Ltd. Founded in 1983 as a FidoNet bulletin board system, it is one of the oldest British Internet service providers.

== History ==
=== Origins ===
Founded in 1983 by Frank and Sylvia Thornley, it began as a FidoNet bulletin board system but was relaunched commercially as CIX in 1987. At the core of the service were thousands of "conferences" — groups created by users to discuss specific topics. These were conceptually similar to newsgroups but limited to CIX subscribers, who sometimes refer to themselves as "Cixen". These conferences still exist today, although the CIX service has since expanded to include many additional features. The service is funded through a monthly subscription fee rather than advertising.

In 1988, CIX provided the first commercial internet email and Usenet access in the UK. The service grew rapidly, reaching a peak of over 16,000 users in 1994, before starting to lose customers to newly established internet service providers that offered free access to the mass market using 0845 dial-up. These included providers such as Demon (founded by Cixen Cliff Stanford, whose CIX nickname was "Demon"), Pipex, AOL, and Freeserve. By 2011, CIX still had nearly 9,000 users.

In its heyday, CIX was one of the UK's premier online platforms for both technical and social interaction. It hosted several official online support areas for companies such as Borland and Novell and counted many of the UK's technology journalists among its subscribers (some of whom were provided with free accounts), ensuring regular mentions in the computing press.

The Liberal Democrats have used CIX as a conferencing system, with a branded version of the offline reader Ameol provided for their use.

=== Later company history ===
In 1996, the Thornleys decided to expand CIX's services to include full 0845 dial-up internet access, branded as CIX Internet. However, uptake was limited, possibly due to its above-average cost, despite being technically rated for many years as one of the best internet providers in the UK.

In March 1998, a management buy-in backed by Legal & General Ventures was successfully completed. The buy-in team, none of whom had previously worked at CIX, included Doug Birtley as Managing Director, Niels Gotfredsen as Finance Director, Graham Davies as Sales and Marketing Director, and Lisa Pennington. Frank and Sylvia Thornley agreed to remain with the company for a minimum of three years.

In 2000, CIX was sold to Telenor, a Norwegian telecommunications company. It was rebranded and merged with XTML of Manchester and Norsk Data of Newbury to form the UK arm of Nextra, Telenor's internet subsidiary in the UK.

In June 2002, Telenor outsourced the CIX service to Parkglobe, a company established specifically for this purpose by several long-term CIX staff and directors, including Graham Davies, Charlie Brook, and Mat Sims.

In July 2002, Telenor sold the business to GX Networks, also known as PIPEX.

In February 2001, CIX WCS (Web Conferencing System) was released as a private beta to a select group, followed by a public beta in May 2001.

In 2004, CIX Conferencing was made accessible via a new service, CIX Online, by CIX Online Ltd, providing a web interface as an alternative to the text interface. However, customer acceptance of the web interface was limited compared to the OLRs (Offline Readers — which allowed the upload and download of new messages with message editing performed offline) that most Cixen used.

In April 2007, the first prototype of the CIX Forums website was launched by CIX Online Ltd. This new online method of accessing content was designed to attract more users.

In September 2008, Graham Davies of CIX Online Ltd announced that the API behind CIX Forums would be made available in October 2008, allowing interested parties to create additional user add-ons.

On 25 May 2011, CIX Online Ltd was purchased by ICUK, an ISP, hosting, and telecoms provider formed in November 2001 by a former employee of Compulink Information eXchange Ltd. In its press release, ICUK stated its intention to grow and expand CIX Conferencing for both new and existing users of the two companies.

In April 2012, version 2 of CIX Forums was released. This version included numerous bug fixes, enhancements, speed optimisations, and an improved user interface.

In July 2012, version 3 of CIX Forums was released, featuring further design improvements and a new notification system that allowed users to receive instant replies to messages posted.

== Technical information ==
CIX Conferencing is based on the CoSy Conferencing System, although it has been heavily modified by generations of staff to add new features. The CoSy conferencing system used by CIX was initially run on a UNIX server.

At first, users read the text-based (ISO 8859-1) CIX messages online, but the UK's practice of charging per minute for telephone calls led to the development of offline readers (OLRs). The first CIX OLR was TelePathy for MS-DOS, which evolved into the first Windows OLR, WigWam. The first official Windows OLR for CIX was Ameol, which stands for A Most Excellent Off-Line Reader. It handles email, CIX conferencing, and Usenet, and is still freely available. It was written by Steve Palmer in 1994. The official desktop client is now CIXReader, which also runs on macOS, and is freely available to subscribers. Many other OLR sare available for other operating systems, such as Nicola for the Amiga and Polar for Psion PDAs. Augur is an open-source OLR designed for CIX.

In 1996, it was decided to port the system to Sun hardware and upgrade the bank of modems. ISDN dial-up access and the ability to use the internet to blink (a term used to collect messages) were also introduced.

== See also ==
- WELL - Still-active US precursor of CIX
- BIX - the Byte Information eXchange
