= List of broadband providers in the United Kingdom =

Broadband providers in the UK

This list comprises some of the broadband providers in the United Kingdom that are members of the Internet Service Providers Association (ISPA). In addition to ISPA, data from ISPreview, one of the UK's largest and longest running media outlets focussed on telecommunications news, is also used.

== List ==
Information in the list is accurate as of 14 February 2024.

Name	Website	Underlying network	S	Notes
Andrews & Arnold	www.aa.net.uk	CityFibre; Openreach		Started using CityFibre in addition to Openreach in November 2022.
YouFibre (formerly BRSK)	www.youfibre.co.uk	YouFibre		Network covers premises in the North West and West Midlands.
B4RN	b4rn.org.uk	B4RN		
BT	bt.com	Openreach		Part of the BT Group.
EE	ee.co.uk	Openreach		Part of the BT Group.
PlusNet	plus.net	Openreach		Part of the BT Group.
Community Fibre	communityfibre.co.uk	Community Fibre		
Connect Fibre	Connectfibre.co.uk			
Cuckoo	Cuckoo.co	CityFibre; Giganet; Jurassic Fibre; Swish Fibre		
Exascale	Exascale	Exascale; CityFibre; Gigaclear; Openreach; ITS		
File Sanctuary	filesanctuary.net	CityFibre; Openreach		Started offering CityFibre in 2024, in addition to its existing Openreach offerings.
Freeola	freeola.com	Openreach CitfyFibre Freedom Fibre Trooli MS3		
GEN	gen.uk	Openreach Virgin & others		B2B Only
GoFibre	gofibre.co.uk	GoFibre		GoFibre is a full fibre broadband provider building infrastructure to connect rural areas in Scotland and northern England with internet.
Grain Connect	grainconnect.com	Grain Connect		
Green Co	Green Co	Green Co		Fareham, Gosport, Portsmouth, Chichester
Hyperoptic	hyperoptic.com	Hyperoptic		
KCOM	www.kcom.com	KCOM		For historical reasons, the Hull area has no BT landlines, and the vast majority of residents and most businesses in Hull, Cottingham and Beverley are served only with telecoms services by KCOM.
Lit Fibre	litfibre.com	Lit Fibre		Network covers premises in Wiltshire, Gloucestershire, Hertfordshire, Suffolk, Worcestershire and Essex.
Ogi	ogi.wales	Ogi		Wales' leading altnet provider, aiming to connect welsh towns and villages to ultrafast broadband.
Sky	sky.com	CityFibre; Openreach		Subsidiary of Comcast.
TalkTalk	talktalk.co.uk	CityFibre; Community Fibre; Freedom Fibre; Openreach		TalkTalk started using CityFibre as a primary network provider for its business division in May 2023.
toob	toob.co.uk	toob: CityFibre		
uno	uno.uk	Openreach CityFibre		
UtilityWarehouse	uw.co.uk	CityFibre; Openreach		
Virgin Media	virginmedia.com	Virgin Media; Nexfibre		Subsidiary of Virgin Media O2.
Vodafone	vodafone.co.uk	CityFibre; Openreach		Subsidiary of the Vodafone Group.
Vorboss	vorboss.com	Openreach		Full-fibre broadband network operator in London.
WightFibre	wightfibre.com	WightFibre		Full fibre network operator on the Isle of Wight.
YouFibre	youfibre.com	Netomnia		
XLN Business Broadband	xln.co.uk	CityFibre; Openreach		
Zen Internet	zen.co.uk	CityFibre; Openreach; Freedom Fibre; Trooli; ITS		

== See also ==
- List of mobile operators in the United Kingdom
- Broadband in Northern Ireland
- Internet in the United Kingdom
- List of United Kingdom ISPs by age
- Telecommunications in the United Kingdom
