= Energis =

Telecommunications company

Energis Communications Limited
- Type: Private
- Industry: Telecommunication
- Founded: 18 July 1991 (35 years ago)
- Defunct: 11 November 2005
- Fate: Taken over by Cable & Wireless
- Headquarters: Reading, Berkshire; Leeds, West Yorkshire
- Key people: Gordon Owen (Chairman); Mike Grabiner (Chief executive officer)
- Products: Various, including IPLC
- Revenue: ▲£361 million (2006)
- Website: energis.co.uk at the Wayback Machine (archived 2004-03-25)

Other logo of Energis

Energis Communications Limited, briefly Telecom Electric, was a telecommunication company based in the United Kingdom and Ireland. The company was once a constituent of the FTSE 100 Index, but subsequently went into administration, and then became a subsidiary of Cable & Wireless, in turn acquired by Vodafone.

== History ==
The company was formed in July 1991, as Telecom Electric by way of a demerger from the United Kingdom's National Grid Company. Its national optical fibre network was partially deployed via the overhead power transmission network of the grid. The company was first listed on the London Stock Exchange, and the NASDAQ, in October 1997.

Energis acquired a number of companies in the United Kingdom and Europe, including Planet Online, ISION AG and others. At one point its Market capitalization was over £10 billion making it one of the largest companies by market capital. However, in the process the company over extended itself with borrowings to fund these acquisitions.

Planet Online, by then a subsidiary of Energis, worked with its new parent to help Dixons launch the Freeserve ISP. Energis provided the telephony services and Planet Online provided the e-mail, Internet access etc.

Following the 2001 telecoms crash, Energis plc was placed in administration in July 2002, with its operations in the United Kingdom immediately being transferred to Energis Communications Ltd, a wholly owned subsidiary of a new holding company owned by the banks, and known as Chelys. Archie Norman was hired as chairman to revive the business.

In November 2002 the Ision parts of the energis group were sold onto NDO with the remainder, mostly made up of Planet Online continued as Energis Communications Ltd until August 2005. Cable & Wireless then made an offer to acquire the company for £594 million.

The bid was accepted by a binding majority of Energis debt holders, and the company became part of Cable & Wireless on 11 November 2005.

== Operations ==
In its final form, Energis provided a number of services based around its core platforms of ISP, transmission, IP networking (Energis had a Nortel SDH network with Internet access provided via Cisco routers using MPLS technology), contact centre solutions and voice (traditional switched telephony).

Energis provided services to a number of businesses, a few of the more interesting were:

- Provided Fujitsu Services with a broad outsource for the Post Office Ltd branch and central network services.
- Provided the BBC (in partnership with Arqiva) with its distribution network for television and radio programmes using via ATM.
- Provided service to support The AA and RAC helpline numbers.
- Provided Trinity Mirror with an ATM based network for its editorial to printing process.
- Provided network services to support the Wanadoo United Kingdom Internet service provider offering.

== Senior management ==
Energis was led by a number of chief executive officers during its existence.

- Mar 1993 – Dec 1995: David Dey
- Dec 1995 – Aug 2001: Mike Grabiner
- Aug 2001 – Jul 2002: David Wickham
- Jul 2002 – November 2005: John Pluthero
