= NLZ =

NLZ can refer to:

- Neue Luzerner Zeitung
- Noise Level Zero, a successor of the Byte Information Exchange
- Number of leading zeros, see Find first set
