= Cliff Stanford =

English businessman (1954–2022)

- Born: 12 October 1954; London, England
- Died: 24 February 2022 (aged 67); Estonia

Clifford Martin Stanford (born Spiegel; 12 October 1954 – 24 February 2022) was a British internet entrepreneur from Southend-on-Sea, and the co-founder of Demon Internet, the first Internet service provider in the United Kingdom for individual subscribers.

== Early life ==
Stanford was born on 12 October 1954 and grew up in Southend-on-Sea, Essex. His father was a civil servant, but left the family when Stanford was 11; his mother was a book-keeper.

By the time he was 14, Stanford was beginning to show a flair for business. He devised a marketing scheme to win a newspaper sales competition at his part-time job. He had learned book-keeping by helping his mother with her work and left school, aged 16, to join an accountancy firm.

== Career ==
=== Demon Internet ===
In the early 1990s Pipex began marketing leased line internet connections for £10,000 a year. After recruiting 200 subscribers willing to pay a "tenner a month" for dial-up internet access, in 1992 Stanford co-founded Demon Internet, the first Internet service provider in the United Kingdom for individual subscribers.

Based in Finchley, north London, and initially equipped with eight modems and a single leased line, the company grew quickly, particularly after the appearance of the World Wide Web in 1993. By 1996 Demon Internet had 50,000 subscribers and more than 4,000 modems.

=== Redbus Investments ===
Following the sale of Demon Internet to Scottish Telecom in 1998 for £66 million, Stanford founded Redbus Investments, a venture capital firm involved in film production and a variety of other ventures. Redbus Investments provided seed capital for a number of investments including Redbus Interhouse and Redbus Film Distribution. After a boardroom fall-out at Redbus Interhouse, he resigned in June 2002.

In 2003, whilst attempting to gather information about possible wrongdoings by the board of Redbus Interhouse, Stanford discovered and exposed more than £34m of assets of Dame Shirley Porter. This resulted directly in her repaying £12m to Westminster Council.

In September 2005 Stanford was convicted under the Regulation of Investigatory Powers Act 2000 of intercepting emails belonging to John Porter, son of Dame Shirley and then chairman of Redbus. Despite pleading guilty, Stanford claimed that what he had done was legal as "someone on the inside ... put in a redirect". He was given a suspended sentence, ordered to pay a fine of £20,000 and, in a later hearing, was denied leave to appeal.

== Personal life ==
Stanford had a son, Tony, and from 2000 was in a relationship with Sylvia Spruck Wrigley.

Stanford died from pancreatic cancer in Estonia, on 24 February 2022, at the age of 67.

=== Chess ===
Stanford was a chess enthusiast. He sponsored a Redbus knockout Grandmaster chess event each Easter in Southend since 1999. Following the death of his uncle, Jack Spiegel, who had for many years organised the annual Southend Easter chess congress, Stanford inaugurated a Jack Spiegel Memorial Invitational Tournament, also at Easter and in Southend. The first Redbus event and the first Spiegel Memorial event were each won by James Plaskett.
