= JAM IP =

UK call-centre services company

- Type: Subsidiary
- Industry: Contact centre services, self-service
- Founded: 2007 [merging of OpenSOLUTIONS (formerly Kingston Voiceware) (1997) and JAM IP Ltd (2004)]
- Headquarters: Maidenhead and Kingston upon Hull, England
- Key people: Mark Pritchard, Adrian Mccann, John Kinghorn
- Parent: KCOM Group
- Website: www.jamip.co.uk

JAM IP was a UK contact centre services organisation specialising in consulting, professional services, software development, systems integration and managed services. It trades independently within the KCOM Group of companies. Its main office was based in Maidenhead, Berkshire, with an office in Hull, East Riding of Yorkshire.

JAM IP developed and consulted on applications for IP contact centre management, such as text-to-speech, voice authentication, self-serve applications, and speech recognition.

== History ==
JAM IP Ltd was formed on 1 September 2004 and founded by Mark Pritchard, Adrian Mccann and John Kinghorn, following a management buyout of the Convergence Solutions Business Unit of OAO Technology Solutions Ltd. Their aim was to transform how organisations engage with their customers.

On 18 December 2006, Kingston Communications announced it had acquired JAM IP Ltd to complement its Affiniti enterprise reselling and consultancy business.

The former JAM IP Ltd was merged with Affiniti's Contact Centre Solutions Group and OpenSOLUTIONS team in to form a new combined business: JAM IP. This new business was launched on 1 October 2007.

The current company delivers computer telephony integration (CTI) products into mission-critical environments, such as emergency call centres.

In June 2008, JAM IP announced that Chris Prophet, formerly the manager of Nortel's UK Contact Centre sales team, had joined JAM IP as its Affiniti Channel Sales Director.

== JAM IP's partners ==
- Cisco: Advanced Technology Partner
- Nortel: Gold Partner and Development Partner
- Verint Systems: Strategic Partner
