= Paul Sykes (businessman) =

English businessman (b.1943)

- Born: 30 May 1943 (age 83); Barnsley, England
- Occupation: Businessman
- Website: paul-sykes.com

Paul Sykes (born 30 May 1943) is an English businessman and political donor. He opposed Britain's membership of the European Union and has donated to the UK Independence Party. He had previously supported the Conservative Party, but disagreed with its support of the Maastricht Treaty.

== Business ==
Born in Barnsley on Sunday, 30 May 1943, Sykes was the son of coal miner Edmund Sykes. He failed his eleven-plus in 1954 and went to the Racecommon Road Secondary Modern, Barnsley, leaving school four years later with no qualifications. He had various manual jobs, working largely as a tyre fitter before setting up a business at the age of 18 to dismantle old buses and sell their engines to the Far East for use in fishing boats. He later dealt in buses, coaches and trucks across northern England. Sykes developed industrial, office and warehouse properties first in London Docklands and later Wakefield, Salford, Leeds and Rotherham. He built Meadowhall, then the country's biggest shopping centre. In 1999, Sykes sold Meadowhall for £1.17 billion. Planet Online was for a time Britain's largest internet service provider. In 1998 Sykes sold it for £85 million to Energis.

According to The Sunday Times Rich List Sykes was worth £775 million as of 2025.

== Politics ==
Sykes entered politics in 1975, and was chairman of the Barnsley Conservative Party. He served on the Yorkshire Conservative Regional Council for many years.

Sykes left the Conservative Party in 1991 in a dispute with John Major and the party leadership over the Maastricht Treaty. Sykes is estimated to have donated £8 million opposing the Euro and to Eurosceptic campaigns.

In the 1997 general election he selectively funded Eurosceptic Conservative candidates, and in 1998 pledged to "use every means possible" to persuade British voters to say no in a referendum on the single currency, saying he would "raise hellfire to get the message across". The following year he began making large donations to the cross-party Democracy Movement, founded by Lady Annabel Goldsmith as a successor to the Referendum Party. He also donated £500,000 to Denmark's successful anti-euro campaign and £65,000 to the successful Irish No to the Lisbon Treaty campaign.

In 2000 Sykes supported the Conservative Party, led at the time by William Hague, but left the party because of a disagreement on not ruling out joining the Euro.

Sykes was a vehement opponent of the European Union and is noted for his belief that it represents an undemocratic, bureaucratic, super state in the making.

Sykes then donated almost £1,500,000 to UKIP for advertising during the 2004 elections to the European Parliament, making him the primary source of funding for the party. He subsequently admitted that UKIP's fourfold increase in seats at the election was a result of the party having "more loot" than the others. When Robert Kilroy-Silk, elected as one of UKIP's Members of the European Parliament (MEPs), criticised the leadership of Roger Knapman and expressed an interest in replacing him, Sykes announced his intention to cease funding of UKIP and appeared with Kilroy-Silk in a television interview to discuss the party and its leadership and made it clear that he would not support Kilroy-Silk.

On 17 November 2013 Sykes announced that he would do "whatever it takes" to help make the UK Independence Party (UKIP) be successful in the 2014 European Parliament elections. Sykes planned with Nigel Farage, a poster, leaflet and technology campaign across Britain costing Sykes £1,650,000. UKIP won the UK European Elections, electing 24 MEP's, which amounted to over 4 million votes, which was the first time in 100 years that an outside party had won a British Election. With the General Election approaching in 2015, the conservatives under David Cameron decided to give a national Referendum on the membership of the European Union.

In 2016 Sykes and Farage planned a nationwide poster and technology campaign, costing around £1,800,000, campaigning to Leave the European Union.

== Philanthropy ==
After treatment for the disease at Johns Hopkins, Baltimore in 2000, he funded the construction of a specialist prostate cancer unit at St James's University Hospital, Leeds. Sykes donated over £1m to the restoration of the Royal Hall in Harrogate. He funded Sir Ranulph Fiennes' expeditions on the Eiger for the British Heart Foundation, as well as the Everest Challenge and Marathon des Sables for Marie Curie Cancer Care raising millions for the charity.

Sykes now spends most of his time on environmental issues including work with Durrell wildlife conservation trust which is an international body dealing with endangered species. He also has an interest in preventing deforestation.

== Personal life ==
Sykes married Valeria Robinson in 1967; they divorced after 44 years of marriage. Robinson went on to buy and develop Grantley Hall into one of the UK's most luxurious hotels.

In 2015 Sykes moved to the island of Jersey, paying £29m for one of the islands finest properties, at the time it was the most expensive property ever sold in the islands history. Shortly after moving Sykes paid himself a dividend of £485m, which at the time was the biggest dividend in UK history.

Sykes was the owner of two yachts, a private plane and a home on the island of Mustique.
