= GameSurge =

Internet Relay Chat network

- Founded: February 2004
- Geographic location: United States; Europe
- Based in: Worldwide
- Executive board: Organization
- Website URL: www.gamesurge.net
- Primary DNS: irc.gamesurge.net
- Average users: 4,000 - 6,000
- Average channels: 4,000 - 5,000
- Average servers: 18
- Content/subject: Public/Video Games

GameSurge is a popular Internet Relay Chat network devoted to the online multiplayer gaming community. Games commonly seen referenced on GameSurge include many first person shooters (such as Counter-Strike, Counter-Strike: Source, Team Fortress Classic, Team Fortress 2, Day of Defeat, Call of Duty, and Battlefield 2) and MMORPGs (such as World of Warcraft and Guild Wars).

== History ==
GameSurge was created in February 2004, as a result of the merger of GamesNET users and the ProGamePlayer Network, a network with common interests. The merger, coincidentally, occurred during a time of legal disputes over the domain name gamesnet.net.

At present day, the user base of GameSurge is primarily North American, with a growing number of English-speaking gamers from Europe. The user base contains a large number of clans who participate in a wide variety of games. Among the more popular games on GameSurge are Counter-Strike, Counter-Strike: Source, Team Fortress Classic, Team Fortress 2, Day of Defeat, Urban Terror and Call of Duty.

== Services ==
GameSurge runs a feature-rich package of services known as srvx, which was written by GameSurge's development staff from scratch in C.

GameSurge provides five user-accessible services:

- AuthServ, which provides authentication for other services on the network and allows users to use an account to maintain channel access. In the interests of providing a service directed toward gaming (and thus allowing users to easily switch clan/team/guild tags), GameSurge does not provide nickname registration.
- ChanServ, which provides facilities such as event logging and advanced user/ban management.
- HelpServ bots, which manage support requests in certain channels via a FIFO queue.
  - HelpServ, in the #support channel, for general user support.
  - Other HelpServ bots in miscellaneous help channels throughout the network.
- SpamServ, which provides spam protection services to channels on the network. This service was added in July 2008.
- HostServ, which provides free "titles" to users wishing to use cloaked hosts. See the GameSurge Titles page for details.
