= Peter Dawe =

British entrepreneur (born 1954)

- Born: 1954 (age 71–72)
- Education: Cambridge College of Arts and Technology
- Occupation: Internet entrepreneur
- Known for: Founding Pipex, the commercial internet service provider, and the Internet Watch Foundation
- Political party: Reform UK (from 2019)
- Other political affiliations: Independent (until 2019); UK Independence Party (before 2017)

Peter Dawe OBE (born 1954) is a British Internet entrepreneur known for founding Pipex, the commercial internet service provider, and the Internet Watch Foundation.

== Business ventures ==
After studying management at Cambridge College of Arts and Technology, Dawe founded Unipalm in 1986 and Pipex in 1988.

After selling Unipalm/Pipex, in 1996 Dawe purchased a 1,500 acre farm in Norfolk, with the intention to set up a "self-sustainable" community called "Beat the Bear" that would support up to 100 "survivalists" who would pay between £10,000 and £100,000 per year to live in the community.

In 1996, Dawe also founded Safety-Net (later renamed Internet Watch Foundation) which proposed ideas to combat obscene material on the World Wide Web, for example a rating system that would tag web content similar to the BBFC rating scheme and block unrated or age-inappropriate material. For his work with the Internet Watch Foundation, Dawe received an OBE in the Queen's Birthday Honours of 2001.

In 2020, Dawe suggested that homeless people could sleep inside two wheelie bins, which he called a "Sleep Pod" as an alternative to rough-sleeping in sleeping bags. During the day, the homeless person can use the bins to store their clothes. Dawe came up with the idea after inventing a single person car, also created from a bin.

== Politics ==
Dawe ran as the UK Independence Party candidate for the Ely North and East seat in the 2013 Cambridgeshire County Council election. He lost to Conservative candidate Mike Rouse, receiving 17.6% of the votes.

For the 2017 Cambridgeshire and Peterborough mayoral election Dawe stood as an independent candidate for the newly created combined Mayor of Cambridgeshire and Peterborough role. He lost to Conservative candidate James Palmer, receiving 4.6% of the votes in the first round of voting.

Dawe ran for Parliament in the 2019 United Kingdom general election, where he stood as the Brexit Party candidate for Cambridge, losing to incumbent Labour Party candidate Daniel Zeichner, receiving 1.9% of the vote.
