= Zetnet =

Defunct ISP of the United Kingdom

Zetnet Limited
- Type: Limited
- Industry: Internet
- Founded: 1994
- Defunct: 2009
- Products: Internet Services
- Website: zetnet.com at the Wayback Machine (archived 2006-04-24)

Zetnet was one of the UK's oldest internet service providers and according to New Scientist is the brainchild of Ghufar Razaq and Graeme Storey. It was founded in Lerwick, in the Shetland Isles. According to the Shetland Fishing News, a journal of Shetland's fishing industry, the company began trading on 13 October 1994.

== History ==
In October 1994, Zetnet began trading as Zetnet Services. It became a Limited Company (Zetnet Services Ltd) in October 1995.

In 1996, Zetnet was thrown into the media spotlight through what nearly became a landmark legal case testing UK copyright laws on the internet.

In March 1999 Zetnet founded online gaming service Netgames UK, the brainchild of Sandy Sandom and Phil O'Malley. It was originally a wholly owned subsidiary, sharing Zetnet technical staff, but was sold in May 2000 and incorporated as Netgames UK Ltd. The company was run successfully until August 2001 when reports of a press release detailing a fall-out between Netgames UK management and its technical staff were seen.

In 1999, Zetnet hosted the Concurrent Versions System tree for the eggdrop project, an IRC bot. The CVS was maintained by staff member Jonathan Miles (Cybah), who also coordinated and committed patch contributions for the Eggdrop Development Team.

In 2001, Zetnet took over Charis Internet Services, a Birmingham-based ISP.

In January 2002 Zetnet bought the customers of ISP Cloud-Nine Communications, which had suffered a denial-of-service attack. Cloud Nine were based in Basingstoke, run by Emeric Miszti and John Parr.

On May 12, 2003, Zetnet co-founder and Technical Director, Tim Cole, died. The Zetnet home page was changed during the following week, to say "with great sadness Zetnet announces the death of Tim Cole co-founder director" and also "Tim had been suffering with heart problems for many years. On Sunday evening he had a heart attack from which he did not recover". According to an unconfirmed source, Tim's headstone says simply "internet pioneer" and can be found in the yard of the Dunrossness Kirk, Dunrossness in the south of Shetland.

In February 2005, Zetnet closed its head office in the Shetland Isles. According to The Shetland News, much of Zetnet's operations were run from an office in Manchester at the time.

In November 2005 Zetnet Services Ltd was put into administration. The administrators sold the assets and good will of the company to Zetnet Limited.

In May 2007, a press release surfaced on PRWeb which indicated that Zetnet Ltd was to be purchased by Solutrea Ltd, a "wireless and digital signage solutions provider".

In July 2008, Zetnet was acquired by Breathe Networks Limited (BNL), according to a news article by ISPreview.co.uk. Zetnet joined other BNL brands such as breathe, macunlimited, Ecosse, Intensive Networks, Bush Internet and Fast4. Although BNL stated an intent to operate Zetnet independently, it subsequently consolidated a number of Zetnet's services into its own platform during the first half of 2009.

On 16 July 2009 Zetnet Ltd was placed into administration.

== Legal case ==
In 1996, Zetnet was caught in the middle of a legal case between two of its local customers, The Shetland Times and The Shetland News, over copyright infringement. The web sites of both customers were hosted by Zetnet.

== See also ==
- List of UK ISPs by age
