= Rod Matthews =

British businessman (born 1943)

Roderick Alfred Matthews MBE (born 1943) is a British businessman, involved in the telecoms and IT sector, as well as the founder of Scottish Telecom, now known as Thus.

== Career ==
Having trained as a Chartered Engineer, Rod Matthews became Engineering Director at the CEGB before he went on to run a number of ICL businesses.

He was awarded the MBE in 1991.

In 1993 Rod Matthews established Scottish Telecom, now known as Thus, as a subsidiary of Scottish Power. He remained the Chief Executive until 1999.

Then in June 2000 he became President of Global Crossing Europe. He left that post after just six months and became Chief Executive of VersaPoint.

As of October 2008, Matthews sits on the boards of the following telecommunications companies:

- abica, a UK-based business telecoms provider and MVNO
- Keycom, a UK-based provider of internet access to student accommodation.
- Zamano, an Irish provider of content to mobile network operators.
