= KCOM Group =

UK communications and IT services provider

KCOM Group Limited
- Trade name: KCOM
- Formerly: Kingston Communications (KC)
- Type: Private limited company
- Traded as: LSE: KCOM
- Industry: Telecommunications
- Founded: 1902 as part of Hull Corporation floated as PLC 1999
- Headquarters: Kingston upon Hull, England, UK
- Products: Retail and Wholesale local and national telecommunications services, Broadband and internet services and IT and Network Solutions, Mobile service (KCOM Mobile)
- Revenue: £262.8 million (2020/21)
- Website: kcom.com

KCOM Group Limited (formerly Kingston Communications) is a UK communications and IT services provider. Its headquarters are in the city of Kingston upon Hull, and it serves local residents and businesses with Internet and telephony services. It was listed on the London Stock Exchange but is now privately owned by Macquarie Group.

For historical reasons, the Hull area has no BT landlines, and the vast majority of residents and most businesses in Hull, Hessle, Cottingham and Beverley are served only with telecoms services by KCOM.

== History ==
On 22 August 1902, Hull Corporation (which later became Hull City Council) was granted a licence under the Telegraph Act 1899 to operate a municipal telephone system in the Kingston upon Hull area, opening its first telephone exchange on 28 November 1904 at the former Trippett Street Baths.

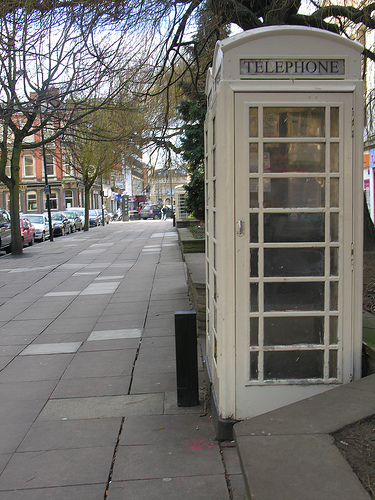
A Hull K6 white telephone box

At the time, there were a number of such municipal telephone companies around the UK, all of which – with the exception of the one in Hull – were gradually absorbed into the Post Office Telephone department, which later became British Telecom (BT). Hull's bid to renew its licence in 1914 was made conditional on the £192,000 purchase of the National Telephone Company infrastructure in the city. The council gave its approval, securing the future of the country's only remaining municipally owned telephone corporation.

The first rotary automatic exchange opened in 1922, and from 1934 Strowger exchanges were installed. Rotary and Strowger exchanges were operated to 1975 and 1988 respectively, and two crossbar exchanges to 1989, when the network became fully digital.

Hull has therefore remained an exception within the UK telephone network, being the only place in the UK not served by BT and is noted for its distinctive cream coloured telephone boxes and innovative services, for example becoming the UK's first fully digital network in 1989, using Marconi System X telephone switches (Central Offices or Class 5 switches).

The company was first listed on the London Stock Exchange in 1999 at 225p per share, with Hull City Council retaining 44.9% of shares. The share price peaked at £15.90 per share during the dot.com boom, and it was for a while in the FTSE 100 Index.

An ISP was formed in 1996 by Kingston Communications, under the brand name Karoo and was initially started as a Virtual ISP of Planet Online before it created its own independent infrastructure. A subsidiary of the KCOM Group, it primarily serves consumers in Kingston upon Hull and the surrounding area with its head office based in the city.

In the 1990s, before the introduction of unmetered, '0800' dial-up internet access and broadband, Karoo was one of the first ISPs in the country to offer untimed Internet calls. This took advantage of the fact that KC only charge a flat rate for local calls within their area.

It followed on from the success of Demon Internet's Point of Presence (PoP) in Hull in June 1992. Demon allowed users in Hull to make untimed calls for just 5.5p (+ VAT) to access the Internet via dialup accounts.

Karoo's dial-up service continued for a few years after Demon removed their local PoP. Karoo Xtra allowed Kingston Communications customers untimed access for the price of a 5.5p (+ VAT) call charge (and a subscription fee of £15 per month).

In the early part of the new millennium, the company started to pioneer services such as ADSL, Video on Demand and Digital TV. In February 2006, it announced that it would be ceasing its Video on Demand and Digital TV services (called Kingston Interactive TV – KIT) on 1 April 2006.

In 2007 Hull City Council sold its remaining 30.6% stake in Kingston Communications at about 68p per share. Kingston Communications also changed its name to KCOM Group that year.

In 2014, new Ofcom rules required all providers to offer broadband and phone bundles together, to offer better value to customers. Karoo's cheapest bundle was £29.99 per month. On 4 April 2016, KCOM Group PLC moved all of its brand under a single KCOM brand name.

In November 2018 KCOM issued a profit warning, cut dividends and warned debts were 10% higher than the previous year, causing a 36% drop in share price. KCOM was acquired by MEIF 6 Fibre Ltd, a business unit of Macquarie Group, in August 2019 at 120.3p per share.

In 2021, KCOM completed the sale of its national ICT business to managed services specialist Nasstar.

In September 2022 KCOM announced expansion of their FTTP Network to a further 50,000 premises in North Lincolnshire and East Yorkshire. Leading to expansions into Barrow, Barton, Brayton, Bridlington, Brigg, Broughton, Crowle, Driffield, Epworth, Goole, Goxhill, Haxey, Hibaldstow, Hornsea, Howden, Kirton Lindsey, Market Weighton, Messingham, Nafferton, Pocklington, Scotter, Scawby, Selby, Withernsea . This meant they would for the first time be competing directly with BT Openreach providers along with other FTTP Providers also carrying out roll out in the area such as InternetTY.

== Operations ==
Former KC logo (2010–2016)

KCOM provides ADSL, VDSL and fibre to the home (FTTH) broadband internet and telephone service in Hull and surrounding areas. The company only provide broadband services to customers with a KCOM residential telephone line. KCOM formerly provided these services under the Karoo and later KC brands, until it adopted the group name across its entire business in 2016. KCOM also provides business broadband services through its Eclipse Internet subsidiary.

In September 2011, the company began a six-month trial of a 100 Mbit/s service in the East Riding of Yorkshire village of Woodmansey. Around 300 homes were involved in the trial. The trial was part of a plan to roll out increased speeds to more than 15,000 homes across the East Riding of Yorkshire. The service is now available for up to 45,000 properties with a further 60,000, bringing the total fibre network to 105,000 properties by 2017.

KCOM's fibre to the premises product, Lightstream, requires a new fibre-optic cable be laid to each premises that is terminated inside the home in an optical network terminal (ONT). A router is then plugged into the ONT to distribute the service throughout the home. As of April 2015, the service offered software limited speeds of up to 250 Mbit/s downstream bandwidth. Due to delivery being FTTH greater speeds are a formality and fuelled by market expectation and not network restriction.

This led to Hull gaining a reputation for being a so-called digital city, a reputation which still holds true with Hull being in the top 16 digital clusters in the UK according to Tech City's Tech Nation report.

The company has been rolling out FTTH service across its footprint, and completed the rollout to 97% of the company's network by March 2019. The FTTH offering provides 900 Mbit/s service to residential customers and 1 Gbit/s service to business customers, with the remaining 4% of customers able to receive 75 Mbit/s VDSL2 service.

In October 2019, Hull became the first UK city to have full fibre broadband available for all residents.

== Monopoly concerns ==
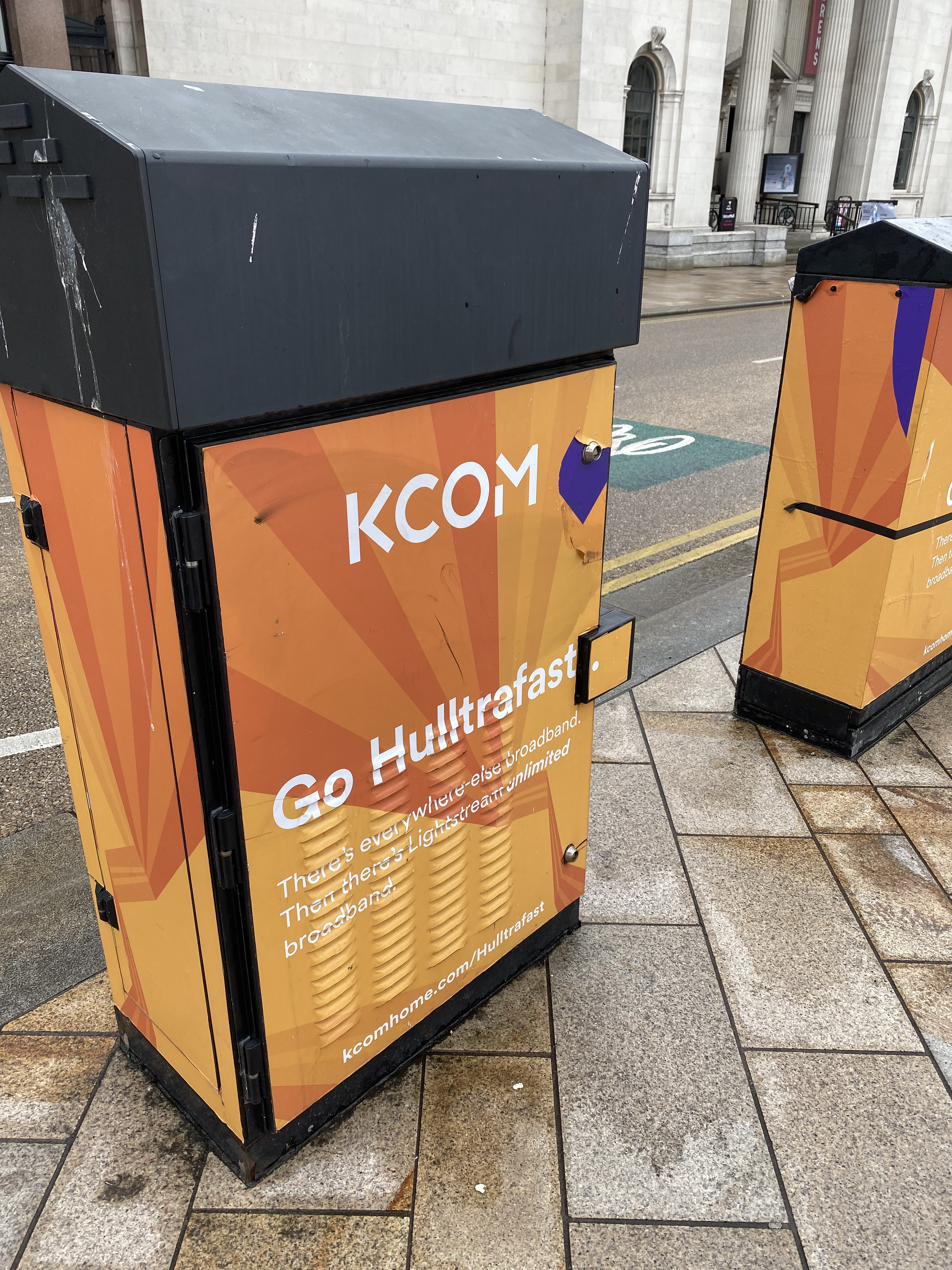
KCOM broadband cabinet

As residents and most businesses in Hull are served only with telecoms services by KCOM, there have been complaints around Internet service provision; KCOM's broadband service is the only fixed-line residential broadband operator in the Hull area. According to a decision from the European Commission in 2004, KCOM Group held a 100% market share in the wholesale market of broadband services in the Hull area.

In December 2005, Giacom, the owner of Hull24 – a rival broadband provider in the Hull area – complained to Ofcom regarding the provision of network access to KC's rivals. The complaint was that "Giacom alleges that Kingston is not providing [network] access on reasonable terms as Kingston's pricing is anti-competitive and prohibitive to service providers [other than KC]". In April 2006 Giacom and KC resumed negotiations on a deal to allow Hull24 to use KC's network; as a result Giacom withdrew its complaint and Ofcom closed the case.

In August 2007 the alleged monopoly of KC was referred to the European Commission by Diana Wallis, MEP for Yorkshire and Humber area.

In May 2008 the "Review of the wholesale broadband access markets" report published by Ofcom determined that KC was not acting in a way that would keep out rival companies, and that pricing for wholesale broadband and access to local-loop unbundling was within the market range. The main reason cited by rivals for not providing services in the Hull area was rather one of overall cost-effectiveness, given the relatively small number of potential customers (190,000 homes), and the fact that many of these would be likely to remain with the incumbent supplier.

In July 2009, Nexus Telecoms signed an agreement with KC enabling them to offer effective wholesale line rental and call tariffs to business consumers within the Hull area so giving them a choice of service provider. As Nexus only provide broadband service to businesses, several other providers offering wireless Internet access via Wi-Fi and licensed radio links have set up and have taken some of KC's customers including Pure Broadband and Nextgenus (which was ultimately purchased from administration by Connexin) both are local independent companies.

From late 2023, KCOM were embroiled in controversy when rivals started to erect wooden telegraph poles to carry their services into residential neighbourhoods, causing residents' protests. Local planning consent was not required under "permitted development rights".

Reporting on MP Emma Hardy's approach to Sir John Whittingdale, the minister for data and digital infrastructure, the BBC confirmed that "Under Ofcom rules, KCOM – as the area's dominant telecom provider – is required to share its infrastructure". Rival MS3 Networks alleged that KCOM had historically failed to respond in a timely manner to requests to share their existing underground infrastructure. Communications provider Connexin had some local facilities, but had requested Ofcom to provide "clarity on pricing and access" to KCOM's infrastructure. KCOM responded that "no provider has disputed any network access issues with us and we are not aware of any formal disputes lodged with Ofcom", and an Ofcom spokesperson confirmed that no rival had raised a formal dispute.

== Sponsorships ==
From 2002 to 2021 KCOM held the naming rights to the MKM Stadium, which hosts games played by Hull City A.F.C. and the Hull F.C. rugby league team. The stadium is owned by Hull City Council.

From 2014 to 2019 KCOM also held the naming rights to Craven Park, where Hull Kingston Rovers rugby league team play their games.

== See also ==
- Telephone numbers in the United Kingdom
- List of dialling codes in the United Kingdom
