= Telecom Electric Limited =

Telecom Electric Limited began life as a small project within the National Grid plc to determine the feasibility of running suspended optical fibre cables across the pylons of the high voltage power distribution network owned by the company. Three principal techniques were considered:

1. Optical Ground Wire (OPGW), which replaced the earth wire that runs across the top of the pylons with a new cable that contained a tubular core in which up to 24 optical fibres could be placed. However this option was expensive to implement as it would mean writing off the capital value of the old earth cable many years before it was due to be replaced as part of the normal operation and maintenance cycle. Installation was also very expensive and methods to reduce costs in this area needed to be developed.
2. Wrapped Fibre (WF), which involved a new technique of taking a variant of underground cable and wrapping it in a spiral fashion around the earth wire. A specially adapted machine was designed for the job to that made installation cost-effective. The challenge for the company however was how to protect the fibres in the cable from damage caused by starlings pecking at the cable sheath, which split open the cable exposing the fibres to water which would affect the optical transmission properties.
3. All Dielectric Self Supporting (ADSS) Cable, which consisted of non-metallic suspension components and was already used on low voltage power distribution networks in various parts of the world. However, it was found that at 275 kV and 400 kV, the voltages used on the National Grid infrastructure, the electromagnetic fields from the power cables were sufficient to induce microsparks inside the cable that degraded the dielectric materials causing the cable to fail and collapse.

Following various trials, cost-effective installation methods were developed for OPGW and the starling problem was resolved, but no solution was found at that time for the ADSS deterioration problem. These changes made it possible to install a nationwide network within the budget constraints set for the project and approval was given to start.

The other technical issues to resolve was what type of optical transmission equipment to use. A few years before a new standard for optical transmission systems called Synchronous Digital Hierarchy (SDH) had been developed and ratified as a global standard as a replacement for existing Plesiochronous Digital Hierarchy (PDH) equipment. As the Telecom Electric Project started manufacturers had started releasing SDH products onto the market and Russ Taylor, the SDH specialist in the TE team, after researching the UK SDH suppliers, recommended the project implement an all SDH network. This was a bold step at the time, but his research showed that with the right combination of suppliers, it was not only feasible, but would lead to a more efficient network with lower operating costs than the previous PDH products widely used and much more effective than starting with PDH and migrating to SDH over time.

The team reviewed the research material and recommended to the newly appointed CEO David Dey, that Nortel Networks and GPT be selected as suppliers. Nortel Networks were selected to provide the core backbone SDH systems and GPT the edge access systems for SDH-PDH interfacing with the customer. The decision led what was to become Energis Communications Limited to be the first UK operator install an all-SDH network capable of providing a fully synchronous connection to any customer. This unique selling point was a key differentiator in the marketing strategy for the first five years of operation of the business.
