= Unipalm =

Unipalm was a U.K.-based company that operated between 1986 and 2003 that specialised in networking different computers together using TCP/IP technology and was an early promoter of internet technology.

== History ==
Unipalm Ltd was founded as a software reseller in Cambridge in 1986 by Peter Dawe, later forming PIPEX in 1990, as the first commercial ISP in the UK. In its very early days, their office was in Hardwick, Cambridgeshire (UK)

In March 1994 Unipalm Group Plc floated on the London Stock Exchange, the purpose of the flotation was to expand the growth of The Public I.P. Exchange Ltd (Pipex).

In July 1995 the company changed its trading name to Unipalm-Pipex.

Unipalm PIPEX was sold to UUNet in November 1995 for GBP150 million, where it became UUNET/PIPEX. Dawe became Head of European Operations for UUNet Inc., with over 400 staff. Dawe left UUNet in July 1996. In 1996 it was reported that Unipalm-Pipex was the largest internet service provider in Europe.

In December 1996, Mark Norman led a successful management buy out of Unipalm. This re-established Unipalm as a separate company, moving location to offices in Newmarket, Suffolk. The company focussed on IP software distribution and services. In May 2000, German based company Computerlinks AG acquired 100% of the shares of Unipalm.

The company maintained a high level of independence until 2003 when the Unipalm name was dropped and began trading as Computerlinks UK. Unipalm changed its name to Computerlinks in 2006.

== See also ==
- List of United Kingdom ISPs by age
