= CloudNine Communications =

UK internet service provider

CloudNine Communications was a small Internet service provider (ISP) in Britain. After a crippling DDoS attack in January 2002, it was forced to sell its business to competitor Zetnet. CloudNine was one of Britain's original ISPs. It had been in business for six years.

Cloud Nine was run by Emeric Miszti, CEO and John Parr, Director of Operations. It was based out of the Beresford Centre, Basingstoke and employed approx. 15 people.

The company was formed in April 1996 and specialised in providing email services and software, web site hosting and was one of the first companies providing Software As A Service (SaaS) with MS Exchange and MSSQL. It had over 30,000 business customers.

Cloud Nine was voted ISP Review ISP of the Year 2000 and was continuously listed in the Top 10 rated UK ISP's (on ISP Review) from October 2000 through to January 2002.
