= RURTEL =

Early public-access computer-based communications network

In 1986, the Arkleton Trust, an independent research charity based in the Highlands of Scotland, launched Rurtel, one of the earliest public-access computer-based communications network of its kind in Europe. The aim was to demonstrate and explore the potential for new and emerging information and communications technologies in remote rural areas, with particular emphasis on organisations and individuals involved in community, educational and economic development in the Highlands and Islands of Scotland, one of the most remote and sparsely populated regions in Europe.

== Origins ==
The Arkleton Trust was established in 1977 to study new approaches to rural development and education, and improve understanding between rural policymakers, academics, practitioners and rural people.

The Trust works on rural development policy and practice, sharing experience and knowledge gained, with an emphasis on assisting and promoting rural development in less favoured regions globally. It does this through seminars, a publications programme, study tours, fellowships, and international research projects.

In 1985, the Arkleton Trust, under the leadership of its Programme Director Dr.John Bryden, commenced a twelve-nation, five-year, multi-national European research programme on Rural Change in Europe. As part of the programme, the Arkleton Trust piloted an early asynchronous computer-mediated communications (CMC) system using CoSy (short for Conferencing System) software, developed by Professor John Black, librarian at the University of Guelph in Ontario, Canada, and colleagues. The CoSy system was evaluated as the platform for linking project staff and researchers involved in compiling and analysing research material in institutions across Europe and North America.

CoSy had been developed primarily as a distance learning platform for colleges and universities in North America. It was later selected by the Open University in the UK as the basis for the university's national "electronic campus", launched in 1987.

Bryden's experience with the CoSy system, coupled with a commitment to improving rural communication and establishing more effective information exchange in rural areas, led the Arkleton Trust to consider trialling computer-mediated communications to enable greater interaction between organisations, policymakers, researchers and field workers engaged in rural development programmes.

Working in collaboration with the Highlands aqdn Islands Development Board, British Telecom and the CoSy development team at Guelph University, the Arkleton Trust developed Rurtel. a low-cost, computer-based conferencing and email system to enable organisations and individuals to overcome the traditional barriers of time, distance and cost, long associated with remote rural areas.

== The Rurtel System ==
The Rurtel system incorporated electronic mail, computer conferencing, file transfer and other electronic data services. One of the key features of the system was that users could access Rurtel using an ordinary PC with a dial-up modem, connected via a conventional telephone line to the Rurtel server, hosted on a high capacity micro computer running UNIX, located at the Arkleton Trust's office in the village of Nethy Bridge, south east of Inverness. The server was connected through a dataline linked directly to British Telecom's Packet Switching Service (PSS) which in turn, linked users to the International data networks (IPSS). The initial system offered 8 simultaneous lines to users, open 24 hours a day and had the capacity to handle approximately 60 regular users.

Rurtel users were required to log on to the system, identifying themselves with an ID and password. They were then free to use all the services the system provided. These included sending or receiving private mail messages, and viewing or contributing to topics within open "conferences". It also had a "moderator" whose task was to stimulate and guide discussions, and add new participants as and when required. The system also incorporated a "conversation" mode which allowed users to correspond privately in a closed, confidential and informal conference with one or more other users. The Rurtel system was designed to provide people in diverse geographical locations and workplaces, the opportunity to communicate and share ideas and information in a time and location independent manner.

The CoSy software was licensed from the University of Guelph, and British Telecom provided support by offering Rurtel users in the North of Scotland local call dial-up access to the packet switch stream service. Local call access was negotiated with BT following a joint conference with BT and HIDB in Inverness at which the HIDB, Rurtel users and others present made strong arguments for local call access. Providing local call access was a significant incentive for users since most telephone calls from the Highlands and Islands were charged at long-distance rates.

== Rurtel Pilot Project 1986-89 ==
In 1986, a three-year pilot project was launched in the Highlands and Islands of Scotland. Financial and technical assistance for Rurtel was received from the Highlands and Islands Development Board (HIDB), The University of Guelph, Torch Computers Ltd. of Cambridge, and British Telecom North of Scotland District.

The objectives of the pilot project were to trial and evaluate the potential for a computer-based conferencing system in the Highlands and Islands of Scotland; to demonstrate that computer-based communications can be cost-effective to set up and run, and to explore the practical benefits for organisations with personnel distributed across a wide geographical area.

The pilot project was initially aimed at voluntary, educational and other organisations known to face distance related problems, but it opened up access to public agencies, development organisations, and interested individuals engaged in rural development.

Rurtel differed from other systems such as bulletin boards and videotext, by being interactive providing a low-cost facility which could be used by people and organisations to exchange information, manage their operations and networks and create their own services

Intercativity between users was a crucial principle from the start because information provision from the operator was "top-down" and reflected an idea that useful information and lnowledge emerged from activities and institutions in political centres rather than at the "periphery"

At the outset, Rurtel set a target of 60 users by the end of the three-year pilot project. Other than the Arkleton Trust's own research group, the first user group to join Rurtel was the Association of Community Enterprises in the Highlands and Islands (ACE-HI), a support organisation providing services to the twenty-three community cooperatives and community enterprises dispersed across the region. Rurtel was used to link ACE-HI it board members with the organisation's head office, and later with its network of locally based field staff around the region, using Amstrad PPC640 laptop computers with built-in modems, running MSDOS 3.3.

The pilot project ended in 1989, with an evaluation undertaken by the Department of Rural Extension Studies at the University of Guelph in Ontario. The evaluation focused on users’ existing patterns of communication prior to Rurtel; their expectations before joining Rurtel and factors affecting their use of Rurtel. It also reviewed the applications adopted by Rurtel users during the pilot, along with any implementation issues, and it laid out a number of recommendations for the future. The evaluation report was published by the Arkleton Trust in 1990.

The pilot project had set out to establish and operate a computer-mediated conferencing network in the Highlands and Islands at a reasonable cost. By the end of the pilot phase the Trust's objectives had been achieved. The initial investment for equipment and server installation costs amounted to approximately £20,000, with annual operating costs of approximately £14,000. The latter had been partly offset by an annual charge for password IDs. (Note: Figures quoted as of 1989). User interest surpassed early expectations and by 1989, RURTEL was being used by some 150 individuals and organisations, primarily in the Highlands and Islands, but also elsewhere in the UK and in 13 other countries.

In March 1989, the Rurtel host software was moved from its original location to a larger server located in the headquarters of the Highlands and Islands Development Board in Inverness, immediately increasing the computing and line capacity necessary to accommodate the growing network of Rurtel users.

== Rurtel 1990-97 ==
In 1990, responsibility for Rurtel was handed over to a new company, the Network Services Agency (NSA), set up specifically by the Highlands and Islands Development Board (HIDB) in conjunction with British Telecom to manage Rurtel and its users. In Mrach 1989, the Rurtel host software was moved from its original location to a larger server located in the headquarets of the Highhlands and Islands Development Board in Inverness, immediately increasing the computing and line capacity necessary to accommodate the growing network of Rurtel uers.

Rurtel's need for local call access to users led to several packet switching nodes being installed by BT in the Highlands and Islands, a relatively low cost investment, but one which was certainly radical at the time, and led on to further such investments with EU regional development funding through the Highlands and Islands Telecommunications Initiative (HITI) during the late 1980s

In June 1989, the HIDB announced the launch of the Highlands and Islands Initiative, a £16.2 million partnership between British Telecom and the HIDB (and its successor organisation Highlands and Islands Enterprise) to transform the telecommunications network of the Highlands and Islands, replacing the previous analogue infrastructure with a fully digital network, using a mixture of optical fibre and microwave radio. In announcing the launch, it was described by the Chairman of the HIDB, Sir Robert Cowan as ".... without doubt, the most important single investment we have made in the economic future of the Highlands and Islands"

The development of Rurtel was selected as one of three case studies presented by British Telecom and the HIDB in support of their case to the UK Government for approval of £4.9 million of public funds towards the £16.2 million upgrade of the telephone network across the Highlands and Islands of Scotland. Completed in 1992, it was the first regional Integrated Services Digital Network (ISDN) in rural Europe.

Rurtel pioneered the use of computer-mediated communications in rural Europe. It continued to operate and serve public sectorlocal government, educational bodies, third sector support organisations, SMEs and individuals across the Highlands and Islands of Scotland throughout the mid-90s, primarily as a platform for online management, teleworking, and the remote delivery and support for distance learning and training.

It was also used by researchers in 11 countries or more collaborating with the Arkleton Trust and the Arkleton Trust (Research) Ltd (later The Arkleton Institute for Rural Development Research at the University of Aberdeen).

Rurtel was finally wound up in 1997.
