= Demon Internet =

British Internet service provider

- Type: Subsidiary
- Industry: Telecommunications
- Founded: 1 June 1992
- Founder: Cliff Stanford
- Defunct: 2020
- Fate: Merged into Vodafone Group
- Headquarters: United Kingdom
- Products: Business fixed line, Internet services and IT support
- Website: demon.net at the Wayback Machine (archived 2002-03-31)

Demon Internet was a British Internet service provider, initially an independent business, later operating as a brand of Vodafone. It was one of the UK's earliest ISPs, offering dial-up Internet access services from 1 June 1992. According to the Daily Telegraph, it "sparked a revolution by becoming the first to provide genuinely affordable access to the internet in the UK".

In 1997 Demon was bought by Scottish Telecom, a wholly owned subsidiary of the private utility company ScottishPower. Scottish Telecom rebranded as Thus plc in October 1999 and floated on the London Stock Exchange. Thus plc fully demerged from ScottishPower in 2002. Thus became part of Cable & Wireless plc, and then part of Cable & Wireless Worldwide following a split of its parent. The company was purchased as part of the acquisition of Cable & Wireless Worldwide by Vodafone Group on 27 July 2012. Demon then operated as a brand of Vodafone.

From 1996 to 2006 Demon operated a subsidiary ISP business in the Netherlands. It was sold to KPN in June 2006 and its operations transferred to their XS4ALL subsidiary.

In January 2019, Vodafone announced its intention to close Demon and migrate its 15,000 remaining customers to more modern services.

== History ==
A setup floppy for the Amiga OS for April 1995

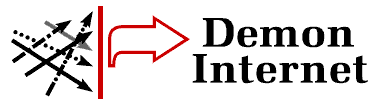
Logo as of 1997

Demon Internet was born out of Demon Systems, a bespoke business software development company formed by Cliff Stanford, Grahame Davies and Owen Manderfield. In a discussion of the need for a home-oriented dialup IP service on the CIX boards, Stanford suggested that if 200 people stepped up with £120 for a year's subscription, he would use Demon's infrastructure to create such a service.

Dismissing the idea that the Demon name might upset those with religious convictions, Cliff Stanford laughingly said he had considered getting the numbers "666" incorporated in the dial up.

The original Demon service was hosted using mainly Apricot servers including a gigantic pair of LSI towers named "gate" and "post".

When Demon started, WinSock was still a new concept that was not widely available and MS-DOS users were generally expected to download Internet connection software based on the KA9Q implementation of TCP/IP. Other platforms able to connect to the service included OS/2 Warp, Amiga, Archimedes, Atari, Linux and Mac. In 1995 the company acquired Chris Hall and Richard Clayton's Turnpike suite for Windows.

Its first service was the "standard dial-up" (SDU) - full TCP/IP access on a static IP address with a user chosen 4 to 8 character "nodename" (later 3–16 character "hostname") in the .demon.co.uk domain e.g. example.demon.co.uk. This allowed users to receive SMTP mail and other IP traffic direct to their computers. It was possible to operate independently of Demon or to make use of Demon's mail, news and IRC servers.

Demon was the first ISP to pioneer SDU service priced at £10 a month plus VAT (£10 only for the founder members), described in the sales literature as a "tenner a month". The low price attracted enough new customers that it was profitable and served to expand Internet usage in the UK.

Demon Internet received a healthy boost in user numbers when the UK Internet Book, written by pioneering internet writer Sue Schofield, negotiated with Demon to include a discount coupon in the book for newcomers to Demon. The book needed a change to Demon's mail systems. Schofield demanded and got a POP3 mail option added to the Demon service. The book sold 15,000 copies of the first print run, many readers subscribing to Demon.

Thanks to Demon Systems, Demon Internet always had a strong programming team allowing it to create solutions to emerging issues in-house. All three directors were programmers and Stanford wrote many business-critical pieces of software, writing modules to adapt MMDF to Demon's purposes. Mark Turner, originally one of Demon System's developers, wrote many of the accounts and operational systems. As Stanford was increasingly absorbed with corporate activities, Neil McRae eventually took over the work on the mail system. Oliver Smith moved from Systems to Internet to automate services for internal and corporate customers, establish Demon as a technical leader in industry forums such as the RIPE, DNS registry communities, e.g. .uk, and emerging open-source development communities etc. Later Peter Galbavy was brought in to develop solutions for interoperability issues and Ronald Khoo developed low-level networking solutions that allowed the company to run on free operating systems and PC-based hardware.

Many other key Demon people started out as developers – Giles Todd, Clive Feather, Richard Clayton.

Armed with so many developers, many of whom made names for themselves within the developing industry, Stanford used the company's ability to contribute its developments to the open source community as a means of developing Demon's reputation beyond what its Internet service commanded.

Demon's home-dialup focus was also its Achilles heel. The company had some exposure after sponsoring Fulham F.C., but British Telecom were sceptical of Demon's projected growth and did not provide for expansion, resulting in a regular shortage of lines and regular re-digs of the top end of Hendon Lane, Finchley, north London to lay down additional cables. Demon moved initially to Energis lines with a Regionally Organised Modem Pool (ROMP) and later added Colt lines to the service so they had more control over which lines new customers used over separate 0845 numbers.

In 1995, Demon acquired a 25% stake in competing UK Internet provider Cityscape Internet Services, as part of a deal to move Cityscape's backbone from Pipex to Demon. On 29 September, they acquired the remaining 75% of the company.

Demon's early days are described in an interview with Cliff Stanford published in The Independent on 15 January 1996.

The public telephone number of the company, and many of the dialup access numbers, ended with 666 (the supposed Number of the Beast), a deliberate pun on the name Demon. When Thus plc was formed as a parent of Demon, its randomly allocated company number also ended in 666. Also, after a spate of "access" related names (e.g. gate, post) many of its original servers' hostnames started with dis, being the initial letters of Demon Internet Services as well as the name of a part of Hell in Dante's Inferno and another name for Lucifer.

== Ownership ==
In June 2008 Cable & Wireless plc made a predatory offer for Demon's parent, Thus. On 1 October 2008, Cable & Wireless completed the takeover of Thus.

Cable & Wireless split into two separate businesses on 26 March 2010. Thus and Demon came under the ownership of the original business, which was renamed Cable & Wireless Worldwide. This was purchased by Vodafone in July 2012 which began integrating the business with its own. Thus and Demon were integrated into Vodafone on 1 April 2013.

During 2016–2019, the Demon Internet service was slowly wound down with a view to migrating customers over to Vodafone branded products, a process that took longer than expected with some customers still being provided with Demon ADSL at the end of May 2019 due to a large backlog in the processing of migration requests.

== IRC servers ==
Demon ran IRC servers on both the IRCnet and EFnet networks from 1993 and on QuakeNet later on. In 2009, Demon delinked their server from QuakeNet and EFnet.

== See also ==
- Godfrey v Demon Internet Service
- Internet in the United Kingdom § History
- Point-to-Point Protocol
- Post Office Protocol
- Serial Line Internet Protocol
- Simple Mail Transfer Protocol
