= Sylvia Spruck Wrigley =

American novelist

- Born: 7 March 1968 (age 58); Germany
- Occupation: Author
- Writing career
- Genres: Fantasy, science fiction, aviation
- Notable works: Alive, Alive Oh; The Front Line; You Fly Like a Woman
- Website: intrigue.co.uk

Sylvia Spruck Wrigley (born 7 March 1968) is an American/German author, writing science fiction and fantasy as Sylvia Spruck Wrigley, and aviation non-fiction as Sylvia Wrigley. She grew up in Los Angeles and Germany. She currently lives in Tallinn, Estonia, where she moved with her partner Cliff Stanford in 2017.

Wrigley's short story "Alive, Alive Oh", published in the June 2013 issue of Lightspeed Magazine, was a nominee for the 2013 Nebula Award for Best Short Story. She has written bespoke near-future science fiction for Thales Group and NATO and serialised fiction at Serial Box.

She has spoken at major fiction conventions such as Worldcon and Estcon.

== Aviation ==
Sylvia Spruck Wrigley is a general aviation pilot who has spoken in the press about aviation incidents, such as to the Express regarding the disappearance of flight MH370.

On her website, Fear of Landing, Sylvia explores what accident reports reveal about flying and what they leave out. In 2019, the website had nearly half a million visitors.

Other notable works include Lessons before the accident in March 2026 for AOPA and Great Mull Air Mystery has finally been solved in March 2026 for The Times.

== Aviation bibliography ==
- "Pilot Error", 2023
- "Chapter 55: Age and Aging", in 'The Routledge Handbook of Star Trek', 2022
- "Reckless Final Approach: US Bangla Flight 211", 2021
- "Without a Trace: 1970–2016", May 2019
- "Yak-52 Crash at MoD Boscombe Down", 2019
- "Without a Trace: 1881–1968", March 2018
- "Why Planes Crash: Case Files 2003", 2016
- "The Mystery of Malaysia Flight 370", May 2014
- "Why Planes Crash: Case Files 2002", 2014
- "Why Planes Crash: Case Notes 2001", May 2013
- "You Fly Like A Woman", December 2011
- "Monthly column in Piper Flyer", 2007–2008

== Aviation media appearances ==
- National Geographic ''Mayday''
- Air Crash Investigation Season 21, 2021
- Aircrash Confidential Series 2, 2012 and Series 3, 2018
- Channel One Russia 30 March 2014: Спасатели вновь изменили район поиска пропавшего малазийского "Боинга"
- M6 (TV channel) 5 March 2015: Disparition du vol MH370
- NTV (Russia) 28 March 2015: Центральное телевидение
- TRT World Nexus 'Air France, Airbus - guilty of MANSLAUGHTER' 28 May 2026

== Science fiction and fantasy bibliography ==
=== Selected stories in online magazines ===
- "Locus, Issue 770", March 2025
- "The girl who used to be my sister", Nature, October 2025
- "Cyberjunk", Nature, August 2023
- "In response to your request for a modification to the atmosphere of break bulk cargo hold 17", Nature, November 2022
- "Hoist by her own Picard" Nature, 2021
- "Two lists..." Daily SF, 2017
- "Project Daffodil" Nature, 2016
- "Domnall and the Borrowed Child", a Tor.Com Novella, November 2015
- "Alienated" Nature Physics", October 2014
- "Space Travel Loses its Allure When You’ve Lost Your Moon Cup" Crossed Genres, July 2014
- "Regarding Your Unexpected Visit to the Surface of an Apparently Only Mostly Uninhabited Planet" Daily SF, January 2014
- "I've Been Hacked", Daily SF, January 2014
- "A Letter from Your Mother", Daily SF, January 2014
- "Alive, Alive Oh", Lightspeed, June 2013
- "When the Selkie Comes", Daily SF, September 2013
- "Vintage Millennial Cookery InfoManual by the Geusian Ladies Society", Crossed Genres, May 2013
- "The Front Line", Nature, May 2013
- "Old Flames", Daily SF, November 2012
- "Looking for a Knight in Shining Armor", Daily SF, November 2011
- "Plague of Locusts", Unlikely Story, 2011
