= Eclipse Internet =

Business technology service in England

Eclipse
- Company type: Subsidiary
- Industry: Technology
- Founded: 1995
- Headquarters: Horsham, United Kingdom
- Parent: Global 4 Group
- Website: eclipsebroadband.co.uk

Eclipse Broadband, previously known as Eclipse Internet and Eclipse, is a UK provider of business technology services previously based in Exeter, Devon and Hull, East Yorkshire where it was owned by KCOM Group PLC. Eclipse supplies connectivity, cloud and communication services to support businesses. Its three product portfolios include ADSL, fibre and leased line broadband services; wide area networks as a managed service; backup, Lync, Hosted Exchange and data hosting services; and communication services, including both fixed line and IP-based voice. Eclipse Broadband is now a part of the Global 4 Group.

== History ==
Eclipse Internet began in 1995 as a South West internet service provider utilising an 0845 dialup number.

In 2001, Eclipse launched its first Broadband product, based on BT's wholesale ADSL service. In 2004, the company was purchased by KCOM Group PLC for a total of £12.5 million. £9.5 million was paid in cash, whilst the remainder was paid in KCOM Group PLC shares. In 2005, Eclipse began trials of a combined digital television, telephone and broadband service.

Eclipse also rejigged its broadband packages into three new packages and removed its fair use policy, the only restrictions on use now being the amount of data downloaded.

In 2010, Eclipse gave an official response to proposals by Ofcom to investigate Net Neutrality in the UK.

In 2021, KCOM sold the Eclipse customer base to Global 4 Group who serves the customers as Eclipse Broadband Limited.
