= Broadband in Northern Ireland =

In Northern Ireland over 80% of the population has access to the internet, with 9 in 10 people having an internet connection at home.

== Background ==
Northern Ireland is one of the best connected regions in Europe and has the highest availability of fibre broadband in the UK, with 95% of premises able to access fibre-enabled cabinets in June 2013. In 2015 British Telecom rolled out the first fibre-to-the-premises (FTTP) broadband connections in the UK, offering download speeds of 330 Mbit/s. Currently, residents of Northern Ireland have a choice of 27 broadband service providers.

As of 2020, 50% of Northern Ireland has access to ultra fast broadband, with speeds of 1 Gbit/s or greater.

== BT ==
As well as being the largest provider of landlines, BT is also currently the largest internet service provider in Northern Ireland.

In 2009, BT started rolling out Fibre Optic broadband in certain locations within the United Kingdom and Belfast was chosen as one of the trial areas.

BT Superfast Fibre (formerly BT Infinity) first became available in the Balmoral area of South Belfast in spring 2010, now it is currently available in other areas of the city including West and South Belfast, and in many other parts of Northern Ireland. Belfast residents can now get speeds up to 900 Mbit/s with BT Superfast Fibre.

As of 2020, BT, through its subsidiary Openreach, is continuing to roll out fibre-to-the-premises (FTTP) broadband to businesses and residential households in Northern Ireland.

== Virgin Media ==
Virgin cable services are available throughout Northern Ireland in most cities. Belfast and Derry has had cable since the mid-1990s when CableTel installed the infrastructure, later adopting NTL as its name, and then 2006 merging with Telewest becoming NTL:Telewest, and again later that year merging ultimately with Virgin, and then re-branding as Virgin Media in 2007. Derry has enjoyed Fibre Broadband since the early 2000s. The top speed available in some areas is 300 Mbit/s. Virgin offer TV, Broadband and Telephone services, and are currently the second largest company in Northern Ireland providing telephone and broadband services.

Virgin currently offers the fastest broadband, with some areas able to avail of connection speeds of up to 300 Mbit/s down their own fibre optic cables.

If customers are not in a fibre optic area they can take up Virgin's ADSL broadband which offers speeds of around 20 Mbit/s almost every area in Northern Ireland are able to get this service as it uses the telephone lines rented of BT to provide the service.

== Fibrus ==
Fibrus, a broadband infrastructure startup, plans to connect 150,000 homes and businesses in Northern Ireland to FTTP broadband. The company plans to invest £100m in building broadband infrastructure in the country, and ultimately aims to deliver complete full-fibre broadband coverage by 2025.

In September 2020, Fibrus won a £165m contract to extend superfast broadband coverage in rural Northern Ireland. The deal was primarily financed by the UK government.

== See also ==
- Broadband
- List of broadband providers in the United Kingdom
- Telecommunications in the United Kingdom
  - Internet in the United Kingdom
- Telecommunications in the Republic of Ireland
  - Internet in the Republic of Ireland
- Virgin Media
