= Telegraph Act 1899 =

Act of the Parliament of the United Kingdom

Telegraph Act 1899 (Note: Section 4.)
- Act of Parliament
- Parliament of the United Kingdom
- Long title: An Act to make further Provision for the Improvement of Telephonic Communication, and otherwise with respect to Telegraphs.
- Citation: 62 & 63 Vict. c. 38
- Territorial extent: United Kingdom

Dates
- Royal assent: 9 August 1899
- Commencement: 9 August 1899 (Note: The Acts of Parliament (Commencement) Act 1793.)
- Repealed: 25 July 2003 (Note: The Communications Act 2003 (Commencement No. 1) Order 2003 (SI 2003/1900).)
Other legislation
Amended by	Local Government Act 1933; Local Government (Scotland) Act 1947; Statute Law Revision Act 1950; Local Government Act 1972; Telecommunications Act 1984
Repealed by	Communications Act 2003

Status: Repealed

Text of statute as originally enacted

Revised text of statute as amended

The Telegraph Act 1899 (62 & 63 Vict. c. 38) was an act of the Parliament of the United Kingdom that allowed urban district, borough and burgh councils to construct and operate telephone exchanges, on a similar basis to the then-usual municipal provision of other utilities.

Licences were granted to Glasgow, Belfast, Grantham, Huddersfield, Tunbridge Wells, Brighton, Chard, Portsmouth, Hull, Oldham, Swansea, Scarborough and West Hartlepool. Six of these licences were used to provide a telephone service:

- Glasgow (1901)
- Tunbridge Wells (1901)
- Swansea (1902)
- Portsmouth (1902)
- Brighton (1903)
- Hull (1904)

Of these, only the Hull service remains as an independent operation and is now known as KCOM.
