= Planet Online =

- Industry: Internet service provider
- Founded: July 1995; 31 years ago
- Founder: Paul Sykes; Peter Wilkinson
- Defunct: August 2000
- Fate: Acquired by Energis Squared
- Headquarters: Leeds, United Kingdom
- Website: Official website

Planet Online was a British business-to-business Internet service provider. Based in Leeds, it was started by local businessman and multi-millionaire Peter Wilkinson and Paul Sykes in July 1995.

== History ==
Managed from a purpose-built NOC in Leeds, Planet's network was first switched on in October 1995 with over 2,000 businesses connected by the end of the following year. The office in Leeds was shared with hardware specialist and sister company ESS, with the two formally merging on 1 January 1997. The merged company retained the Planet Online name.

Planet was sold to Energis in August 1998 for £85m at a time when it carried around 40% of all internet traffic in the UK. In August 2000, the company was renamed Energis Squared and given new branding consistent with that of its parent. It was later integrated into the rest of the Energis business, losing its separate identity.

Planet notably provided the back-end infrastructure for the consumer ISP Freeserve, led by John Pluthero, which helped it to become one of the UK's few profitable ISPs at that time. Then as Cable & Wireless Worldwide, itself led by Pluthero until 2011 then as part of Vodafone and subsequently IBM the company continues to provide similar services to Freeserve's ultimate successor, Orange Broadband.

== Awards and recognition ==
The company was winner of the Best Business ISP award at the ISPA Internet Industry Awards in 1999 and 2000.

== See also ==
- Freeserve
- Energis
- Cable & Wireless Worldwide
- Internet in the United Kingdom
