= CoSy =

Computer conferencing system

CoSy, short for Conferencing System, was an early computer conferencing system developed at the University of Guelph.

The CoS software grew out of an interest in group computer mediated communication systems in 1981 by Dick Mason and John Black. A project was initiated in the Institute of Computer Science to investigate and possibly acquire an asynchronous computer conferencing system, and a small team of Bob McQueen, Alastair Mayer and Peter Jaspers-Fayer undertook the investigation of two existing systems, EIES from New Jersey, and COM from Sweden. It was then decided that developing a new system in-house would be the best path to take.

A new system started to take shape, written in C and operating under a UNIX operating system on a Digital Equipment Corporation PDP-11 with dial-up telephone ports. Much thought was given to the user interface and group interaction processes, especially as most of the user dial-up connections were originally at very slow 300 bits (30 characters) per second through acoustic modems. The system was gradually introduced to and tested by a small group of users, and eventually made available to other external organizations beginning in 1983. Licenses to use the Unix version of the software were granted to other sites, mainly universities, and a VMS version was also developed and made available for license. CoSy was selected by Byte to launch their BIX system in 1985

In addition to BIX, it was used to implement a similar British system named CIX, as well as numerous other installations such as CompuLink Network.

In 1985, the Arkleton Trust, a small independent research charity based in the Highlands of Scotland, worked with the CoSy team at Guelph to incorporate CoSy into the Arkleton Trust's RURTEL, one of the earliest, public-access computer-based communications networks of its kind in Europe.

CoSy was also chosen for the Open University's "electronic campus".

The software was used at the University of Victoria in the Creative Writing department in the 1980s. This exposure to Dave Godfrey led to some rights to the software being later acquired by the British Columbia company SoftWords, who developed it into CoSy400 and added a simple web interface, before losing interest.

When the BIX system closed down, several former "bixen" approached University of Guelph and SoftWords and obtained the right to release the original version of CoSy under the GPL. It is now developed as an open source project, and was the basis of the BIX-like NLZero (Noise Level Zero) conferencing service.
