= Names.co.uk =

British web service provider

- Trade name: names.co.uk
- Type: Private
- Industry: Internet; web hosting; IT consulting; Domains; cloud computing
- Founded: 1997
- Headquarters: Worcester, UK
- Services: Domains; web hosting; email hosting; website builder; VPS; dedicated hosting; SSL certificates; online booking; online compliance; digital accessibility
- Parent: team.blue
- Website: names.co.uk

Namesco Ltd (names.co.uk) is a British company providing online internet services for individuals and businesses, including domain name registration, web hosting, website building tools, email services, ecommerce solutions and a range of managed and unmanaged servers.

== History ==
Namesco was founded by Richard and Rachel Suthering as a small Internet startup named "Names.co Internet Services Limited" originally based in North East England. In 1997 another Internet startup was founded by Kevin Savage, Jason Smith and John Sewell named Phase8.com "Webcall.com Limited" based in Worcester.

In 2002, it was rumoured that Ian Gowrie-Smith, Australian chairman of drug company SkyePharma was planning a reverse takeover of Namesco with the assistance of its chief executive and finance director, David Lees.

Trading of Namesco shares on AIM were suspended on 19 December 2003 prior to the announcement of Gowrie-Smith's action. A Vietnamese gold mining company, Larchland, was injected into the company in a £19.6million reverse takeover deal that saw the business renamed as Triple Junction PLC. Namesco was hived down into a subsidiary and sold to Womerah Limited.

As a privately owned company, Namesco then had the capital to make new acquisitions as part of their growth strategy. In July 2004, they acquired NamesWeb; a small domain and web hosting business, and on 17 September 2004, they doubled the size of their internet business by acquiring a competitor, the local and profitable Malvern based Simply.com Limited for GBP£2.15M. Simply.com Limited at the time managed 91,000 domain names and 32,000 active customers.

In March 2005, the assets of domain and hosting business Net2 Ltd were acquired followed by the acquisition of broadband business NDO Ltd in July. As NDO also sold domain names, web hosting and dialup internet access, this acquisition allowed Namesco to offer its customers ADSL services.

In July 2007, Namesco Ltd was purchased by Register.it Spa, an Italian Internet company owned by Dada, for £24.5million. Having previously acquired Spanish company Nominalia, this added a substantial UK operation to the division.

On 28 May 2008, Namesco Ltd acquired the assets of Register365, Ireland's largest hosting provider, through its subsidiary Namesco Ireland Ltd, adding 40,000 domains to its portfolio. This made Namesco the fourth largest UK provider of domain names and shared hosting services.

In 2010, Nameco acquired the dedicated hosting provider Poundhost.

In 2014, Namesco's broadband customer base was acquired by The Phone Co-op; Commercial Director of Namesco, Stephen Ewart, said this was to enable the company to focus on their core product ranges of web hosting, domain name registry, email and website building services.

== Security problems ==
On 13 January 2012, Namesco suffered a security breach which resulted in over 100 customers needing to cancel their cards. "...card details were leaked after hackers broke into Namesco's systems, Namesco warned that users' account administration email, account names, dates of birth, contact numbers and postal addresses may also have been exposed by the breach". Namesco notified the Information Commissioners Office about this loss, and customers were advised to update their passwords and cancel their card details. However, the company faced criticism over the format of their warning, which bore similarities to emails used in "phishing" scams.
