= Thus (company) =

British telecommunications provider

Thus Ltd.
- Logo as of 2005
- Type: Subsidiary
- Industry: Telecommunications
- Founded: 1994 (as Scottish Power Telecommunications Holdings Ltd)
- Headquarters: Glasgow, Scotland, UK
- Number of employees: 1,700 (2009)
- Parent: Vodafone
- Website: www.thus.net

Thus was a telecommunications provider operating in the United Kingdom based in Glasgow, Scotland. The company was once listed on the London Stock Exchange and became a subsidiary of Cable & Wireless Worldwide (CWW). Following the acquisition of Cable & Wireless Worldwide by Vodafone in July 2012, the company was gradually integrated into Vodafone. This was completed on 1 April 2013.

== History ==
The company was founded in 1994 as Scottish Power Telecommunications Holdings Ltd (trading as Scottish Telecom), an offshoot of the energy company ScottishPower. In 1998 the company acquired Demon Internet. Rod Matthews, who had founded the business, remained as Chief Executive until 1999.

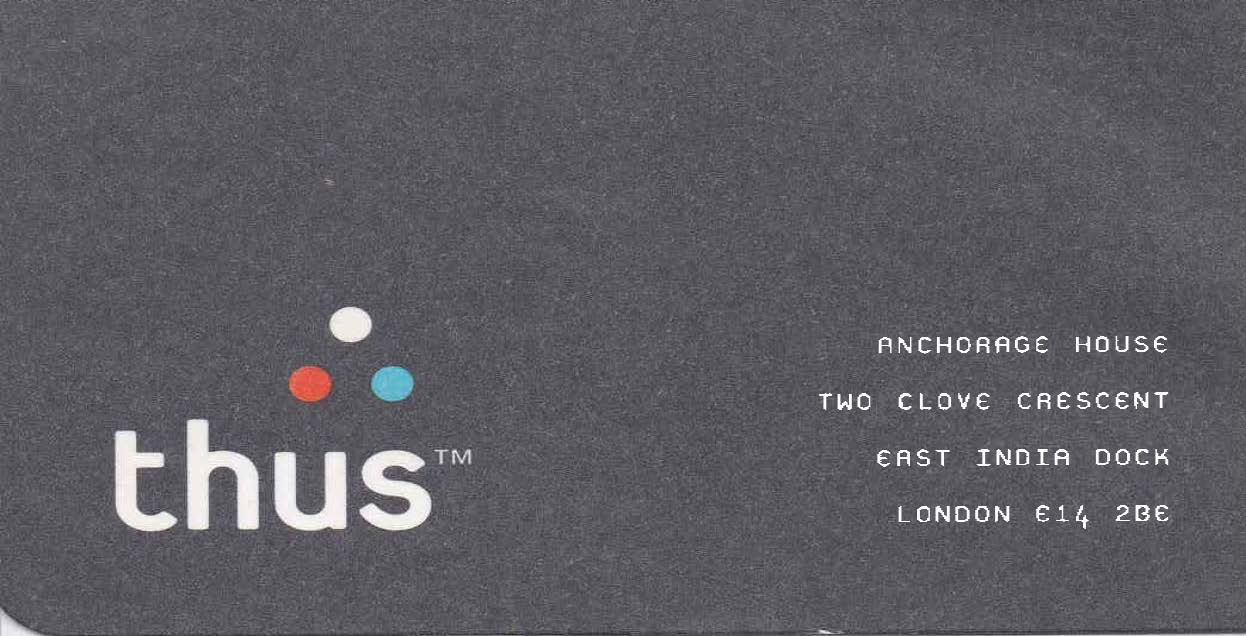

On 4 October 1999 Scottish Telecom announced their new name "thus".

A short while later in 1999, the newly named Thus PLC listed on the London Stock Exchange.

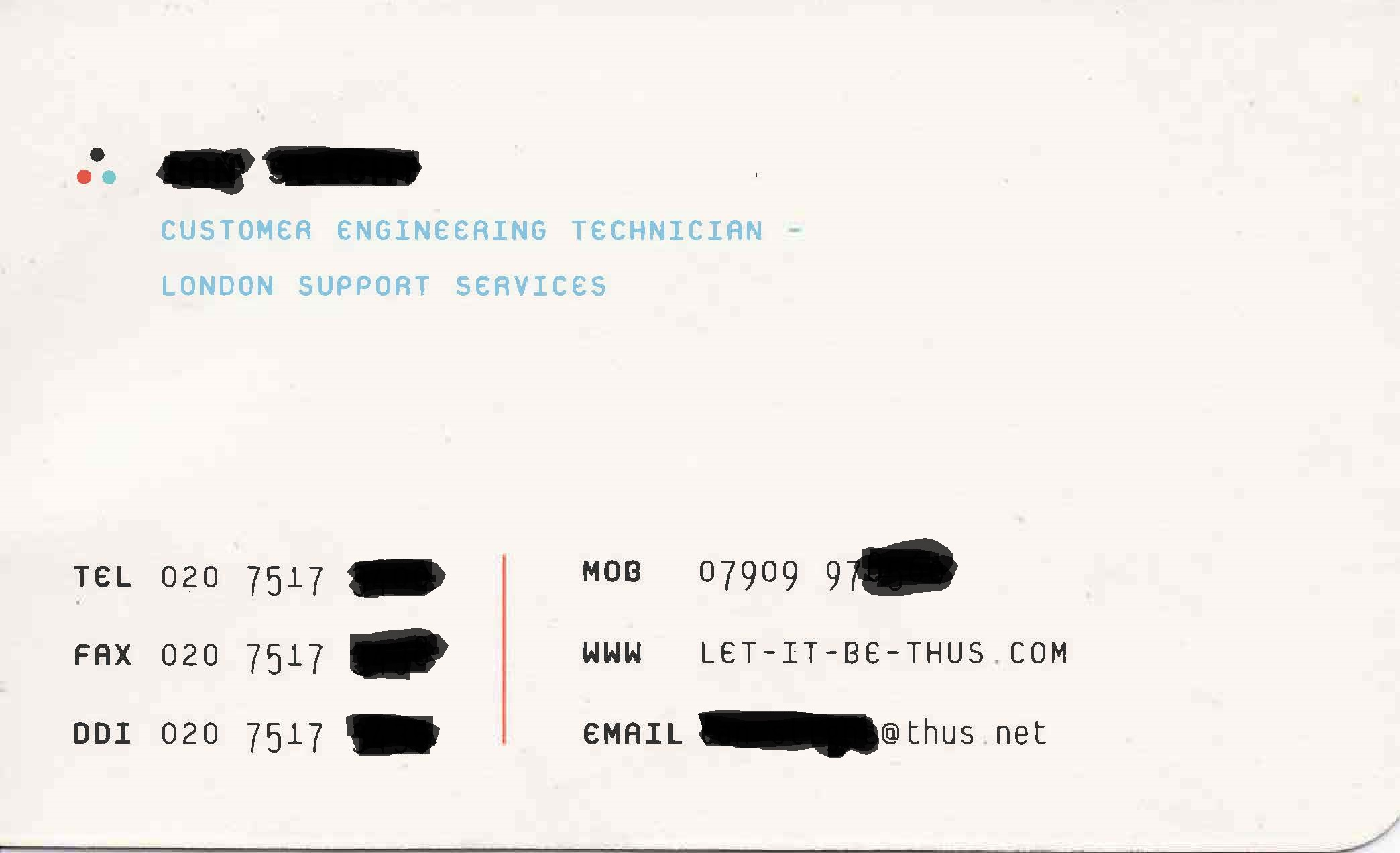
Front and back of a London-branch employee’s business card showing the original Thus logo and internet domain name "let-it-be-thus.com" - circa 2000.

In 2002 it was demerged from Scottish Power in a deal which effectively wiped out the majority of the company's debts, placing the company on a sound financial footing.

In August 2004 it sold its call centre operation to Response Handling Ltd and in 2006 it acquired Your Communications and Legend Communications.

On 28 May 2008 Cable & Wireless plc announced their intention to purchase the company with an offer of 165p per share: this first offer was rejected on 6 June 2008. On 30 June 2008, Cable & Wireless announced that it had acquired a 29.9% stake in Thus and tabled an improved offer of £329 million, or 180p per share. On 1 October 2008, Cable & Wireless completed the takeover of Thus: the company became known as "Thus, a Cable & Wireless business".

== Operations ==
The company supplied some services (most notably Internet services) to small businesses. Many of its major customers had their business transferred to Cable & Wireless Worldwide.
