= QuakeNet =

IRC network

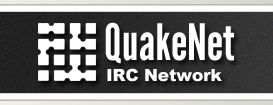
- Founded: 1997; 29 years ago
- Geographic location: Europe; United States
- Based in: Worldwide
- Website URL: www.quakenet.org
- Primary DNS: irc.quakenet.org
- Average users: 65,000 – 75,000
- Average channels: 40,000 – 45,000
- Average servers: 12
- Content/subject: Public/Video Games

QuakeNet is an IRC network, and was one of the largest. The network was founded in 1997 by Garfield (Henrik Rasmussen, Denmark) and Oli (Oli Gustafsson, Sweden) as a new home for their respective countries' Quake channels. At its peak on February 8, 2005, the network recorded 243,394 simultaneous connections. As of 2020, there are 9 servers and about 12,000 users remaining.

== About QuakeNet ==
Founded in 1997 as an IRC network for QuakeWorld players, QuakeNet saw huge growth over the coming years as it attracted many other gamers. As interest in IRC started to decline, QuakeNet's userbase followed suit.

== Services ==
Channels often feature QuakeNet's requestable bespoke channel service 'Q'. Q is the main channel service and manages account authentication similar to nickname registration on servers with Nickserv; although there is no nickname protection service, instead operating on a first come first served basis. The other popular channel service seen in the larger channels is 'S'. S is SpamScan, a service used to detect spam from channels and warn or later punish the offending users. Since April 2014, D was also added as a channel service which collects various statistic metrics about a channel, such as word counts and popular phrases.

Additional services include O as an operserv reference bot to the server operators on QuakeNet, and R (RequestBot) which allows users to request both Q and S if their channel meets their requirements. There are many other backend services which help QuakeNet staff administer the network. QuakeNet also is the home to many other third-party bot-operated services that can be used for various purposes to assist channel operators to run their channels or provide light entertainment. Many of these channels can be found using the channel search facility on the QuakeNet website.

== Webchat ==
QuakeNet has a webchat client which allows users to connect to the network without the use of a dedicated IRC client. The client software, called qwebirc, was created by the QuakeNet development team. It is often embedded into other websites and also used by other IRC networks.
