= John Pluthero =

British businessman (born 1964)

- Born: 1964 (age 60–61); Chelmsford, UK
- Occupation: Former CEO of Cable & Wireless Worldwide

John Pluthero (born 1964) is a British businessman.

Born in Chelmsford, Essex, in 1964, Pluthero was educated at Colchester Royal Grammar School and graduated with a First in Economics from the London School of Economics. On graduating he joined the accounting firm Coopers and Lybrand and qualified as a Chartered Accountant three years later. He later worked for P&O and served as director of the Chelsea Harbour development.

He held senior positions at Dixons, Bass PLC and was the founder of Freeserve, Europe's first dotcom IPO, listing on the London Stock Exchange a year after start-up at a valuation of £1.5Bn. After the sale of Freeserve to France Telecom he was asked by Archie Norman and a consortium of banks to lead the turnaround of Energis after its financial collapse. In 2006, after 4 years the business was sold to Cable and Wireless with restored growth, profitability and cashflow. On acquisition Pluthero became the CEO of Cable and Wireless's non-incumbent businesses to perform a similar turnaround to those businesses. Over four years profitability had improved by >£500m and cashflow by >£700m.

In 2011 Pluthero became Group CEO to prepare the businesses for demerger of the Cable and Wireless group. On demerger Pluthero became the Chairman of Cable and Wireless Worldwide.

Pluthero has subsequently advised on several start-ups in the tech space and has held chairman and Board positions at Essensys, CODE Investing and MyAppConverter.

He founded an Art charity, Abstract Critical, with renowned British sculptor Robin Greenwood.
