= Wanadoo =

Former internet provider

- Industry: ISP provider
- Fate: Rebranded to Orange on 1 June 2006
- Owner: Orange S.A.
- Website: www.orange.fr

Wanadoo was the Internet service provider division of Orange S.A. It operated in France, Spain, the United Kingdom, Belgium, the Netherlands, Morocco, Tunisia, Algeria, Senegal, Mauritius, Madagascar, Lebanon and Jordan. It ceased to operate as a worldwide brand on 1 June 2006, when it was rebranded as Orange.

The origin of the name Wanadoo is subject to some controversy, as some maintain it came about in the late 1990s when many internet companies chose to compete by creating "Yahoo!"-sounding names. However, it might be that the name Wanadoo first appeared in an internal project at France Télécom, much in line with a number of other such projects such as France Animation until 2003, Intranoo, Tatoo, Netatoo and @noo.

Wanadoo was floated on the stock market on 18 July 2000. In 2000, Wanadoo also took over the major British ISP Freeserve, which had previously been part of the Dixons Group. Following the buy-out, Freeserve maintained its own branding for a while before finally changing to the Wanadoo name on 28 April 2004.

In 2002, Wanadoo expanded into the games industry by purchasing Index+. Wanadoo integrated Index+ into its new games division, Wanadoo Edition. On 30 September 2003, Wanadoo Edition was integrated into MC2 France and from this deal Wanadoo also became a 12% shareholder of Microïds.

== Orange rebranding ==
Wanadoo changed to Orange on 1 June 2006 to simplify branding by France Télécom: this merging of companies has created a single brand offering mobile telecommunications and internet services.
