= The 4th Coming =

1998 video game

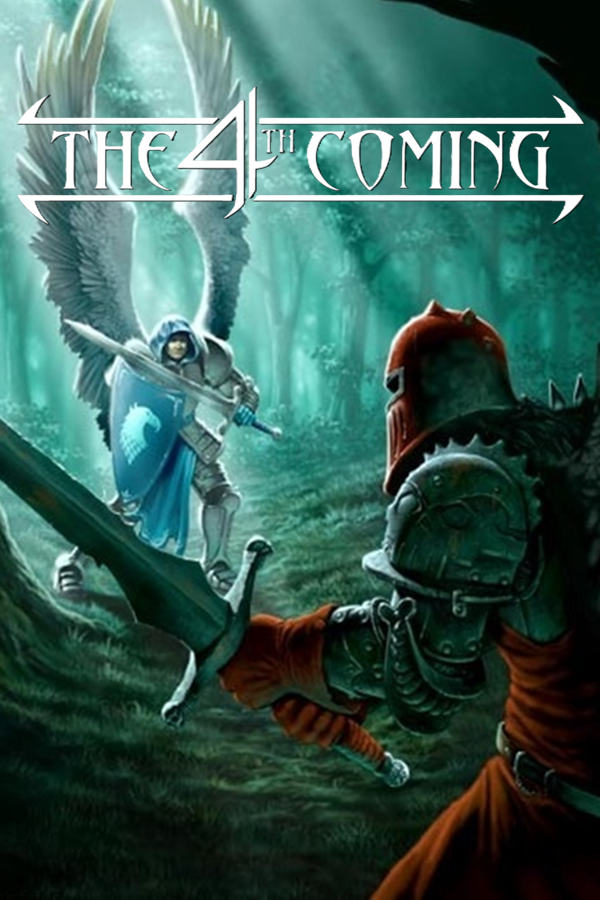
- Developers: Vircom Interactive (1998-2003); T4CV2 (2004-2007); T4CDEV (2009-2019); T4C Next Chapter (2020-2023); T4C (2024-present)
- Publishers: Vircom Interactive (1998-2006); Dialsoft (2006-present)
- Directors: Sylvain Durocher; Richard Lachance; Marc Frega; Greg Keel
- Designers: Jean Carrieres; Francis Lahaie
- Programmers: Benoit Thomas; Francois Leblanc; Éric Langlois; Carl Vachon; Orcafleches; Mestoph
- Artists: Mathieu Rivest; Erik Ashley; Jonathan Pelletier
- Composer: Erik Ashley
- Engine: DirectDraw
- Platform: Windows
- Release: May 11, 1999
- Genre: MMORPG
- Mode: Multiplayer

The 4th Coming (abbreviated T4C), also known in French as La Quatrième Prophétie, is a massively multiplayer online role-playing game (MMORPG) originally produced by Vircom Interactive for Windows-based operating systems. Released on May 11, 1999, Vircom initially opened the first server for testing before releasing server licenses. There are no known release notes for versions prior to the release of version 1.0. The 4th Coming was later purchased by Dialsoft, which sells server licenses and continues to develop the game under the official project name T4C Next Chapter.

== Setting ==
The game takes place in the world of Althea, which spans three islands: Arakas, Raven's Dust, and Stoneheim. The setting is a time when a prophesied "4th coming" is to occur, which influences the storyline and the quests that players undertake.

== Gameplay ==
Players begin by creating a human character. After choosing a name and gender, they answer a series of questions that distribute attribute points. These questions have five possible answers, where four answers increase different attributes, and one provides no benefit. Players can repeatedly "roll" attribute scores until satisfied, though maximum attribute values are influenced by their previous answers. Players earn experience points and level up by completing tasks given by NPC characters. The game features a magic system including magic weapons and various spells, divided into elemental classes such as air and fire.

== History ==
Vircom Interactive, a subdivision of Vircom, first published The 4th Coming in 1998. In May 2000, version 1.10 was released, introducing a new interface, groups, private chat rooms, and other improvements.

In June 2003, a deal was finalized between Pole, SARL of France and Vircom to give Pole exclusive operating rights for the European hosting of the game. The game was played by over 500,000 registered players in 2002.

In September 2003, Vircom's original CEO and founder Sylvain Durocher filed a piracy complaint in Canada.

In July 2006, Marc Frega (owner of Dialsoft) acquired The 4th Coming from emailing and messaging company Vircom. Dialsoft is now in charge of selling server licenses and continues to expand the game through the V2 project available to all servers willing to pay for it. Dialsoft allows other server versions to exist provided they maintain their server license.

== Development ==
The 4th Coming was developed using the DirectDraw engine, which allowed for 2D graphics that were highly detailed for its time. The development team focused on creating an immersive world with a rich storyline, and the game's art direction was influenced by both Western and Eastern fantasy traditions. The game also incorporated a robust sound design, with composer Erik Ashley providing a memorable soundtrack that complemented the game's atmosphere.

== Community and Influence ==
The 4th Coming has maintained a dedicated community of players over the years. Various fan sites and forums have been established to share strategies, updates, and community events. The game's influence can be seen in the way it inspired other MMORPGs to focus on detailed storylines and immersive worlds. The community has also contributed to the game's ongoing development through feedback and suggestions.

== Technical specifications ==
When The 4th Coming was first released in 1999, the recommended system requirements included a Pentium II 300 MHz processor, 64 MB of RAM, and a 2 MB SVGA graphics card. Over time, as the game received updates and additional content, the system requirements increased to accommodate improved graphics and more complex gameplay mechanics. By the mid-2000s, it was recommended to have at least a Pentium III 800 MHz processor, 128 MB of RAM, and a 16 MB graphics card to run the game smoothly.

== Reception ==
Strana Igr gave a score of 7.0 out of 10 and said the game is easy to control but lacks originality. PC Joker gave a score of 64% and also highlighted the lack of originality. The graphics were described as poorly animated but the music and sound effects were said to be more appealing. In 2011, Jeuxvideo.com said the game stands the test of time thanks to its addictive gameplay and devoted community. The game was often compared to Ultima Online.
