= Byte Information Exchange =

American electronic bulletin board system

BYTE Information eXchange (BIX) was an online service created by BYTE.

== History ==
BYTE in the October 1984 issue announced BYTEnet, "a project in computer conferencing", with 200 beta testers who received free service during the "experiment". The magazine formally announced BIX in the June 1985 issue, offering an introductory sign-up fee of $25, and evening and weekend charges of $6 per hour of connect time: the service offered direct numbers in San Francisco, Los Angeles, Chicago, and Boston. It was a text-only Bulletin Board System-style site running the CoSy conferencing software. BIX originally ran on an Areté multiprocessor system based on the Motorola 68000, then 68020. By June 1986 the company had more than 6000 subscribers, and the magazine printed excerpts of BIX discussions. In 1987, with 17,000 users, BIX moved to a Pyramid 9820 running DC/OSx. When the Pyramid became too expensive to run, BIX was ported to a DEC Alpha server. McGraw-Hill also used the same software internally.

BYTE staff and writers such as Jerry Pournelle were active on the service, and invitations for further discussion were printed with many articles in the magazine. Access was via local dial-in or for additional hourly charges, the Tymnet X.25 network. Monthly rates were initially $13/month for the account and $1/hour for X.25 access. Unlike CompuServe, access at higher speeds was not surcharged. Later, gateways permitted email communication outside the system. BIX was acquired by the Delphi online service in 1992.

In the mid-1990s, the Internet became more available to the masses and Usenet, mailing lists, and competing services such as CompuServe and America Online were able to offer flat-rate services, which adversely affected BIX membership levels. In the late-1990s, as the Internet became more mainstream, membership and activity plummeted forcing BIX to cut pricing to $40 per year, with no per hour connection charge by using the Internet for access.

Lower prices and full page ads in BYTE were unsuccessful in turning the service around. Consequently, BIX was shut down in 2001. Some members created a new service, based on an open-source version of CoSy, called NLZ (Noise Level Zero) where they continued what remained of the service, with many of the same conferences and topics that were active at the end of Delphi's ownership until 2018.

Other CoSy-based conferencing systems of the same era still survive including CIX.
