= Pipex =

1990–2008 British Internet service provider

Pipex Internet Limited
- Type: Subsidiary
- Industry: Telecommunications and mass media
- Founded: 1990
- Defunct: 2008
- Fate: Acquired
- Successor: Daisy Group
- Headquarters: London, England
- Products: Communications

Pipex (/ˈpaɪpɛks/ PY-peks) was the United Kingdom's first commercial Internet service provider (ISP). It was formed in 1990 and helped to develop the ISP market in the UK. In 1992 it began operating a 64k transatlantic leased line and built a connection to the UK government's JANET network. One of its first customers was Demon Internet which popularised dial up modem based internet access in the UK. It was also one of the key players in the development of the London Internet Exchange through a meeting with BT in 1994.

The company went through a number of mergers and acquisitions and by 2007 had dropped to be the sixth largest ISP in the UK. The Pipex name was used by a number of companies within the group, which were gradually renamed following the sale of its home broadband business to Tiscali UK in 2007. In 2009, the former Pipex Wireless business, rebranded as Freedom4, bought the former Pipex Business, known as Vialtus. Freedom4 also purchased Daisy Group through a reverse takeover, and the three companies were brought together as Daisy.

== History ==
=== Formation ===
The company was formed as the first commercial ISP in the UK by Unipalm in 1990 as The Public I.P. Exchange Ltd (PIPEX), founded by Peter Dawe. In mid 1992, it began operating a 64k transatlantic leased line to UUNET and another to JANET. One of its first customers was Demon Internet, shortly followed by the BBC.

In November 1994, Keith Mitchell, then chief technical officer of PIPEX, initiated a meeting with BT to discuss the creation of a London-based Internet exchange. Pipex donated a Cisco Catalyst 1200 Network switch which formed the basis of the London Internet Exchange (LINX).

Logo as UUNET Pipex

Unipalm Pipex was sold to UUNet in November 1995 for £150 million and became UUNet/Pipex.

The brand became known as Worldcom Pipex, after UUnet merged with MFS, which is later acquired by WorldCom before merging with MCI to form MCI WorldCom, later renaming back to MCI which was then taken over by Verizon Communications. Pipex retained contracts with Verizon with regards to the network structure. David Rickards and family acquired the PIPEX brand for an undisclosed sum and the new company PIPEX Internet Ltd was born.

In January 2002 saw the first push to provide digital subscriber line (DSL) lines instead of traditional modems and Pipex invested £2 million to get 40,000 DSL users online.

=== Reorganisation ===
In October 2003 Pipex was acquired by GX Networks plc, which retained the Pipex name by renaming itself Pipex Communications plc. In September 2006, Pipex purchased Toucan from IDT Telecom for £24 million, and Cable & Wireless' Bulldog Broadband for £12 million.

Pipex sold its home broadband business and the rights to use the Pipex name to Tiscali UK in July 2007 for £210 million. As a consequence, Pipex Wireless was renamed Freedom4 in October 2007, followed by Pipex Business in February 2008 which was renamed Vialtus. Pipex Communications reverted to the GX Networks name in March 2008.

Freedom4 agreed to purchase Vialtus and Daisy Group in July 2009, performing a reverse takeover of Daisy. The former Pipex residential business, as part of Tiscali, was integrated into TalkTalk when Tiscali UK was itself acquired by TalkTalk's parent The Carphone Warehouse in 2009.

== See also ==
- Internet in the United Kingdom § History
