= Freeserve =

British Internet service provider, 1998–2001

Freeserve.com plc
- Type: Public company
- Industry: Internet and Communications
- Founded: 1998
- Defunct: 2001
- Fate: Acquired
- Successor: EE previously Orange UK; Wanadoo
- Headquarters: Hemel Hempstead, England, UK
- Products: Internet service

Freeserve was a British Internet service provider, which was founded in 1998. At its height, the company became a constituent of the FTSE 100 Index, before merging into the Wanadoo group in 2001. It then became a subsidiary of France Telecom, who owned a controlling interest in Wanadoo. Wanadoo rebranded over time and eventually became Orange Home UK.

Since the merger of Orange UK into EE, Orange Home UK was integrated as a service within EE's range of services.

== History ==
The company was founded in 1998 as a project between Dixons Group plc and Leeds-based hosting provider Planet Online to provide free Internet access to customers buying new home PCs from Dixons stores. John Pluthero was described as the "Mr Freeserve" who became the CEO of his "pet project", and led it to a stock market flotation in July 1999.

Initially the concept was called Channel 6 and was between Packard Bell and Planet Online. Packard Bell pulled out and Dixons (who resold their PCs) stepped in as joint partner.

Freeserve was one of the first of the UK's ISPs to dispense with the usual monthly subscription fee for Internet access, and instead to collect a proportion of the standard telephone line charges. This made it more appealing and affordable to the masses and paved way for more people gaining internet access in the UK. (At the time virtually all Internet access in the UK was by dial-up access via BT lines.) With Freeserve however each customer had 10 megabytes of webspace, and could split the email address into as many names as desired, using a simple extension of the normal email naming protocols (user@freeserve.co.uk could subdivide into email for dad@user.freeserve.co.uk and mum@user.freeserve.co.uk etc.).

At the time, not having a standing charge for such a comprehensive service, especially the webspace, was a radical step. Further revenue was obtained from advertisements on Freeserve's homepage, which was set as the default page in the customers' web browsers upon installing the Freeserve connection software. BT sought to challenge Freeserve's business plan by arguing that under the regulatory model (known as Number Translation Services, or NTS), it should receive more money for each call, and in January 1999 Oftel announced that it would carry out a review.

Freeserve floated on the stock market in July 1999 (as Freeserve.com plc), at which point it had approximately 1.3 million subscribers and was valued at between £1.31 billion and £1.51 billion.

By September 2000, Freeserve had more than two million active subscribers. This was vastly more than the incumbent telephone provider BT, something that was unique for a European ISP.

Freeserve was bought by the France Télécom-owned company Wanadoo in 2000 for £1.65 billion.

Freeserve began to trial the emerging ADSL broadband service in early 2000. The original equipment supplied was a rack-type hard-wired modem and a separate router. A year later, the supplied end-user equipment was just a small USB-based modem, the Thomson SpeedTouch 330 (previously known as the Speedtouch USB). Later, as Orange, they supplied a wireless ADSL modem router, the Orange-badged Siemens SE572, with one Ethernet port.

== Successive rebrandings ==
After being bought by Wanadoo in 2001, Freeserve first had its name changed to Wanadoo UK plc on 28 April 2004. Following a new rebranding exercise in June 2006, Freeserve and Wanadoo UK then formed part of the UK operation of Orange, and were known as Orange Home UK plc. In 2010 Orange UK and T-Mobile UK merged to form EE which was a joint venture between Deutsche Telekom and France Télécom. Orange's broadband service was then rebranded as EE Broadband on 30 October 2012.

== Deactivation ==
In August 2007, Orange started a process to purge unused Freeserve accounts from its system.

Originally Freeserve accounts would be deactivated after ninety days if the dial-up number was not accessed (hence not generating any revenue for Orange). Customers would then receive an error message when trying to access their Freeserve email via another connection, but could reactivate the account before it was deleted by visiting the Orange website.

Orange extended the deactivation period to 260 days in 2007 but under the new regime users' accounts and all email were deleted permanently from Orange's servers after a 30-day warning was issued.

The account deactivation process ceased on 28 February 2012.

In 2016 the service hosting the original Freeserve personal webspace was deactivated, ending the anomaly of orphaned pages that could not be edited, the dial-up service allowing editing having ceased some years before.

In early 2017 all email users were advised that the email service was also withdrawn.
