= Ziegler =

Ziegler is a common German-language surname meaning "brick-maker" and may refer to the following people:

== Actors ==
- Daniela Ziegler (born 1948), German actress
- Ernst Ziegler (1894–1974), German actor
- Joseph Ziegler (actor) (1953–2025), Canadian actor and theatre director
- Lulu Ziegler (1903–1973), Danish actress
- Mackenzie Ziegler (born 2004), American dancer and actress
- Maddie Ziegler (born 2002), American dancer and actress
- Matilda Ziegler (born 1964), English actress

== Artists ==
- Adolf Ziegler (1892–1959), German painter, favoured by Adolf Hitler
- Johann Ziegler (1749–1802), German-Austrian painter and copperplate engraver
- Samuel P. Ziegler (1882–1967), American painter, educator, musician
- Yvonne Ziegler (1902–1988), French resistance fighter, artist, educator
- Zio Ziegler (born 1988), American visual artist and graphic artist

== Authors ==
- Alexander Ziegler (German writer) (1822–1887), German writer and economist
- Alexander Ziegler (Swiss writer) (1944–1987), Swiss author and actor
- Calvin Ziegler (1854–1930), Pennsylvanian poet
- Christiana Mariana von Ziegler (1695–1760), German poet
- Jennifer Ziegler, American author
- Leopold Ziegler (1881–1958), German philosoph

== Fictional characters ==
- Morgan Ziegler, a.k.a. Zitz in the Battletoads series
- Toby Ziegler, White House Communications Director in American TV series The West Wing
- Angela Ziegler, a.k.a. Mercy in Overwatch
- Victor Ziegler, wealthy member of New York's elite in Eyes Wide Shut
- Werner Ziegler, German construction engineer in Better Call Saul
- Margarethe Ziegler, wife of Werner
- Yehezkel Ziegler, Tel Aviv municipality member in Blaumilch Canal

== Military ==
- David Ziegler (1748–1811), military officer of the Continental Army, Society of the Cincinnati
- Joachim Ziegler (1904–1945), SS-Brigadeführer and recipient of the Knight's Cross of the Iron Cross with Oak Leaves
- Werner Ziegler (1916–2001), German officer in World War II
- William Smith Ziegler (1911–1999), Canadian general in World War II

== Musicians ==
- Anne Ziegler (1910–2003), English singer, wife of Webster Booth
- Klaus Martin Ziegler (1929–1993), German choral conductor, organist and Protestant church musician
- Delores Ziegler (born 1951), American mezzo-soprano
- Pablo Ziegler (born 1944), Argentine composer
- Adrian von Ziegler (born 1989), Swiss musician

== Politicians ==
- A. H. Ziegler (1889–1972), American lawyer and politician
- Bridget Ziegler (born 1982), American politician and right-wing activist
- Christian Ziegler (politician) (born 1983), American politician
- Christin Ziegler (born 1989), German politician
- Bob Ziegler (1921–1991), American lawyer and politician, son of A. H. Ziegler
- Dagmar Ziegler (born 1960), German politician
- Erich Ziegler (1914–2004), German politician and anti-Nazi resistance activist
- Justin Ziegler, Canadian politician
- Kay-Uwe Ziegler (born 1963), German politician
- Maximilian Ziegler (born 1992), German politicians
- Ron Ziegler (1939–2003), Richard Nixon's press secretary and assistant to the president

== Religion ==
- Albert Ziegler (theologian) (1927–2022), Swiss Roman-Catholic theologian, ethicist and author
- Gregorius Thomas Ziegler (1770–1852), Benedictine monk and bishop of Linz
- Ignaz Ziegler (1861–1948), Austrian rabbi
- Jacob Ziegler (c. 1470 – 1549), German humanist and theologian, itinerant scholar of geography and cartographer
- Reuven Ziegler (born 1968), American–Israeli modern orthodox rabbi, author, editor and lecturer
- Yael Ziegler (born 1970), American–Israeli modern orthodox author, Tanakh scholar, and educator

== Scientists and academics ==
- Albert Ziegler (born 1961), German psychologist and professor
- Daniel Ziegler (1804–1876), American clergyman and entomologist
- Günter M. Ziegler (born 1963), German mathematician
- Heinz Otto Ziegler (1903–1944), German speaking Czech political scientist
- Jean Ziegler (1934–2026), Swiss professor of sociology, author and politician, active in the anti-globalization movement
- Johann Heinrich Ziegler (1857–1936), Swiss dye chemist
- John Bosley Ziegler, American physician who pioneered the athletic use of the steroid Dianabol
- Karl Ziegler (1898–1973), German chemist and Nobel laureate
- Peter Ziegler (1928–2013), Swiss geologist
- Philip Ziegler (1929–2023), British biographer and historian
- Regina G. Ziegler, American biochemist and nutritional epidemiologist
- Tamar Ziegler (born 1971), Israeli mathematician
- Willi Ziegler (1929–2002), a German paleontologist
- William Ziegler (1843–1905), American industrialist, co-founder of the Royal Baking Powder Company, Arctic explorer

== Sports ==
- Ava Marie Ziegler (born 2006), American figure skater
- Brad Ziegler (born 1979), American baseball player
- Dave Ziegler (born 1977), American football executive
- Edi Ziegler (1930–2020), German road cyclist
- Gus Ziegler (1875–1960), American college football coach
- John Ziegler Jr. (1934–2018), American lawyer and former president of the National Hockey League
- Kate Ziegler (born 1988), American swimmer
- Larry Ziegler (born 1939), American golfer
- Marc Ziegler (born 1976), German footballer
- Patrick Ziegler (born 1990), German-Australian footballer
- Reto Ziegler (born 1986), Swiss footballer
- Reto Ziegler (curler), Swiss curler
- Thomas Ziegler (ice hockey) (born 1978), Swiss hockey player
- Thomas Ziegler (cyclist) (born 1980), German road racing cyclist

== Technicians ==
- Bernard Ziegler (1933–2021), French, former Airbus director of engineering, son of Henri Ziegler
- Hans K. Ziegler (1911–1999), German pioneer in the field of satellite technology

== Others ==
- Anne Ziegler (1910–2003), English singer (born Irene Eastwood)
- Christian Ziegler (fl. 2000s–2020s), German photojournalist
- Elizabeth Ziegler (1854–1942), Canadian schoolteacher
- Henri Ziegler (1906–1998), French, Airbus first CEO
- John Ziegler (talk show host) (born 1967), radio talk show host in Los Angeles
- Mary Ziegler (born 1982), American legal historian
- Mel Ziegler and Patricia Ziegler, American businesspeople
- Regina Ziegler (1944–2026), German producer
- Garrett Ziegler, American political aide

== Other uses ==
- Ziegler, Wisconsin, ghost town, United States
- Ziegler House (Ketchikan, Alaska), NRHP-listed in Ketchikan Gateway Borough, Alaska, associated with A. H. and Bob Ziegler
- Ziegler–Natta catalyst, chemical reagent named after Karl Ziegler and Giulio Natta
- Ziegler School of Rabbinic Studies, graduate program at the American Jewish University in Los Angeles
- Ziegler Cray Y-MP M90 NSA supercomputer, now at National Cryptologic Museum
- Ziegler & Co., manufacturer and distributor of Persian carpets
- Zig Ziglar, American personality
