= Sigler =

Sigler is a surname. Notable people with the surname include:

- Bunny Sigler (1941–2017), pop and R&B songwriter and record producer
- Eisig D. Sigler or Eugen Relgis (1895–1987), Romanian writer, pacifist philosopher and anarchist militant
- Franklin E. Sigler (1924–1995), American who received the Medal of Honor for his actions in the Iwo Jima campaign
- Harold Sigler, American politician
- Hollis Sigler (1948–2001), Chicago-based artist whose paintings addressed her life with breast cancer
- Jamie-Lynn Sigler (born 1981), American actress and singer
- Kim Sigler (1894–1953), American politician
- Maurice Sigler (1901–1961), American banjoist and songwriter
- Scott Sigler, contemporary American author of science fiction and horror
- Victoria Sigler (born 1951), judge of the Miami-Dade County Circuit Court

== See also ==
- Hot Sigler Springs, unincorporated community in Lake County, California
- Seigler
- Siegler
- Zeigler (disambiguation)
- Ziegler
