= Electronic messaging =

Electronic messaging may refer to:

== One-to-one-communication ==
- Instant message (on a computer network)
- Personal message (on a computer network)
- Text message (on a cellular phone network)
- SMTP (on a computer network)
- Email (on a computer Network)
- Voicemail (using the PSTN)
- Fax (using the PSTN)
- Pager (using the PSTN)

== One-to-many communication ==
- Bulletin board system (on a computer network)
- Internet forum (on a computer network)
- Usenet newsgroup (on a computer network)
