= McBride Sisters =

African American winemakers

- Founded: 2005
- Key people: Robin & Andréa McBride
- Known for: McBride Sisters Collection; Black Girl Magic; SHE CAN
- Website: mcbridesisters.com

McBride Sisters Wine Company is a wine company in the United States.

The company was founded in 2005 by Robin and Andréa McBride, who first met as adults and discovered a shared interest in winemaking. The brand uses grapes from both California and New Zealand and produces bottled and canned wines.

According to Wine Spectator, as of 2020 it was the largest Black-owned wine company in the US by volume.

== Family history ==
The McBrides are half-sisters who grew up far apart in winemaking regions, unaware of each other until they were adults. Andréa was raised in Marlborough, New Zealand. At the age of six, she was raised by her uncle and a foster family after her mother died of breast cancer. Robin grew up in Monterey, California. The sisters shared a biological father, Kelly McBride, with whom they had had little contact while growing up. Before he died in 1996, he asked his family to find and connect his two daughters. Following a lengthy search by his family, Robin and Andréa met for first time in 1999 at LaGuardia Airport in New York. They soon discovered a shared interest in winemaking.

== Business history ==
Robin and Andrea McBride started their business as a boutique import firm with a limited selection of New Zealand wines. In 2010, they founded EcoLove, a brand focused on sustainable wines, sourced from vineyards throughout New Zealand. In 2015, they started Truvée, a brand focused on California Central Coast wines, in partnership with Diageo Chateau & Estate Wines. Starting in 2017, all their wines from New Zealand and California were brought together under the McBride Sisters Collection and sold in grocery stores across the United States. In the 12 months leading up to October 2020, the McBride Sisters had sold 35,000 cases of wine at retail outlets, according to Nielsen, making it the largest Black-owned wine company by volume. In October 2020, Wine Spectator reported that McBride Sisters had $5.43 million in annual sales.

According to the company, by November 2020, the McBride Sisters brand was carried in 2,697 stores in the United States, up from only 84 stores before May of that year. As of December 2020, McBride Sisters wines were sold at select Target retail stores, and was also marketed nationally at Walmart and Kroger, in addition to being sold direct through the company web site. In March 2023 the company partnered with Alaskan Airlines, offering Black Girl Magic, to their first-class passengers. In addition, the company partnered with Ghirardelli Chocolate Company in 2026, where the company's Brut Rose was a featured pairing for a Valentine's Day promotion.

== Wines ==
The company's main labels include the McBride Sisters Collection, which includes wines from the Central Coast of California and from New Zealand, and Black Girl Magic. In 2019, the company launched a line of canned wine, SHE CAN, which it marketed as eco-friendly.

The Black Girl Magic Collection debuted in 2018. The first wine in the collection was a riesling. Another is a red blend of merlot and cabernet sauvignon. The line's rosé was awarded "Best for TV Binges" by the editors of Cosmopolitan magazine in the Second Annual Cosmo Wine Awards. In December 2020, Washington Post wine columnist Dave McIntyre recommended the Black Girl Magic Sparkling Brut as "delicious".

== Corporate social responsibility ==
As of 2015, McBride Sisters had a team that was 80 percent female, including their head winemaker and vineyard director. They are members of the Association of African American Vintners (AAAV), which was founded in 2002.

The company sponsors a professional development fund which awards scholarships to women. The scholarship fund initially focused on helping women in the wine and spirits industry, but was later expanded to include female entrepreneurs across all industries, and provides mentoring and leadership coaching in addition to financial assistance.

In 2020, the company and other Black-owned businesses participated in a social media Blackout Tuesday; McBride Sisters shared a list of 86 Black vintners on Instagram. The post went viral by after it was shared by celebrities including former professional basketball player Dwyane Wade and actor Gabrielle Union.

According to the Boston Globe, McBride Sisters is "one of the few Black-owned wine labels that encourages consumers to be socially conscious."
