= Vincenzo Aiutino =

French serial killer

- Born: 10 March 1970 (age 56); Zofingen, Switzerland
- Other name: "The man with the fifty affairs"
- Conviction: Murder (×3)
- Penalty: Life imprisonment

Details
- Victims: 3
- Span of crimes: 1991–1992
- Country: France
- State: Lorraine
- Date apprehended: 26 February 1992
- Imprisoned at: Maison centrale d'Ensisheim (Ensisheim Central Prison)

Vincenzo Aiutino (born 10 March 1970) is a French serial killer popularly known as "the man with fifty affairs". Convicted of three murders in the Longwy commune, he was sentenced to life imprisonment on 6 March 1998, along with 18 years of preventive detention without parole.

== Biography ==
Aiutino was born in Switzerland on 10 March 1970. He was neglected by his father Domenico, a mason from Sicily. Later, the family moved to Belgium. In 1975, Aiutino witnessed his father raping his 7-year-old sister.

Aiutino worked at a construction site in Belgium as a teenager but was briefly admitted to a psychiatric institution in 1985 after he exposed himself to a woman. In 1986, at the age of sixteen, he abandoned his studies and left school. Aiutino's criminal sexual impulses became more pronounced. At the age of 18, he was charged with the sexual assault of a minor, and at 19, he was imprisoned for violent theft.

In July 1990, Aiutino married Marie-Antoinette Calla, a divorcée with a young son.

== Crimes and investigation ==
On 6 August 1991, Isabelle Le Nénan, a 20-year-old commercial attaché, left her workplace in Longwy-Haut to dine with a friend. Upon reaching the parking lot of the Auchan supermarket in Mont-Saint-Martin, she was approached by a stranger who lured her back to a construction site under the pretence of helping him carry a heavy object. There, Aiutino exposed himself and tried to rape her. A few months later, two hunters discovered a nude body in an advanced stage of decomposition in the woods of Turpange. An autopsy revealed that the body was Le Nénan's, and was identified primarily by the jewelry found on her corpse. She died of a skull fracture caused by an iron bar hitting her head.

On 13 September 1991, Isabelle Christophe, a 21-year-old cashier at the same Auchan supermarket in Mont-Saint-Martin, was also approached by Aiutino. He led her to the cellar on his building site under the same pretence of helping him lift a heavy object, where he raped, strangled, and murdered her by hitting her with an iron rod. While the murder was originally considered a potential suicide, police soon began investigating the death as a sexual crime, after reviewing the files of sex offenders in the region. This led them to investigate four men, one of whom was Aiutino, who at the time worked as a mason at a construction site near the supermarket. On 2 December 1991, inspectors from the regional police of Nancy interrogated him, but due to a lack of evidence, they released him after 10 hours in custody.

On 25 February 1992, Aiutino punctured the tire of Bernadette Bour, a 40-year-old medical sales representative, and started helping her repair it. Aiutino then offered Bernadette to follow her to a place where she could wash her hands, and then led her to the basement on the premise. Aiutino followed Bour, attempted to rape her, and then beat her to death with an iron rod. He disposed of him body in Allondrelle-la-Malmaison near his home on Joseph Labbé Street. Police did not immediately investigate the crime, enabling Aiutino to flee.

The Belgian police later arrested Aiutino at his father's house in Aubange. Aiutino initially confessed his crimes, but then withdrew his confession and accused his father. This delayed Aiutino's extradition to France, where penalties were more severe. Aiutino was finally extradited in 1993. He accused his brother of the three murders.

== List of victims ==
Murder		Discovery		Identity	Age	Activity / Profession
Date	Place	Date	Place	Identity	Age	Activity / Profession
6 August 1991	Parking lot of the Auchan on Mont-Saint-Martin	21 October 1991	Turpange Forest	Isabelle Le Nénan	20	Commercial attaché at Bis agency
13 September 1991	Longwy	28 February 1992	Turpange Forest	Isabelle Christophe	21	Cashier at the Auchan grocery
25 February 1992	Longwy	February 1992	Woods of Allondrelle-la-Malmaison	Bernadette Bour	40	Medical Visiter

== Trial and conviction ==
On 2 March 1998, Aiutino was tried before the cour d'assises of Meurthe-et-Moselle in Nancy. Psychiatric experts diagnosed him as an incurable psychopath, fully responsible for his actions. Aiutino confessed solely to the murder of Bour and was sentenced to life imprisonment on 6 March 1998, with a minimum imprisonment of 18 years. By the end of the trial, he had served five years of detention with a possible release in 2011. In 2011, it was rumoured that he was released, which was proven incorrect.

Aiutino assaulted several supervisors in the Nancy Prison in November 1998. Consequently, he was sentenced to an additional five months.

== Press articles ==
- "Triple murderer" Article published on February 29, 1992, in L'Humanité.
- "Relief in the country after murderer of three young Longwy women arrested in Aubange: an Italian who will be extradited" Article by Annie Gaspard published February 29, 1992 in Le Soir.
- "Perpetuity for Aiutino" Article by Marcel Gay published March 6, 1998 in L'Est républicain.
- "Vincenzo Aiutino, I still dream of him!" Article by Mr. Durant published on September 14, 2011, in Sud Presse.

== TV documentaries ==
- "Vincenzo Aiutino, the man with 50 affairs" in February 2010 and May 2011 in Get the Accused presented by Christophe Hondelatte on France 2.
- "Vincenzo Aiutino case: the missing of Longwy" (first report) on March 10, 2018, in Chroniques criminelles on TFX.

== Radio show ==
- "The case of Vincenzo Aiutino" February 20, 2018 in The Double Hour of Jacques Pradel on RTL.

== See also ==
=== Related articles ===
- List of French serial killers
- List of serial killers by country

=== External links ===
- Archives on the INA website
- Document gathering the articles published in L'Est républicain (format PDF).
