= Private message =

Mode of electronic communication

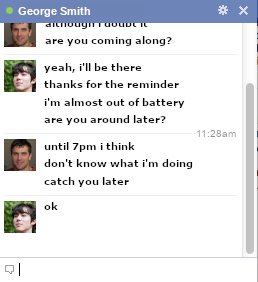
Messages sent between users of Facebook on the Facebook Chat platform

In computer networking, a private message (PM), or direct message (DM), refers to a private communication, often text-based, sent or received by a user of a private communication channel on any given platform. Unlike public posts, PMs are only viewable by the participants. Long a function present on IRCs and Internet forums, private channels for PMs have also been prevalent features on instant messaging (IM) and on social media networks. It may be either synchronous (e.g. on an IM) or asynchronous (e.g. on an Internet forum).

The term private message (PM) originated as a feature on internet forums, while the term direct message (DM) originated as a feature on Twitter. Due to the popularity of the latter service, DM has since been appropriated by other platforms, such as Instagram, and is often genericized in popular usage.

== Overview ==
There are two main types of private messages, and one obscure type:

- One type includes those found on IRCs and Internet forums, as well as on social media services like Twitter, Facebook, and Instagram, where the focus is public posting, PMs allow users to communicate privately without leaving the platform.
- The second type are those relayed through instant messaging platforms such as WhatsApp and Snapchat, where users join the networks primarily to exchange PMs.
- A third type, peer-to-peer messaging, occurs when users create and own the infrastructure used to transmit and store the messages; while features vary depending on application, they give the user full control over the data they transmit. An example of software that enables this kind of messaging is Classified-ads.

Besides serving as a tool to connect privately with friends and family, PMs have gained momentum in the workplace. Working professionals use PMs to reach coworkers in other spaces and increase efficiency during meetings. Although useful, using PMs in the workplace may blur the boundary between work and private lives.

Some common forms of private messaging today include Facebook messaging (sometimes referred to as "inboxing"), Twitter direct messaging, and Instagram direct messaging. These forms of private messaging provide a private space on a usually public site. For instance, most activity on Twitter is public, but Twitter DMs provide a private space for communication between two users. This differs from mediums like email, texting, and Snapchat, where most or all activity is always private. Modern forms of private messaging may include multimedia messages, such as pictures or videos.

== History ==
Email was first developed to send messages between different computers on ARPANET in 1971. Access to ARPANET was primarily limited to universities and other research institutions. Starting in 1983 or 1984, FidoNet allowed home computer users to send and receive email via bulletin board systems. Information services such as CompuServe, America Online, and Prodigy also helped to popularizes online messaging. The advent of the public World Wide Web in 1993 increased access to email via internet service providers, and later via webmail. Instant messaging systems became popular in the mid 1990s, as Internet access improved and personal computers became more common. The introduction of Skype in 2003 popularized Internet-based voice and video messaging. Direct messaging is now a feature of all major social networking services.

== Privacy concerns ==
In January 2014, Matthew Campbell and Michael Hurley filed a class-action lawsuit against Facebook for breaching the Electronic Communications Privacy Act. They alleged that private messages which contained URLs were being read and used to generate profit, through data mining and user profiling, and that it was misleading for Facebook to refer to the functionality as "private" with the implication that the communication was "free from surveillance".

In 2012, some Facebook users misinterpreted a redesign of the Facebook wall as publicly sharing private messages from 2008–2009. These were found to be public wall posts from those years, made at a time when it was not possible to like or comment on a wall post, making the notes look like private messages.
