= Ziegler House =

Ziegler House may refer to:

== Denmark ==
- Ziegler House, Copenhagen, a listed building

== United States ==
- Ziegler House (Ketchikan, Alaska), listed on the National Register of Historic Places
- Ziegler House (Syracuse, New York), listed on the National Register of Historic Places
- Isaac Ziegler House, in Knoxville, Tennessee
- William Ziegler House, on East 63rd Street, New York City, New York
- William and Helen Ziegler House, on East 55th Street, New York City, New York; renamed the SUNY Global Center, it is now the site of the Levin Institute of the State University of New York

== See also ==
- Zeigler House (disambiguation)
- Ziegler Estate
