= The Republic of Tea =

American tea company

- Type: Private
- Industry: Beverage
- Founded: 1992; 34 years ago in Novato, California, U.S.
- Founders: Mel Ziegler, Patricia Ziegler, Bill Rosenzweig
- Headquarters: Larkspur, California, U.S.
- Products: Loose-Leaf Tea; Tea Bags; Tea-Related Products
- Owner: Ron Rubin
- Website: RepublicofTea.com

The Republic of Tea is a privately owned American tea company based in Larkspur, California.

== History ==
The company was founded in 1992 by Mel Ziegler, Patricia Ziegler, and Bill Rosenzweig. The Zieglers co-founded Banana Republic and ZoZa.com. In 1994, they sold the company to Ron Rubin. Rubin's son, Todd Rubin, joined the company in 2007 and succeeded his father as president in 2015. Ron Rubin currently serves as The Republic of Tea's Executive Chairman and Minister of Tea.

The Republic of Tea designates its employees as "ministers", its customers as "citizens", and its retail outlets as "embassies".

== Practices ==
The company sources several of its teas from biodynamic farms, a form of alternative agriculture based on pseudo-scientific and esoteric concepts. It also produces Sonoma Teas, which are made from dried grape skins.

In 2026, the company launched its first sparkling tea, a White Jasmine Sparkling Tea.
