= Leah Culver =

American computer scientist and entrepreneur

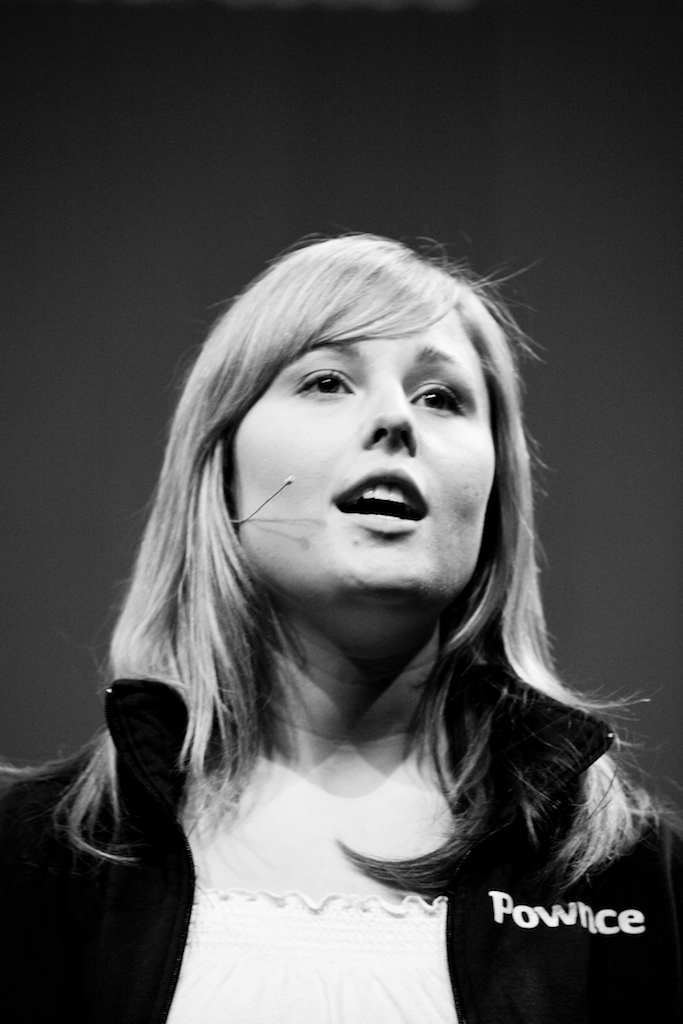
- Speaking in 2008 at The Next Web Conference (Amsterdam)
- Born: 1982 or 1983 (age 42–43)
- Education: University of Minnesota
- Occupation: Engineer
- Employer: Twitter, Inc.
- Website: leahculver.com

Leah Culver (born 1982 or 1983) is a computer programmer, startup founder, and angel investor.

== Education ==
Culver started as an art major at the University of Minnesota, but switched majors and earned a Bachelor of Science in computer science in 2006.

== Career ==
=== Early career ===
Culver is a co-author of a Python library for the open-standard authentication OAuth 1.0 and a co-author of OEmbed.

After graduating, she worked at the startups iLoop Mobile and Instructables. While working at Instructables, she received attention for etching company logos onto her laptop, which was funded by that ad space.

=== Pownce ===
In June 2007, she co-founded Pownce, with Digg's cofounder Kevin Rose and Digg's creative director Daniel Burka. Pownce was a micro-blogging site she programmed by herself as an experiment, described as "Twitter meets Napster". The company was funded with investments from Culver's friends and family, rather than venture capitalists. Pownce was acquired by Six Apart in December 2008. The website was shut down after the acquisition, but Culver implemented the technology she built for Pownce in TypePad and TypePad Motion. She left the company in February 2010.

=== Convore ===
After leaving Six Apart, Culver, along with Eric Florenzano and Eric Maguire, co-founded Convore, backed by Y Combinator. Convore focused primarily on an application for real-time chat, technology that was inspired by FriendFeed groups and 37 Signals’ Campfire . Convore pivoted into Grove, a chat service for workgroups.

=== Breaker ===
Culver was CTO of Breaker, a content-discovery platform for podcasts, which she co-founded with Erik Berlin in 2016. In January 2021, Culver and the Breaker team joined Twitter to help build Twitter Spaces. The Breaker application was scheduled for shutdown on January 15, 2021, but instead was taken over by Maple Media.

=== Investments ===
Culver has invested in technology such as Maker, a woman-led and minority-owned canned wine company, and Gowalla, a former Foursquare competitor turned augmented reality social application.

== Personal life ==
Culver is from Minnesota. She resides in San Francisco, California with her pug Mr. Wiggles.

In January 2020, Culver purchased 714 Steiner Street, the pink Painted Lady, for $3.55 million, well over its asking price. Culver purchased the home with the intention of renovating the property to its 130-year-old glory, while making the home more climate-friendly with the direction of architect David Armour. She underestimated the amount of work required and in May 2022 put the house up for sale at the original purchase price.

== Recognition ==
Culver was on the cover of MIT Technology Review in July 2008, was named among the Most Influential Women in Web 2.0 by Fast Company magazine in November 2008, was featured in the documentary The Startup Kids in 2012, and was among Girl Geek X's 30 Female CTOs to Watch list in 2019.
