= Siegler =

Siegler is a surname. Notable people with the surname include:

- Edward Siegler (1881–1942), American gymnast and athlete
- Franck Siegler (born 1967), French serial killer and multi-recidivist killer
- M. G. Siegler (born 1981), American blogger and venture capitalist
- Mark Siegler (born 1941), American physician
- Robert S. Siegler (born 1949), American psychologist
- Sammy Siegler (born 1973), American rock drummer

== See also ==
- Lear Siegler, created from a merger between the Siegler Corporation (Los Angeles) and Lear Avionics Inc. (Santa Monica) in 1961
- Siegler Corporation, created by a group of investors in 1952 in Chicago, Illinois
