= Zeigler =

Zeigler may refer to:

== Places ==
- Zeigler, Illinois, United States
- Zeigler, Indiana, United States
- Zeigler House (disambiguation), several places
- Mount Zeigler, in Marie Byrd Land in West Antarctica

== People with the surname ==
- Barbara Zeigler (born 1949), American artist
- Bernard P. Zeigler (born 1940), Canadian engineer and emeritus professor at the University of Arizona
- Cyd Zeigler (born 1973), American commentator and author in the field of sexuality and sports
- Dominique Zeigler (born 1984), former American football player
- Dusty Zeigler (born 1973), American football player
- Earle F. Zeigler (1919–2018), American and Canadian citizen, one of the founders of modern American Sport Studies
- Ernie Zeigler (born 1966), American college men's basketball coach
- Heidi Zeigler (born 1979), American actress
- Jim Zeigler (born 1948), American lawyer and politician
- Lee Woodward Zeigler (1868–1952), American illustrator and muralist
- Stanley Zeigler, American politician
- Wilbur G. Zeigler (1857–1935), American lawyer, writer, and Marlovian theory founder
- Zakai Zeigler (born 2002), American basketball player

== See also ==
- Ziegler
