= Zeigler House =

Zeigler House may refer to several places in the United States:

- Jesse R. Zeigler House, in Frankfort, Kentucky
- John Zeigler Farm House, in Latimore Township, Adams County, Pennsylvania
- Lantz-Zeigler House, in Hagerstown, Maryland

== See also ==
- Ziegler House (disambiguation)
- Zeigler (disambiguation)
