= Trina Turk =

American fashion designer

Trina Turk is an American fashion designer. Turk is known for her namesake fashion line inspired by Californian style.

== Background ==
Turk's mother taught her to sew at age 11. She later studied apparel design at the University of Washington. In 1995, Turk founded her namesake fashion line with husband Jonathan Skow. Turk's designs are inspired by Californian motifs and bold colors. Originally a contemporary womenswear line, the brand has expanded into a men's line "Mr. Turk", homeware and lifestyle pieces.

In 2002, Trina Turk opened her first namesake store, Trina Turk in Palm Springs. In 2008, the company accepted private investment to grow the line. By 2012, the company reportedly had $60million in annual sales and employed 125 employees. That year, the company collaborated with Banana Republic to produce a capsule collection. In 2013, the Trina Turk line made its debut at New York Fashion Week. That year, Turk designed a collection for Mattel's Barbie fashion doll.

In 2018, Turk's husband, Jonathan Skow, known as Mr. Turk, died after becoming paralyzed while swimming in Hawaii. That year, Turk stepped down from the chief executive officer role at Trina Turk, to serve as the brand's creative director.

In 2020, Turk celebrated 25 years of her fashion line with an anniversary capsule collection titled, 25 Years of Color.

In 2021, Turk led a campaign to relocate a Marilyn Monroe statue from outside of the Palm Springs Art Museum. In 2025, Turk's campaign was successful to relocate Forever Marylin to a downtown park.
