= Zumbl =

Online chat service

- Website type: Online chat, Avatars

Zumbl was an online chat service where users could converse with strangers anonymously. Users could "tag" each other on the basis of their conversations, which were indicative of their personality and were reflected in their avatars. Zumbl built users' pseudo-anonymous identities and matched them with strangers who shared common interests.

The service is now defunct.

== Awards ==
Zumbl won Samsung Innovation Awards 2012 on August 9 for the use of sentiment mining technology to find out the users' intent and depict them graphically through the users' avatars.

== See also ==
- Omegle
- Chatroulette
