= Franck Siegler =

French serial killer (born 1967)

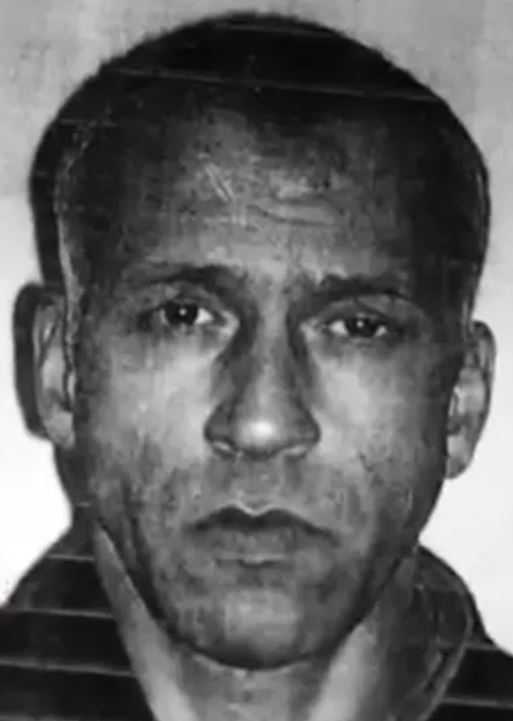
- Siegler mugshot from the 2000s
- Born: Franck Siegler; 19 September 1967 (age 59); Belfort, France
- Status: Incarcerated
- Penalty: 10 years' imprisonment (first murder); Life imprisonment x2 (later murders)

Details
- Victims: 3
- Span of crimes: 12 February 1986 – 9 January 2017
- Country: France
- Date apprehended: February 1986 (first time); During 1994 (second time); During 1995 (third time); November 1998 (fourth time); 5 April 2007 (final time)

Franck Siegler (born 19 September 1967) is a French serial killer and multi-recidivist killer.

A three-time murderer, Siegler committed his crimes between 1986 and 2017, appearing before the Assize Court on five occasions (1987, 2009, 2010, 2019 and 2021), resulting in three separate convictions (two for first degree murder and one for second-degree murder).

A criminal from 1980 onwards, he committed his first murder on 12 February 1986, when he was 18 years old. He was imprisoned and sentenced in 1987 to 10 years’ imprisonment. It was during this period of detention that he met Robert Moris, with whom he would kill again years later.

Released in 1993, Siegler was re-imprisoned in 1994 following a robbery and sentenced to one year in prison. In 1995, whilst on day release, he escaped for a few days. Imprisoned for these offences, he attempted to escape again and had his sentence extended by three years. Released in 1998, Siegler assaulted a taxi driver and stole his documents. Imprisoned for robbery with violence, he was sentenced again in 2000 to 10 years in prison.

While on day release on 13 March 2007, he failed to return to Meaux Prison and re-established contact with Moris, with whom he murdered Philippe Vuillet on 20 March. Siegler was arrested on 5 April 2007 during a police stop in Paris. Moris was arrested two days later. They were imprisoned whilst blaming each other. Tried in December 2009, Siegler and Moris were sentenced to 30 years’ imprisonment (with a minimum term of 20 years for Siegler). On appeal, on 1 July 2010, Moris’s sentence was upheld, whilst Siegler was sentenced to life imprisonment.

After being transferred to Vendin-le-Vieil prison, Siegler killed a fellow inmate on 9 January 2017, together with Jonathan Fragnière, a cellmate. In December 2019, Fragnière was sentenced to 30 years’ imprisonment, whilst Siegler was sentenced to life imprisonment with a minimum term of 22 years. On appeal, on 2 April 2021, these sentences were upheld.

== Biography ==
=== Early life and delinquency ===
Franck Siegler was born on 19 September 1967 in Belfort (Territoire de Belfort).

He was the fourth of seven siblings and the only boy. His father was a lorry driver, often away on business, but reputed to be an alcoholic and violent, tying Siegler to a dog lead when he got into trouble. His mother does not work and has no relationship with him. During his childhood, he told his mother that he had been sexually abused by his maternal uncle, but she refused to believe that her brother could have carried out such acts.

In September 1980, when he entered the fifth form, Siegler began to commit theft and various petty crimes. He was 13 at the time. In 1981, when he was 14, Siegler dropped out of school but, unable to find any stability, his mother placed him in a home. He stayed in and out of care until 1984, running away from home, stealing and committing petty crimes, living like a semi-vagabond.

In 1986, Siegler was taken in by a woman who agreed to put him up.

=== First murder and detention ===
On the night of 11 to 12 February 1986, Siegler spent the evening at his landlady's home with a 24-year-old man. Siegler quickly became violent when the young man made homosexual advances towards him. Enraged by these advances, Siegler violently hits the young man with a baton and strangles him to death with a scarf. Not knowing what to do with his victim's body, he decides to take it up to the attic and hang it from a beam. When Siegler's landlady discovered the body in the attic, she called in the police. The autopsy concluded that the victim had been murdered, due to the numerous wounds he had sustained.

In mid-February 1986, Siegler, aged 18, was taken into police custody in connection with the case. He quickly admitted that he had killed his victim in response to the sexual advances he had made to her. He then claimed to have lost all control, modelling his defence on the classic model used by many homophobic killers. Siegler was charged with murder and remanded in pre-trial detention at the Besançon prison. The investigation partly confirmed Siegler's version of events, as the victim was openly homosexual. While in custody, Siegler was examined by experts, who concluded that his intolerance of frustration explained his use of violence, but found him responsible for his actions, in particular for having tried to conceal the existence of his crime and disguised it as suicide.

Siegler appeared before the Besançon Assize Court in 1987. He was 20 years old at the time. At his trial, Siegler repeated his confession, stating that he had killed his victim because of the sexual advances he had made to her, thus explaining his loss of control. At the end of his trial, Siegler was sentenced to 10 years' imprisonment. From 4 to 5 December, there was a mutiny at the Besançon prison, in which Siegler took part in damaging the electrical installations and the prison washbasins. Following the mutiny, at 3am, 18 prisoners were charged with unlawful confinement, seven of them, and damage to the others, including Siegler.

On 2 June 1988, Siegler, aged 20, Patrick Turillon, aged 26, Serge Caujolle-Bert, aged 26, Lezhar Hakkar, aged 24, Mustafa Naamoune, aged 27, Stéphane Métayer, aged 22, and Abdelkader Adjadj, aged 24, appeared before the Besançon criminal court charged with damaging property. They were sentenced to a further four months in prison.

In the early 1990s, Siegler was transferred to the Ensisheim prison, where he met Robert Moris, an inmate almost 13 years his senior. Moris had been in prison since 1984 and was serving an 18-year sentence for murder. The two inmates became fast friends, in particular because of their hatred of homosexuality, which had led them to kill.

=== Release and re-incarcerations ===
Siegler was released in 1993 after 7 years in prison. Following his release from prison, Siegler met his future partner and became the father of a daughter. He briefly kept in touch with Moris, but lost touch with him when Moris was released from prison in 1995.

In 1994, Siegler was arrested again for theft and remanded in pre-trial detention. In 1995, the criminal court sentenced him to one year's imprisonment. After a few months in prison, he was granted leave, but did not return to the prison. After a few days, Siegler was finally spotted and arrested. He was charged with escape and then remanded in pre-trial detention. Incarcerated at the Reims prison, Siegler attempted to escape on the night of 22 to 23 June 1995, in the company of two other prisoners, Djamel Hamloud and Thierry Vérin. They were eventually spotted and overpowered by prison guards. All three were charged with attempted escape. They appeared before the Reims Criminal Court in May 1996. Siegler was sentenced to a further year's imprisonment, while Halmoud and Vérin received three and four months' imprisonment respectively. That same year, Siegler appeared in court for his escape and was sentenced to three years' imprisonment.

Siegler was released in 1998, after serving his sentence, and returned to live with his partner and daughter. His ambition was to travel to Spain but, due to their low income, the couple had to give up.

=== Robbery and imprisonment ===
On 21 September 1998, Siegler broke into the home of a friend's father, a taxi driver, gassed him with tear gas and then robbed him, stealing his papers and his car. The taxi driver lodged a complaint against Siegler, who fled the scene. After two months on the run, Siegler was arrested at a roadside checkpoint in November 1998 as he was trying to make his way to Spain. While in police custody, he admitted to the crime, justifying his actions by his impecuniosity and his desire to travel to Spain. He was charged with robbery with violence, violence, home invasion and damage, and remanded in pre-trial detention. In 2000, Siegler appeared before the criminal court for robbery with violence, home invasion and damage, committed as a repeat offender. He was again sentenced to 10 years' imprisonment.

Siegler attempted to escape twice, in 2000 and 2001, but failed each time and was sentenced to several more months. He then went on hunger strike, without further success. After these failed attempts, he calmed down and completed his sentence. In November 2006, he was transferred to the Meaux-Chauconin-Neufmontiers prison, where his exemplary behaviour surprised many.

=== Escape, second murder and a life on the run ===
Siegler was released from prison on 13 March 2007 on one day's leave to see his partner and daughter. He was due to return to Meaux Prison that same evening, but failed to do so. He returned to Paris, before leaving for Belfort by train. He was fined for not having a ticket the next day. Siegler's escape was not immediately revealed, but due to his dangerous nature, a wanted persons notice was published on 16 March. On 17 March, Siegler contacted Moris again, calling from a Mulhouse phone box. Claiming to have been robbed of his papers, Siegler said he needed accommodation for the next three days in exchange for a job in Spain. Convinced of his long-time friend's good faith, Moris agreed to take him in. The two men met again the same day at Moris's home in Reguisheim.

On 19 March, Siegler met 33-year-old Philippe Vuillet over coffee at Moris's house. Seeing this as an opportunity to obtain identity papers to ensure his escape, Siegler planned to kill Vuillet. On the afternoon of 20 March, Siegler, Moris and Vuillet meet at Moris's home. While Moris went off to do some shopping, Siegler was left alone with Vuillet and took the opportunity to put some medication in Vuillet's glass. When Moris returns, Vuillet collapses. Siegler grabs a tear-gas canister, gasses Vuillet and ties him up with his belt. Moris was frightened and tried to restrain Siegler, who then pretended to give Vuillet a beating, claiming that Vuillet had confessed to him that he was a paedophile. The two men loaded Vuillet into his car, before stopping in a wood in Ensisheim. Siegler pulled Vuillet out of the car, beat him with a crank handle and then strangled him to death before tying him to a tree. Moris and Siegler then left the scene. Siegler and Moris headed for Belfort, but on 21 March Siegler abandoned his friend, leaving him alone. Moris called a friend, who drove him home that evening. Siegler continued on the run, but broke down on 23 March.

On 24 March, Siegler went to the home of Philippe's partner Sylvie and stole her car. Sylvie lodged a complaint against her partner, whose disappearance has not yet been taken seriously, for car theft. Siegler managed to find Sylvie's telephone number and called her from a payphone on 26 March, ordering her to stop looking for Vuillet.This call marked the start of a car theft investigation. During his escape, Siegler phoned his girlfriend. However, he was unaware that Vuillet was wanted. On 4 April, Siegler went to see the doctor he had been seeing at the Château-Thierry prison under Vuillet's name.

=== Arrest and imprisonment ===
Siegler was arrested on 5 April 2007 during a parking enforcement operation in the middle of Paris. Posing as Vuillet, Siegler was taken into custody and claimed to have left Sylvie because of a relationship and rumours of paedophilia against her. Suspected of car theft, his DNA was taken and sent to the Fichier national automatisé des empreintes génétiques. The results came back quickly: the DNA of the man in custody was that of Franck Siegler, aged 39, who was wanted following his escape. Questioned about his possession of Vuillet's papers, Siegler claimed that Moris had given them to him after killing Vuillet. At the end of his police custody, Siegler was charged with escape, identity theft and car theft and remanded in pre-trial detention at the Fresnes prison. He was not prosecuted for murder, as there was insufficient evidence.

Moris was arrested on 7 April at his home and subsequently taken into police custody. He initially denied having been in contact with Vuillet on the day of the incident and claimed to have stayed at home. The gendarmes then showed him his mobile phone tracking, proving his communications with the missing man as well as his movements. Faced with this evidence, Moris admitted his involvement in Vuillet’s murder, but claimed that Siegler was solely responsible. Speaking to the police, Moris revealed the location of Vuillet’s body, which was found, as he had indicated, in a wood in Ensisheim. He was charged with murder as a ‘repeat offender’ and remanded in pre-trial detention. A few days later, Siegler was charged with the same offences and transferred to Nancy-Maxéville Remand Centre.

The autopsy showed that Vuillet had been beaten before being strangled. DNA traces found at the crime scene belonged to Siegler and Vuillet, confirming Moris's version that only Siegler had killed Vuillet. In addition, the staging of the victim's body bore similarities to Siegler's first murder, in 1986, suggesting the signature of a serial killer after each murder. The motive for the crime, on the other hand, boils down to Siegler's need to obtain identity papers for his escape. The fact that he contacted Moris seems to be linked to Siegler's intention to absolve himself of responsibility by putting his accomplice in charge. Both blame each other.

The psychiatric examination revealed no mental pathology in either of the defendants. Siegler was described as a violent, manipulative personality, highly intolerant of certain comments and capable of killing to ‘take justice into his own hands’. In solitary confinement, he was also described as a mythomaniac, having admitted to some twenty murders before recanting. Moris, for his part, was described as a personality intolerant of homosexuality, with a tendency to minimise his responsibility.

=== Judgement in the murder of Vuillet and detention ===
On 7 December 2009, Siegler and Moris went on trial before the Colmar Assize Court (Haut-Rhin) for the murder of Vuillet. On their arrival in the dock, Siegler presented himself well, while Moris appeared ruder and clumsier.

At the trial, the two defendants continued to blame each other, leaving some doubt as to who had inflicted the fatal blows. Siegler admitted helping Moris to strangle Vuillet, but denied having cranked the handle. For his part, Moris said he had not ‘touched a hair’ of Vuillet's head. Siegler was described in court as a manipulator who had taken refuge in crime and was at high risk of re-offending. Moris, on the other hand, was not considered to present the same risk, having committed no crime between his release in 1995 and the murder of Vuillet in 2007, despite his multiple convictions between 1975 and 1987.

On 9 December, Siegler was sentenced to 30 years' imprisonment, with a 20-year security period. Moris was also sentenced to 30 years' imprisonment, but without a security period. The convicted men appealed against the sentence.

On 16 June 2010, Siegler appeared before the Meaux Criminal Court for his escape from the Meaux-Chauconin-Neufmontiers prison. He was sentenced to one year's imprisonment. On 28 June, Siegler and Moris went on trial on appeal before the Strasbourg Assize Court (Bas-Rhin). At this trial, Moris' personality was better established than at first instance, with him being described as helpful, honest, courageous and intolerant of inaction. In court, Moris's wife explained that he had told her that Vuillet came to his house too often. She was also convinced that Siegler had influenced Moris in Vuillet's murder. Siegler, for his part, stuck to his guns, as he had in the first trial, accusing Moris of having cranked the handle and claiming that he had only helped to strangle Vuillet. The trial was also marked by the pressure felt by both defendants, with Moris losing patience and trying to twist the microphone. On 1 July, Siegler was sentenced to life imprisonment, with a minimum term of 20 years. Moris was again sentenced 30 years' imprisonment.

Siegler was incarcerated at the Ensisheim Central Prison, before being transferred to the Clairvaux Central Prison. From February 2015, he requested a transfer to another prison to be closer to his partner and daughter, but his requests went unanswered. In 2016, Siegler was caught by a prison guard in possession of computer equipment. Furious with him, Siegler threatened to kill him. He was charged with these offences. In September 2016, Siegler was transferred to the Vendin-le-Vieil prison. He strongly contested this decision and threatened to kill a fellow inmate if he was not transferred elsewhere.

=== Third murder in custody and other problems ===
On 9 January 2017, Siegler, aged 49, went to the telephone point at Vendin-le-Vieil Prison, with a shoelace in his hand, to telephone relatives, according to him. At the same time, Jonathan Fragnière, a 28-year-old inmate imprisoned since July 2012 for aggravated attempted murder, went to the cell of Geoffrey Debouver, another 27-year-old inmate, leaving the cell door open. Taking advantage of this access, Siegler entered the cell, threw himself on Debouver, smashed his skull and strangled him to death using his shoelace. The prison guards immediately alerted the emergency services, but they were unable to resuscitate the victim. The autopsy concluded that there had been a rapid outburst of violence.

Siegler and Fragnière were taken into custody in connection with this case. Only Siegler admitted having struck Devouber. Fragnière denied any involvement in the crime. At the end of their period in police custody, Siegler and Fragnière were charged with murder in a state of ‘legal recidivism’. The two prisoners were transferred to another prison. The investigation into the crime concluded that they had been murdered, with evidence that the crime had been prepared. The fact that Siegler was holding a shoelace in his hand when he said he wanted to make a phone call lends credence to the theory of premeditation. In addition, he had repeatedly announced that he would kill someone in order to be transferred to another prison. As for Fragnière, he did not carry out the fatal blows but, because he passively witnessed the crime, he is being prosecuted as an accessory to murder.

Transferred to the Condé-sur-Sarthe prison, Siegler threatened to kill a guard in 2018 and ransacked his detention area. Judge Éric Martin charged him with making death threats and damaging property. In June 2019, Siegler called a guard on his cell intercom, telling him that he would have killed the guards if he had had the chance, during a previous hostage-taking incident on 5 March. He was again charged with making death threats. On 4 September, Siegler set fire to his cell. Once the fire had been brought under control, he insulted the prison guards and threatened to kill them. He was charged with criminal damage and sentenced to a further two years’ imprisonment on 10 September.

On 10 October, he appeared again before the Alençon Criminal Court for damage and death threats committed in 2016, 2018 and 2019. He remained in the box for only a short time, before being expelled for refusing to answer Judge Martin's questions. Siegler was sentenced to a further 16 months in prison for these offences. As a result of this judgement, Siegler's cell was compared to a cell in Beirut.

=== Judgement in the murder of Debouver ===
On 4 December 2019, Siegler and Fragnière went on trial before the Saint-Omer (Pas-de-Calais) Assize Court for the murder of Debouver. They were 52 and 31 years old at the time. At the trial, only Fragnière was present, as Siegler refused to appear. Siegler's statements before the crime, concerning his intention to have Debouver transferred, were mentioned in court. For his part, Fragnière denied any murderous intent towards Debouver. The civil parties' lawyer, Carine Delaby-Faure, deplored the fact that the prison administration was ‘partly responsible for the tragedy’, citing ‘serious failings.

On 11 December, Siegler was sentenced to life imprisonment, with a minimum term of 22 years, for murder in ‘legal recidivism’. Fragnière was sentenced to 30 years’ imprisonment for aiding and abetting murder as a ‘legal recidivism’. Only Siegler is appealing against this decision. As the offence involved aiding and abetting rather than joint criminal conduct, the Crown Prosecution Service is not appealing against Fragnière’s conviction.

On 30 March 2021, Siegler’s appeal hearing begins to the Douai Assize Court (Nord). Unlike at the trial in the court of first instance, Siegler is present in the dock. When he takes the floor, the defendant apologises to Devouber’s family, explaining that he should never have killed his fellow prisoner. Siegler shifts the blame onto the prison authorities, who turned a deaf ear to his repeated threats to carry out the act. He even looks away when shown photographs of the crime scene. Questioned via videoconference, Fragnière – who had always denied any involvement in the murder – finally admits his part in the crime whilst being heard as a witness. This statement angers Siegler, who insists that the crime was indeed organised by the two of them. On 2 April, Siegler was again sentenced to life imprisonment, with a minimum term of 22 years.

=== Case of searches at Condé-sur-Sarthe prison ===
In December 2020, Siegler also lodged a complaint against the prison administration for fourteen searches carried out in his cell, which he considered illegal. The searches were carried out between April 2018 and July 2020 at the Condé-sur-Sarthe prison.

On 9 December 2022, the Caen Administrative Court ruled that five of the searches had not been carried out legally and ordered the State to pay Siegler €500. The State was not ordered to carry out the other nine searches, which were motivated by damage to a glass-ceramic plate, suspicion of possession of a homemade weapon, prevention of the risk of suicide, the deposit of broken glass and a sharpened metal handle, and threats to set fire to his cell. On 30 May 2024, the Conseil d'État overturned the decision, rejecting Siegler's claim for compensation.

== Allegations of serial murder ==
In March 2008, while in pre-trial detention for the murder of Philippe Vuillet, Siegler sent a letter to the examining magistrate, saying that he wanted to talk to him about the Vuillet murder and then digressing to claim that he had committed more than twenty murders. He retracted his confession in a subsequent letter. These unsubstantiated confessions are reminiscent of the false confessions made by Henry Lee Lucas in the 1980s, which were intended to make him look like the worst serial killer in his country.

Siegler can also be compared to Lucas for his ability to kill on a simple sadistic impulse, in addition to his desire to be perceived as an exceptional criminal. Like Lucas, he has sometimes been described as a ‘serial liar.
