= Online chat =

Real-time communication over the internet

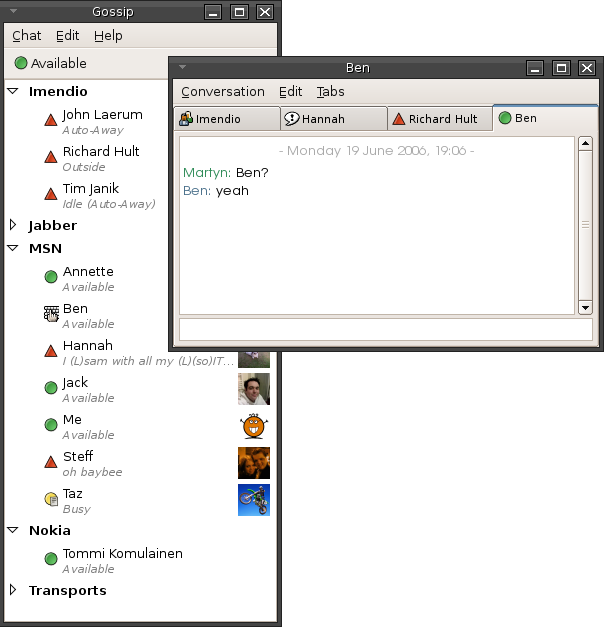
In this typical online chat program, the window to the left shows a list of contacts, and the window to the right shows a conversation between the user and one of those contacts.

Online chat is any direct text-, audio- or video-based (webcams), one-on-one or one-to-many (group) chat (formally also known as synchronous conferencing), using tools such as instant messengers, Internet Relay Chat (IRC), talkers and possibly MUDs or other online games. Online chat includes web-based applications that allow communication – often directly addressed, but anonymous between users in a multi-user environment. Web conferencing is a more specific online service that is often sold as a service, hosted on a web server controlled by the vendor. Online chat may address point-to-point communications as well as multicast communications from one sender to multiple receivers and voice and video chat, or may be a feature of a web conferencing service.

Online chat in a narrower sense is any kind of communication over the Internet that offers a real-time transmission of text messages from sender to receiver. Chat messages are generally short to enable other participants to respond quickly. Thereby, a feeling similar to a spoken conversation is created, which distinguishes chatting from other text-based online communication forms such as Internet forums and email. The expression online chat comes from the word chat which means "informal conversation".

Synchronous conferencing or synchronous computer-mediated communication (SCMC) is any form of computer-mediated communication that occurs in real-time; that is, there is no significant delay between sending and receiving messages. SCMC includes real-time forms of text, audio, and video communication. SCMC has been highly studied in the context of e-learning.

== History ==
The first chat system was used by the U.S. government in 1971. It was developed by Murray Turoff, a young PhD graduate from Berkeley, and its first use was during President Nixon's wage-price freeze under Project Delphi. The system was called EMISARI and would allow 10 regional offices to link together in a real-time online chat known as the party line. It was in use up until 1986.

The first public online chat system was called Talkomatic, created by Doug Brown and David R. Woolley in 1973 on the PLATO System at the University of Illinois. It offered several channels, each of which could accommodate up to five people, with messages appearing on all users' screens character-by-character as they were typed. Talkomatic was popular among PLATO users into the mid-1980s. In 2014, Brown and Woolley released a web-based version of Talkomatic.

The first online system to use the actual command "chat" was created for The Source in 1979 by Tom Walker and Fritz Thane of Dialcom, Inc.

The first dedicated online chat service that was widely available to the public was the CompuServe CB Simulator in 1980, created by CompuServe executive Alexander "Sandy" Trevor in Columbus, Ohio. Chat rooms gained mainstream popularity with AOL.

Other chat platforms flourished during the 1980s. Among the earliest with a GUI was BroadCast, a Macintosh extension that became especially popular on university campuses in America and Germany.

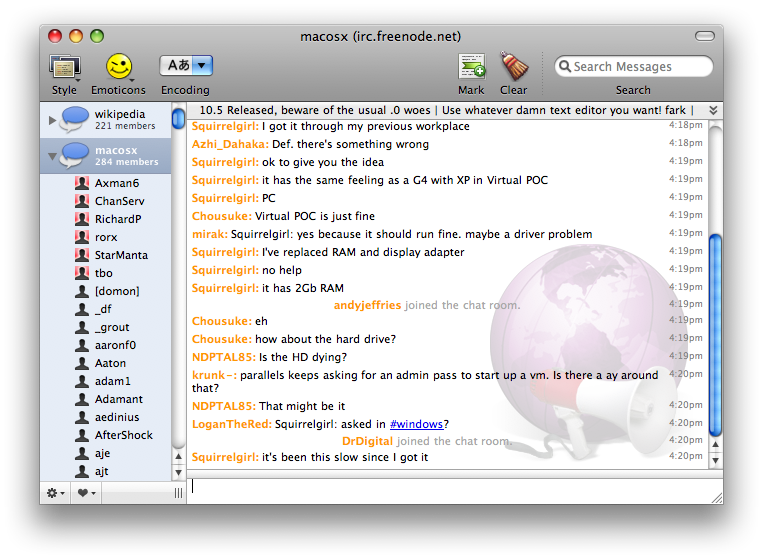
A conversation on IRC

Jarkko Oikarinen created Internet Relay Chat (IRC) in 1988. Many peer-to-peer clients have chat rooms, e.g., Ares Galaxy, eMule, Filetopia, Retroshare, Vuze, WASTE, WinMX, etc. Many popular social media platforms are now used as chat rooms, such as WhatsApp, Facebook, Twitter, Discord, Snapchat, Instagram, TikTok, and many more.

The first transatlantic Internet chat took place between Oulu, Finland and Corvallis, Oregon in February 1989.

The first dedicated online chat service that was widely available to the public was the CompuServe CB Simulator in 1980, created by CompuServe executive Alexander "Sandy" Trevor in Columbus, Ohio. Ancestors include network chat software such as UNIX "talk" used in the 1970s.

Chat is implemented in multiple video-conferencing tools. A study of chat use during work-related videoconferencing found that chat during meetings allows participants to communicate without interrupting the meeting, plan action around common resources, and enables greater inclusion. The study also found that chat can cause distractions and information asymmetries between participants.

== Types ==
According to the type of media used, synchronous conferencing can be divided into

- audio conferencing: only audio is used
- video conferencing: Both audio (voice) and video and pictures are used.

According to the number of access points used, synchronous conferencing can be divided into

- point-to-point: Only two computers are connected end to end.
- multi-point: Two or more computers are connected.

== Methods ==
Some of the methods used in synchronous conferencing are:

- Chat (text only): Multiple participants can be logged into the conference and can interactively share resources and ideas. There is also an option to save the chat and archive it for later review.
- Voice (telephone or voice-over IP): This is a conference call between the instructor and the participating students where they can speak through a built-in microphone or a headset.
- Video conferencing: This may or may not require the participants to have their webcams running. Usually, a video conference involves a live feed from a classroom or elsewhere or content.
- Web conferencing: This includes Webinar (Web-based seminar) as well. Unlike in video conferencing, participants of web conferencing can access a wider variety of media elements. Web conferences are comparatively more interactive and usually incorporate chat sessions as well.
- Virtual worlds: In this setup, students can meet in the virtual world and speak with each other through headsets and VoIP. This can make learning more productive and engaging when the students can navigate the worlds and operate in their avatar.

== Chat room ==
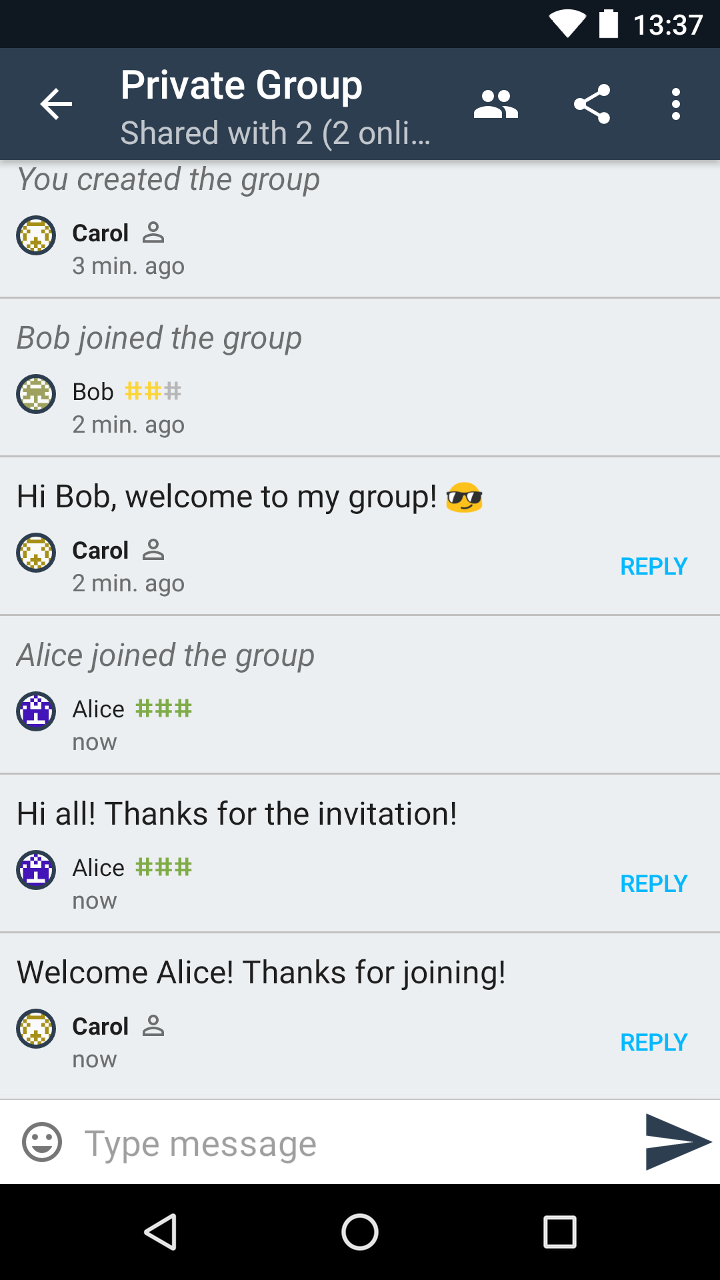
Screenshot of a group chat in the Briar communication client

The terms chat room, or chatroom (and sometimes group chat; abbreviated as GC), are primarily used to describe any form of synchronous conferencing, occasionally even asynchronous conferencing. The term can thus span technology ranging from real-time online chat and online interaction with strangers (e.g., online forums) to fully immersive graphical social environments. The primary use of a chat room is to share information via text with a group of other users.

Generally speaking, the ability to converse with multiple people in the same conversation differentiates chat rooms from instant messaging programs, which are more typically designed for one-to-one communication. The users in a particular chat room are generally connected via a shared internet or other similar connection, and chat rooms exist catering for a wide range of subjects. New technology has enabled the use of file sharing and webcams.

=== Graphical multi-user environments ===
Visual chat rooms add graphics to the chat experience, in either 2D or 3D (employing virtual reality technology). These are characterized by using a graphic representation of the user, an avatar virtual elements such as games (in particular massively multiplayer online games) and educational material most often developed by individual site owners, who in general are simply more advanced users of the systems. The most popular environments, such as The Palace, also allow users to create/build their own spaces. Some of the most popular 3D chat experiences are IMVU and Second Life (though they extend far beyond just chat). Many such implementations generate profit by selling virtual goods to users at a high margin.

Some online chat rooms also incorporate audio and video communications, so that users may actually see and hear each other.

Games are also often played in chat rooms. These are typically implemented by an external process such as an IRC bot joining the room to conduct the game. Trivia question and answer games are most prevalent. A historic example is Hunt the Wumpus. Chatroom-based implementations of the party game Mafia also exist. A similar, but more complex style of text-based gaming are MUDs, in which players interact within a textual, interactive fiction–like environment.

== Conferencing ==
Both synchronous and asynchronous conferencing are online conferencing where the participants can interact while being physically located at different places in the world. Asynchronous conferencing allows the students to access the learning material at their convenience while synchronous conferencing requires that all participants including the instructor and the students be online at the time of the conference.

While synchronous conferencing enables real-time interaction of the participants, asynchronous conferencing allows participants to post messages and others can respond to them at any convenient time. Sometimes a combination of both synchronous and asynchronous conferencing is used. Both methods give a permanent record of the conference.

== In education ==
Synchronous conferencing in education helps in the delivery of content through digital media. Since this is real-time teaching, it also brings the benefits of face-to-face teaching in distance learning. Multiple higher education institutions offer well-designed quality e-learning opportunities. Some of the advantages of synchronous conferencing in education are:

- Helps the students to connect with not only their teachers and peers but also with recognized experts in the field regardless of the geographical distance and different time zones.
- Provides opportunities for both the teachers and the students to expand their knowledge outside the classroom.
- Helps students who are home-bound or have limited mobility to connect with their classrooms and participate in learning.
- Helps the faculty to conduct classes when they are not able to come to classes due to an emergency.
- Supports real-time collaboration, interaction, and immediate feedback
- Encourages students to learn together and in turn, develop cultural understanding
- Personalized learning experience for the students
- Real-time discussion opportunities for students promoting student engagement
- Active interaction can lead to an associated community of like-minded students
- Saves travel expenses and time

=== Implementation ===
There are four critical factors identified for implementing synchronous conferencing for effective instruction to the students

- Video and audio quality which depends on technical factors like higher bandwidth and processing capabilities of the system.
- Training time depends on the familiarity and proficiency of the instructors and the students with the technology.
- Teaching strategies depend on the adaptability of the instructors to the new methods, preparing appropriate and effective training materials, and motivating students.
- Direct meeting of the instructor and the students.

The tools for implementing synchronous conferencing depend on the type of educational problem addressed. This is in turn decides the method of synchronous conferencing to be used and the tool to be used in the learning context. The tool selected addresses the problem of improving the learning outcomes which cannot be solved with an asynchronous environment. There are a number of tools and platforms available for synchronous conferencing.

- Smartphone applications
- Web conferencing tools
- Video conferencing tools
- Video and hangout platforms
- Shared whiteboards

The selection of tools and platforms also depends on the group size which depends on the activity for the course design.

=== Limitations ===
Some limitations for synchronous conferencing in learning are:

- Disjointed discussions, not connected in time
- Lack of effective moderation and/or clear guidelines for learners
- Difficulty in collaborating on online projects
- Lack of proper communication with the instructor and students.
- Technical issues may arise if not analysed and planned in advance
- Lack of familiarity with the tools
- Limited time to complete the learning activity and to incorporate interactions with the learners

== Chatiquette ==
The term chatiquette (chat etiquette) is a variation of netiquette (Internet etiquette) and describes basic rules of online communication. These conventions or guidelines have been created to avoid misunderstandings and to simplify the communication between users. Chatiquette varies from community to community and generally describes basic courtesy. As an example, it is considered rude to write only in upper case, because it appears as if the user is shouting. The word "chatiquette" has been used in connection with various chat systems (e.g. Internet Relay Chat) since 1995.

Chatrooms can produce a strong sense of online identity leading to impression of subculture.

Chats are valuable sources of various types of information, the automatic processing of which is the object of chat/text mining technologies.

== Social criticism ==
Criticism of online chatting and text messaging include concern that they replace proper English with shorthand or with an almost completely new hybrid language.

Writing is changing as it takes on some of the functions and features of speech. Internet chat rooms and rapid real-time teleconferencing allow users to interact with whoever happens to coexist in cyberspace. These virtual interactions involve us in 'talking' more freely and more widely than ever before. With chatrooms replacing multiple face-to-face conversations, it is necessary to be able to have quick conversation as if the person were present, so some learn to type as quickly as they would normally speak. Some critics are wary that this casual form of speech is being used so much that it will slowly take over common grammar; however, such a change has yet to be seen.

With the increasing population of online chatrooms there has been a massive growth of new words created or slang words, a number of them documented on the website Urban Dictionary. Sven Birkerts wrote:

"as new electronic modes of communication provoke similar anxieties amongst critics who express concern that young people are at risk, endangered by a rising tide of information over which the traditional controls of print media and the guardians of knowledge have no control on it".

In Guy Merchant's journal article Teenagers in Cyberspace: An Investigation of Language Use and Language Change in Internet Chatrooms; Merchant says

"that teenagers and young people are in the leading the movement of change as they take advantage of the possibilities of digital technology, drastically changing the face of literacy in a variety of media through their uses of mobile phone text messages, e-mails, web-pages and on-line chatrooms. This new literacy develops skills that may well be important to the labor market but are currently viewed with suspicion in the media and by educationalists.

Merchant also says "Younger people tend to be more adaptable than other sectors of society and, in general, quicker to adapt to new technology. To some extent they are the innovators, the forces of change in the new communication landscape." In this article he is saying that young people are merely adapting to what they were given.

== Protocols ==
The following are common chat programs and protocols:

- AIM (No longer available)
- Camfrog
- Campfire
- Discord
- XMPP (Extensible Messaging and Presence Protocol)
- Flock
- Gadu-Gadu
- Google Talk (No longer available)
- I2P-Messenger (anonymous, end-to-end encrypted IM for the I2P network)
- ICQ (OSCAR)
- ICB
- IRC
- Line
- Mattermost
- Apple Messages
- Teams
- Paltalk
- PSYC (Protocol for Synchronous Conferencing)
- RetroShare (encrypted, decentralized)
- Signal (encrypted messaging protocol and software)
- SILC (Secure Internet Live Conferencing protocol)
- SIMPLE (instant messaging protocol) (Session Initiation Protocol for Instant Messaging and Presence Leveraging Extensions)
- Skype
- Slack
- Talk
- Talker
- TeamSpeak (TS)
- Telegram
- QQ
- The Palace (encrypted, decentralized)
- WebChat Broadcasting System (WBS)
- WeChat
- WhatsApp
- Windows Live Messenger
- Yahoo! Messenger (No longer available)

Chat programs supporting multiple protocols:

- Adium
- Google+ Hangouts
- IBM Sametime
- Kopete
- Miranda NG
- Pidgin
- Quiet Internet Pager
- Trillian
- Windows Live Messenger

Websites with browser-based chat services:

- Chat-Avenue
- Convore (No longer available)
- Cryptocat
- eBuddy
- Facebook
- FilmOn
- Gmail
- Google+ (No longer available)
- Chat Television (No longer available)
- MeBeam
- Meebo (No longer available)
- Mibbit (No longer available)
- Omegle (no longer available)
- Talkomatic
- Tinychat
- Tokbox (No longer available)
- Trillian
- Userplane (No longer available)
- Woo Media (No longer available)
- Zumbl (No longer available)

== See also ==
- Asynchronous conferencing
- Chat line
- Collaborative software
- Email
- Instant messaging
- Internet forum
- Internet Relay Chat
- List of chat websites
- MUDs (Multi-User Dungeons)
- Comparison of instant messaging protocols
- Online dating service
- Real-time text
- Videotelephony
- Voice chat
