= The Startup Kids =

- Theatrical release poster
- Directed by: Vala Halldorsdottir, Sesselja Vilhjalmsdottir
- Starring: Tim Draper; MG Siegler
- Release date: September 2, 2012
- Running time: 55 minutes
- Country: Iceland
- Language: English
- Budget: $23,000

The Startup Kids is a documentary about young technology entrepreneurs in the U.S. and Europe. The hour-long movie was created by two Icelandic women, Vala Halldorsdottir and Sesselja Vilhjalmsdottir, and was released in 2012. It contains interviews with startup founders who relay stories about the founding of their respective companies and their lives as entrepreneurs. The film also features interviews of notable startup founders and investors from the US and Europe about the startup environment, including the venture capitalist Tim Draper and MG Siegler, tech blogger at Techcrunch.

Notable interviewees featured in the documentary include:

- Leah Culver
- Zach Klein
- Jessica Mah
- Ben Way
- Brian Wong

== Production and funding ==
The two filmmakers cited that they were inspired to create the documentary following their own successes in business so that the film could provide motivation to up-and-coming startup founders.

To finance its production, the filmmakers raised US$23,000 in 2011 on the crowdfunding platform Kickstarter, surpassing the established $7,000 fundraising goal.
