= Zio Ziegler =

American visual artist (born 1988)

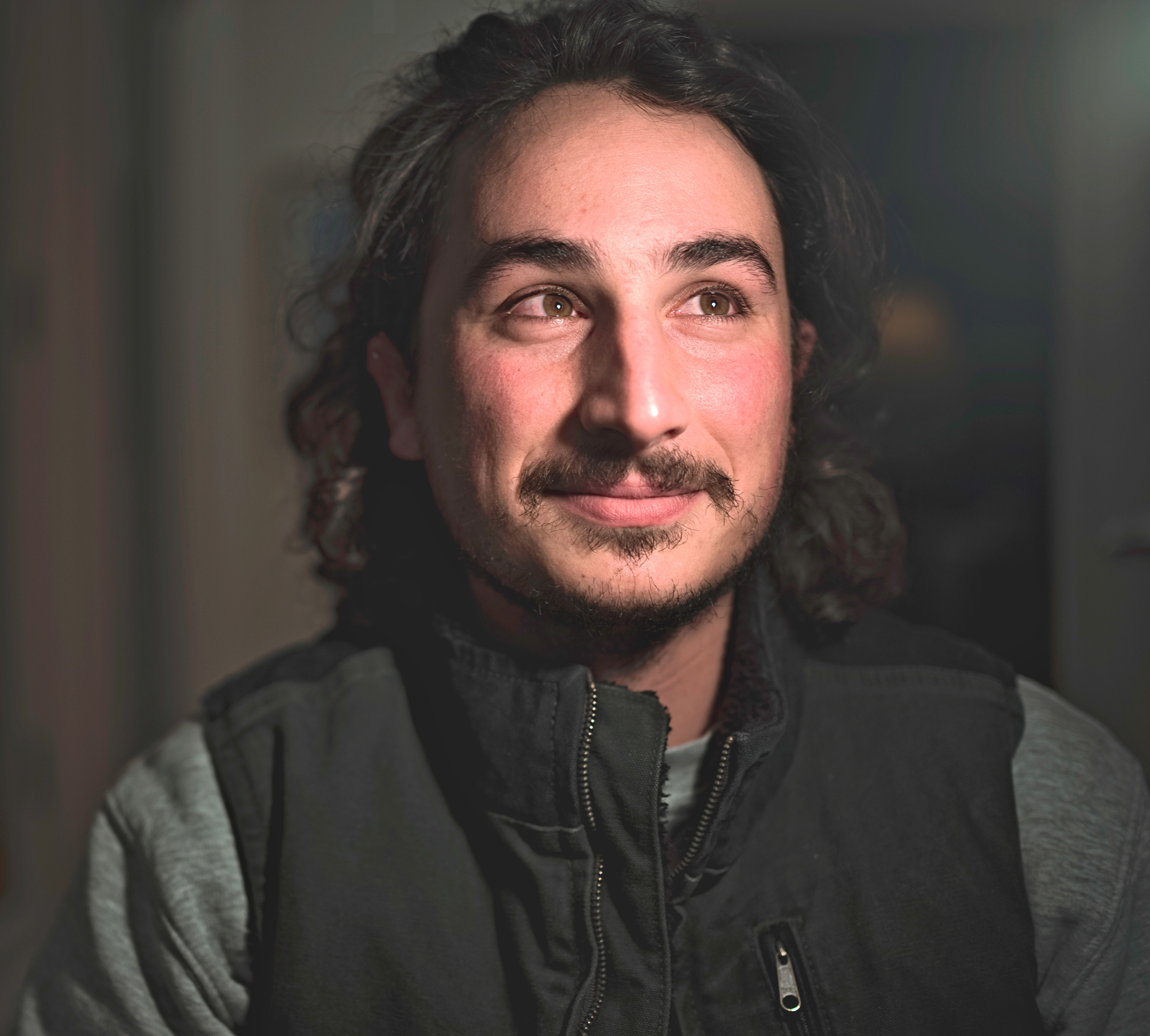
- Born: February 18, 1988 (age 38); United States
- Education: Brown University, Rhode Island School of Design (BFA)
- Occupations: Visual artist, graphic artist
- Known for: Murals, paintings

Zio Ziegler (born 1988) is an American visual artist. He is known best for his paintings and murals, many of which appear in the Mission District of San Francisco, as well as around the world such as Tokyo, Los Angeles, London and Italy.

== Early life and education ==
Ziegler's parents are Mel and Patricia Ziegler, the founders of Banana Republic. Ziegler studied art at Brown University, and the Rhode Island School of Design, and graduated with a BFA degree in painting from the latter in 2010.

== Career ==
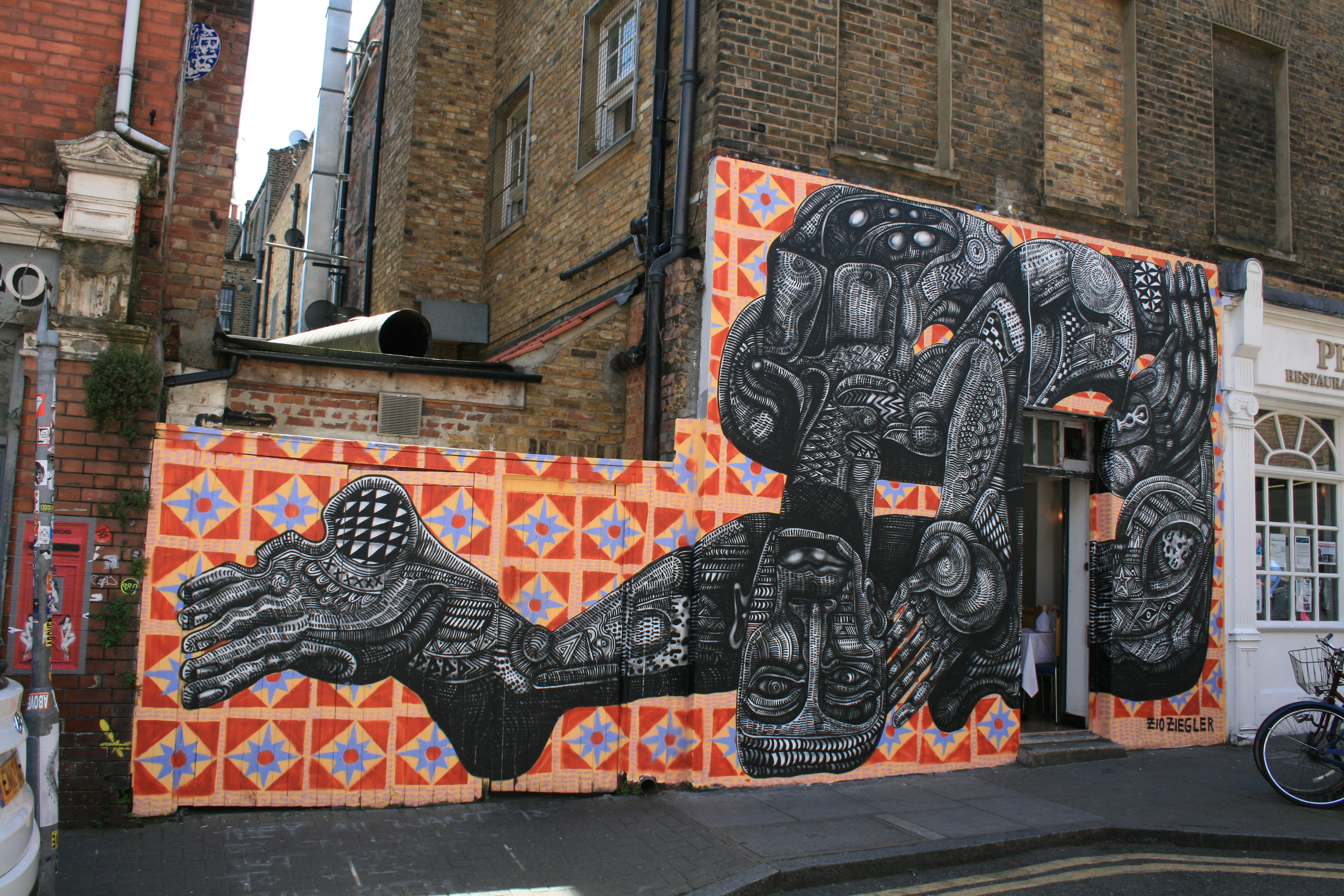
Mural by Zio Ziegler in London

Ziegler is known for both painting and murals, mentioning that his works are primarily inspired by literature, French modernism, and architecture.

Ziegler's murals can be seen on buildings worldwide such as Tokyo, Los Angeles, London, Italy, and more. Notable murals by Ziegler include a 135 feet (41 m) tall mural on the Cathedral Building in Oakland, California, commissioned by the United Nations Foundation to celebrate the 70th anniversary of the signing of the United Nations Charter.

Ziegler's work is held in institutions including the Rubell Museum, Longlati Foundation, Collecion Solo, Georgia Museum of Art, and the Phoenix Art Museum.

Ziegler is an adjunct professor in the Stanford d.school.

== Solo exhibitions ==
- 2024, Reverse Paintings, Almine Rech, Brussels
- 2023, The Essential Figures, Almine Rech, New York, NY
- 2022, ADAA, Almine Rech, New York, NY
- 2019, Meta-Myths, Allouche Benias Gallery, Athens, Greece
- 2018, The Fourth Wall, Marin Museum of Contemporary Art, Marin, CA
- 2017, Meta Species, Ochi Gallery, Sun Valley, ID
- 2016, Bernard Gwilliam & the Quantum Modernism, Jules Maeght, San Francisco
- 2016, To Arrive at the Truth, Ochi Gallery, Sun Valley, ID
- 2015, The Psyche's Gestures, Soze Gallery, Hollywood
- 2015, Painting is the Pattern, Jules Maeght, San Francisco

== Group exhibitions ==
- 2023, The Echo of Picasso, Museo Picasso Malaga, Malaga, Spain
- 2023, Color Code, McEvoy Foundation for the Arts, San Francisco, CA
