= Andréa McBride =

American entrepreneur

Andréa McBride John
- Born: 1982 or 1983 (age 42–43); Los Angeles, United States
- Citizenship: New Zealand; United States of America
- Education: University of Southern California
- Known for: McBride Sisters Wine Company
- Spouse: Fabian John (m. 2017)

Andréa McBride John (born 1982/1983) is a New Zealand-American entrepreneur. She is the co-founder and CEO of McBride Sisters Wine Company.

== Early life and education ==
Andréa McBride was born in Los Angeles to an African-American father from Camden, Alabama and a Scottish-New Zealand mother from Napier, Hawke's Bay. When she was 6 years old, she and her mother moved to the town of Blenheim, where her maternal grandparents and uncle lived. Her mother died soon after their arrival.

She was then primarily raised by her foster mother Diana Peri, and additionally her maternal uncle who was a wine grape farmer.

When she was 12 years old, she got a call from her father, Kelly McBride, who first told her about her half-sister, Robin, and that the McBride family was trying to find and locate her. Andréa would eventually meet Robin, who was raised by her mother in Monterey, California, for the first time, 5 years later at the LaGuardia Airport. Her father died before they could meet.

After completing high school at Avondale College in Aotearoa New Zealand, McBride received a fully-funded athletic scholarship for Track & Field as a Javelin thrower and Volleyball player at the University of Southern California. She graduated with a bachelor's degree in international relations with concentration in global business in 2007.

== Career ==
McBride along with her sister Robin, are wine industry entrepreneurs and have ventured into multiple businesses. In 2005, they founded their first business and became a licensed U.S. Federal Wine importing company. When they first started their company, they only imported a small number of Aotearoa New Zealand wines, and eventually became a licensed California wine distributor serving independent wine retailers and fine-dining restaurants.

In 2009, they founded eco.love Wines from Aotearoa New Zealand making their first wine vintage together. The brand focused on oceanic, coastal, sustainable and carbon zero wines from vineyards in Marlborough. They produced Sauvignon Blanc, Riesling & Pinot Noir.

In 2013, they established McBride Sisters Truvée, making oceanic, coastal, sustainable wines from the San Luis Obispo, California that was formed in partnership with Diageo Chateau & Estate Wines. The partnership ended with Diageo Chateau & Estates in 2016.

Andréa is also a member of the Wine Institute and the Women of the Vine & Spirits organization, which promotes the advancement of women in the industry.

=== McBride Sisters Wine Company ===
In 2017, the McBride sisters combined their businesses as the McBride Sisters Wine Company. They produce wine across two hemispheres, from premier oceanic, coastal winemaking regions which are at the root of the McBride Sisters story – where Andréa and Robin each grew up – in Aotearoa New Zealand and the Central Coast of California, in the United States. They offer a portfolio of brands; McBride Sisters Collection, Black Girl Magic Wines, and SHE CAN Wines and spritzers. They specialize in sparkling wines, aromatic white wines, light-body red wines, medium body red wines and wine spritzers. The McBride Sisters Wine Company produces, imports and markets its own wines. It specializes in serving Fortune 500 grocery stores and mass retailers, as well as wine and spirits chains, hotels, restaurants, independent wine shops, sports arenas and airlines across all 50 states of the U.S., Caribbean and Canada.

== Personal life ==
In 2017, McBride married her husband Fabian John. In 2019, McBride gave birth to her daughter, Meursault McBride John.

== Philanthropy ==
Andréa along with her sister Robin have participated in campaigns to promote diversity and inclusion in the wine industry. They co-founded the McBride Sisters SHE CAN Fund to address the lack of diversity in the wine industry and support the professional development and advancement of all women in winemaking, hospitality, entrepreneurship and ownership positions. The fund was launched in tandem with the McBride Sisters She Can Wine brand that contributes a portion of its sales to the fund.

In 2022 The McBride Sisters co-hosted with New York chef JJ Johnson during the Aspen food and Wine Festival the "Black on Black Dinner". The event was also hosted by Carmelo Anthony and Dwyane Wade, along with DLynne Proctor. Ticket sales from the dinner provided scholarships to the Wine Unify organization.

== Awards and recognition ==
In 2016, Pratt University honored her with the Creative Spirit Award.

In 2019, she was named one of Wine Enthusiast's "40 Under 40 Tastemakers" and was also honored by the James Beard Foundation as a "Women's Entrepreneurial Leadership" fellow.

In 2023, she and her sister Robin were named in the Ebony Power 100 Dynamic Business Duo Award.
