= OEmbed =

Open specification for embedding website content

oEmbed is an open format designed to allow embedding content from a website into any webpage. The specification was created by Cal Henderson, Leah Culver, Mike Malone, and Richard Crowley in 2008. It is used by companies like Twitter to make tweets embeddable in blog posts and by blogging platforms like Medium to allow content authors to include those snippets.

An oEmbed exchange occurs between a consumer and a provider. A consumer wishes to show an embedded representation of a third-party resource on their own website, such as a photo or an embedded video. A provider implements the oEmbed API to allow consumers to fetch that representation.

The following software is able to embed content from websites that support oEmbed:

- Drupal
- HumHub
- LinkedIn
- Mastodon
- Squarespace
- WordPress

== Examples ==
Request:

https://www.youtube.com/oembed?url=https%3A//youtube.com/watch%3Fv%3DM3r2XDceM6A&format=json

Response:

{
	"version": "1.0",
	"type": "video",
	"provider_name": "YouTube",
	"provider_url": "https://youtube.com/",
	"width": 425,
	"height": 344,
	"title": "Amazing Nintendo Facts",
	"author_name": "ZackScott",
	"author_url": "https://www.youtube.com/user/ZackScott",
	"html":
		"<object width=\"425\" height=\"344\">
			<param name=\"movie\" value=\"https://www.youtube.com/v/M3r2XDceM6A&fs=1\"></param>
			<param name=\"allowFullScreen\" value=\"true\"></param>
			<param name=\"allowscriptaccess\" value=\"always\"></param>
			<embed src=\"https://www.youtube.com/v/M3r2XDceM6A&fs=1\"
				type=\"application/x-shockwave-flash\" width=\"425\" height=\"344\"
				allowscriptaccess=\"always\" allowfullscreen=\"true\"></embed>
		</object>",
}
