= Cathedral Building =

Coordinates: 37°48′22.25″N 122°16′12.93″W

- Federal Realty Building
- U.S. National Register of Historic Places
- Oakland Designated Landmark
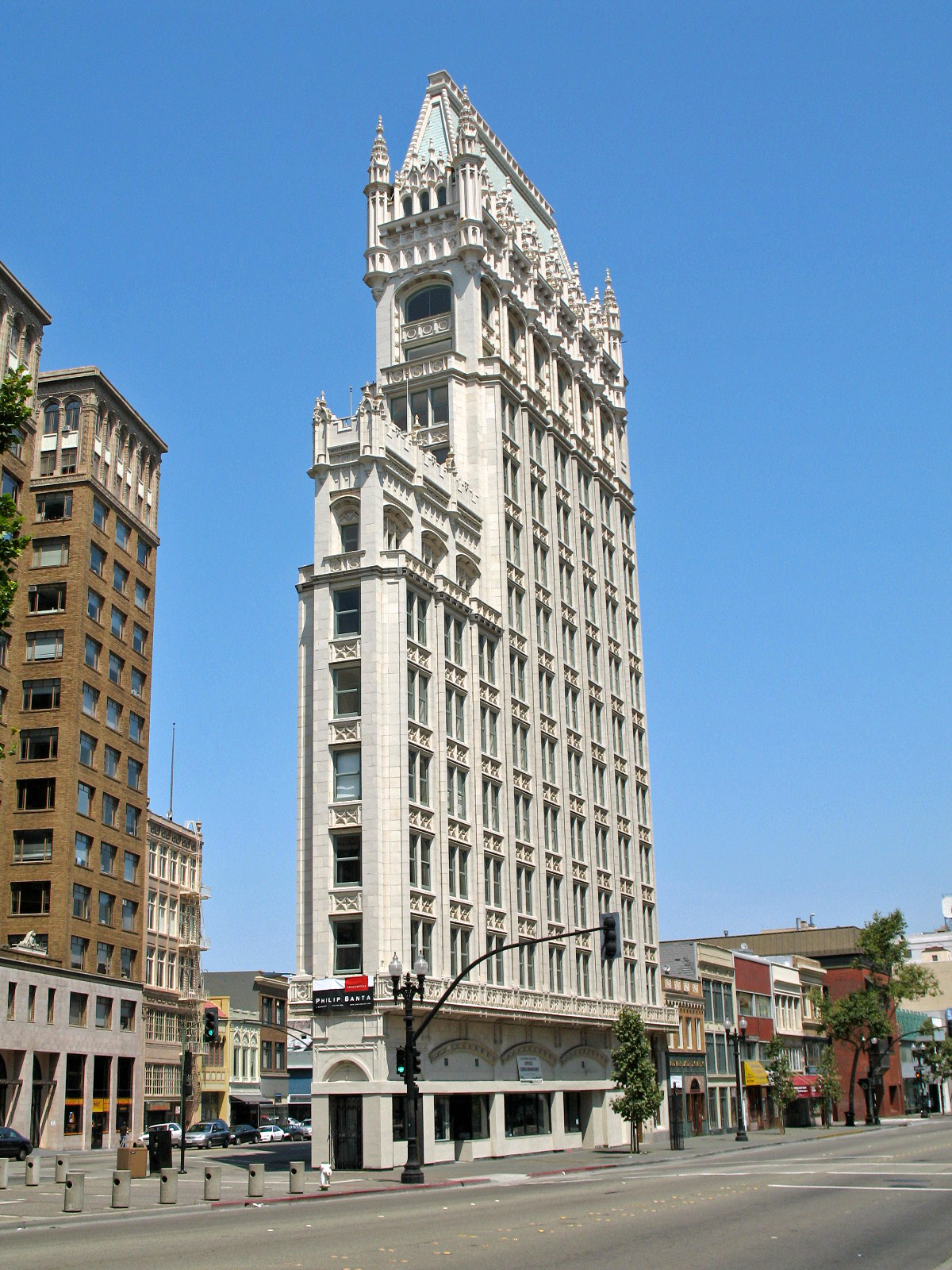

- Location within California Location within the United States
- Location: 1615 Broadway, Oakland, California
- Area: 0.1 acres (0.040 ha)
- Built: 1914
- Architect: Benjamin Geer McDougall
- Architectural style: Gothic Revival
- NRHP reference No.: 79000467
- ODL No.: 70

Significant dates
- Added to NRHP: January 2, 1979
- Designated ODL: 1983

The Cathedral Building (originally named the Federal Realty Building), built in 1914, was the first Gothic Revival style skyscraper west of the Mississippi River, located in Oakland, California.

== Description and history ==
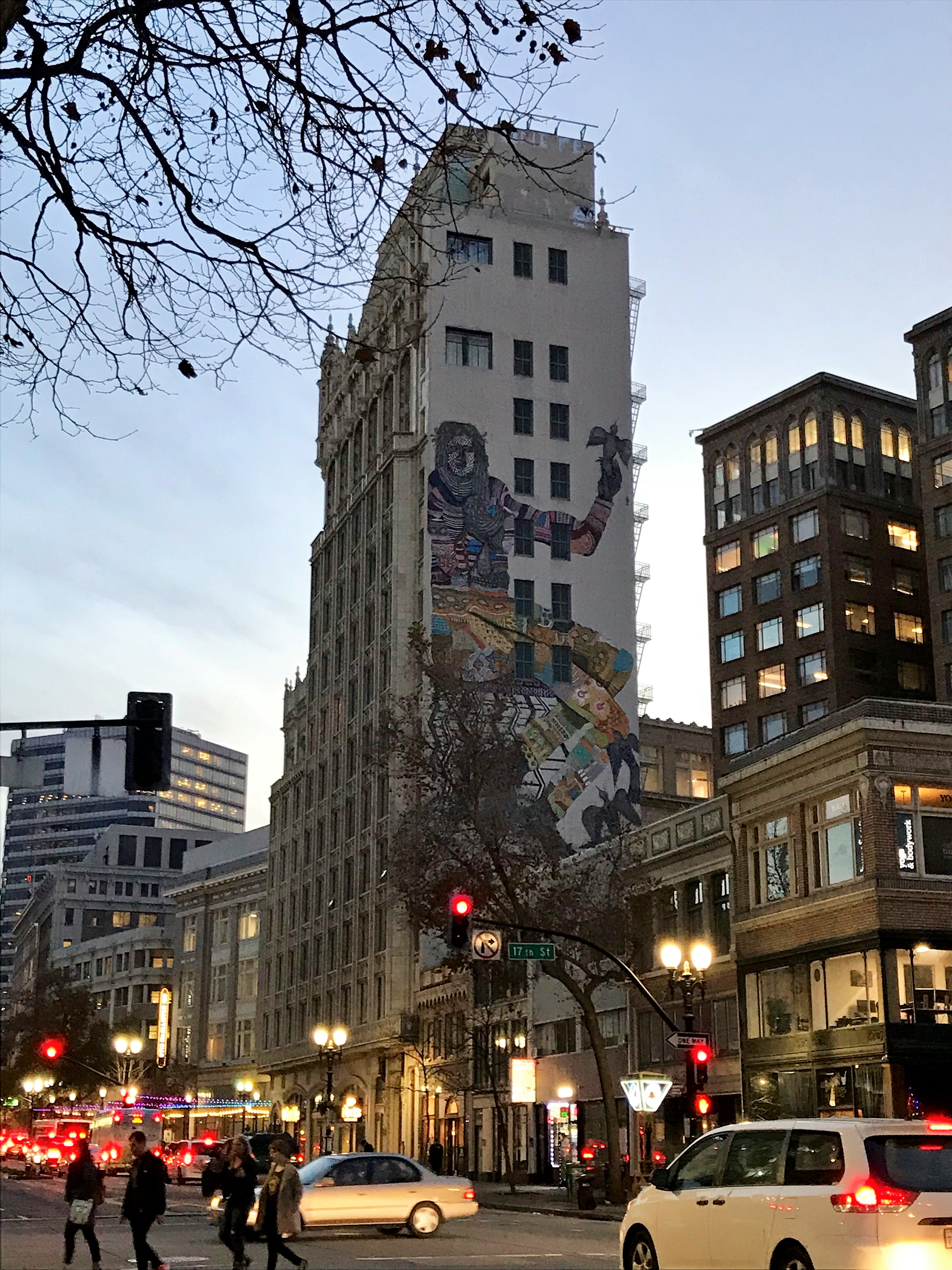
Zio Ziegler's United Nations mural on the north wall of the Cathedral Building

It is also called the "Wedding Cake" for its appearance, which resembles New York's Flatiron Building. Its narrow, triangular form is a result of its location on Latham Square, where Telegraph Avenue branches off diagonally from Broadway. It was designed by architect Benjamin Geer McDougall. It was developed by Brog Properties, a Downtown Oakland development firm who renovated the building for mixed residential and commercial units. In June 2015, the United Nations Foundation commissioned Bay Area street artist Zio Ziegler to create a mural on the Cathedral Building's north-facing wall. The mural commemorates the signing of the United Nations Charter in San Francisco, California on June 26, 1945.

The building was listed on the National Register of Historic Places on January 2, 1979.

In 2012, Oakland North reported that the ground-floor retail space of the Cathedral Building was occupied by Runway Style House (also referred to as Uptown Runway), a fashion and cultural retail concept founded by Oakland-based creative director, Alanna Rayford. The tenancy marked one of the first sustained commercial activations of the space in decades and included the adaptive reuse of the building’s basement level. At the time, Rayford was refurbishing the building’s basement level for cultural and arts-related use. The report also documented access to underground tunnel areas beneath the building.

The third floor of the Cathedral Building was the setting for Cassius's apartment in the Oakland-based Boots Riley film Sorry to Bother You.
