= Asynchronous computer-mediated communication =

Technologies where there is a delay in interaction between contributors

Asynchronous conferencing or asynchronous computer-mediated communication (asynchronous CMC) is the formal term used in science, in particular in computer-mediated communication, collaboration and learning, to describe technologies where there is a delay in interaction between contributors. It is used in contrast to synchronous conferencing, which refers to various "chat" systems in which users communicate simultaneously in "real time".
Especially in computer-mediated communication, it is emerging as a tool that can create opportunities for collaboration and support the inquiry process. In this form of communication, face-to-face conversation is not required, and the conversation can last for a long time. It has mostly been useful for online discussions and idea sharing which can be used for learning purpose or for solving problems over geographically diverse work-field.

== Tools ==
Asynchronous conferencing has been practiced for many years now in various forms. A variety of means for supporting this form of communication are as follows:

- Bulletin board
- E-mail
- Online forums/polls
- Blogs
- Wiki pages
- Listserv and newsgroup
- Social networking sites
- Shared calendars

== Features ==
Asynchronous conferencing allows for the participants to have flexibility and control over the time they spend on any topic. It can allow anonymous participation, encouraging reluctant members/learners to share their viewpoint. Moreover, it allows all the participants to contribute and communicate simultaneously on different topics. However, due to this time constraint, there is a delay between the message exchange. This delay can lead to loss of interest and affects the contextual structure and coherence of the discussion. Sometimes there might be too many posts made in a small amount time, making it hard to figure out the outcome of discussion.

This form of communication provides more convenience. The user can participate from anywhere, as long as there is connection to the conference. This is an advantage for people who work from home, work in different geographical regions or travel on business. Also, the topic can be accessed at any time, and this gives the participant time to think and reply. However, there is a lack of physical and social presence in this form of communication. Especially, in asynchronous text-based conferencing, the lack of presence amounts in a huge difference in the progress and outcome of the discussion. It lacks emotions and is more prone to interpretation error.

One of the more controversial topics about asynchronous conferencing is that the discussion thread might get deleted. This can happen either due to technical failure or from avoidance and loss of interest from the participants. As most threads are managed according to their access time, those threads with older access time might be replaced by ones with new access time.

== Types ==
Asynchronous conferencing is basically divided up into these following types:

- Text/Image based conferencing
- Voice based conferencing
- Video based conferencing

== Uses ==
This type of conferencing is mostly useful for business and/or learning purpose. Many of the universities are adopting online learning methods and using asynchronous conferencing to manage course-works and discussions. It is also used in public opinion sharing or voting through blogs, wiki pages, SMS texting and social networking sites.

== See also ==
- CONFER, developed in 1975 at the University of Michigan, was one of the first and one of the most sophisticated computer conferencing systems.
- Synchronous conferencing
