= A. H. Ziegler =

American lawyer and politician

Adolph Holton Ziegler

Member of the Alaska House of Representatives from the 1st district
- In office March 4, 1929 – March 6, 1933 Serving with Grover C. Winn (1929-1933); Peter C. McCormack (1929-1931); Allen Shattuck (1929-1931); J.E. Johnson (1931-1933); Frank A. Boyle (1931-1933)

Member of the Alaska House of Representatives from the 1st district
- In office January 14, 1935 – January 11, 1937 Serving with F.J. Baronovich; Joe Green; Arthur P. Walker

Personal details
- Born: Adolph Holton Ziegler; December 20, 1889; Easton, Maryland, U.S.
- Died: May 17, 1972 (aged 82); Seattle, Washington, U.S.
- Political party: Democratic

Adolph Holton Ziegler (December 20, 1889 – May 17, 1972) was an American lawyer and politician.

Born in Easton, Maryland, Ziegler studied law in Easton and then moved to Alaska Territory where he studied law and was admitted to the Alaska bar. During World War I, Ziegler served in the United States Navy and was in the intelligence service. In 1919, he moved to Ketchikan, Alaska and owned the Ziegler House (Ketchikan, Alaska). In 1929, 1931 to 1935, Ziegler served in the Alaska Territorial House of Representatives and in 1938 and 1939 was mayor of Ketchikan, Alaska. He also served on the Alaska Territorial Board of Education from 1935 until 1959. His son was Bob Ziegler, who served in the Alaska Territorial and State Legislatures. Ziegler died in a hospital in Seattle, Washington.
