= Grove.io =

Chat application

Grove.io was originally Convore, a real-time chat web application created by co-founders Eric Florenzano, Leah Culver, and Eric Maguire.

PC World said "It works as a news aggregate as well as a question/answer forum for its myriad of topics"; according to MIT Technology Review, it had "the polish and responsiveness that most new sites of its ilk lack."

In January 2012, Convore pivoted into Grove.io, with a focus on providing services for businesses, and touting as a core feature that it was based on IRC. The imminent closure of the Convore service was announced on their own website and on Twitter in February.

In October 2016, Grove.io announced that they were closing down, and recommended users to use Slack as a replacement.
