= Christin Ziegler =

German politician (born 1989)

Member of the Landtag of Hesse
- Incumbent
- Assumed office 18 January 2024
- Preceded by: Regine Müller
- Constituency: Schwalm-Eder II

Personal details
- Born: 13 April 1989 (age 37)
- Party: Christian Democratic Union (since 2006)

Christin Ziegler (born 13 April 1989) is a German politician serving as a member of the Landtag of Hesse since 2024. She is the group leader of the Christian Democratic Union in the city council of Schwarzenborn.
