= M. G. Siegler =

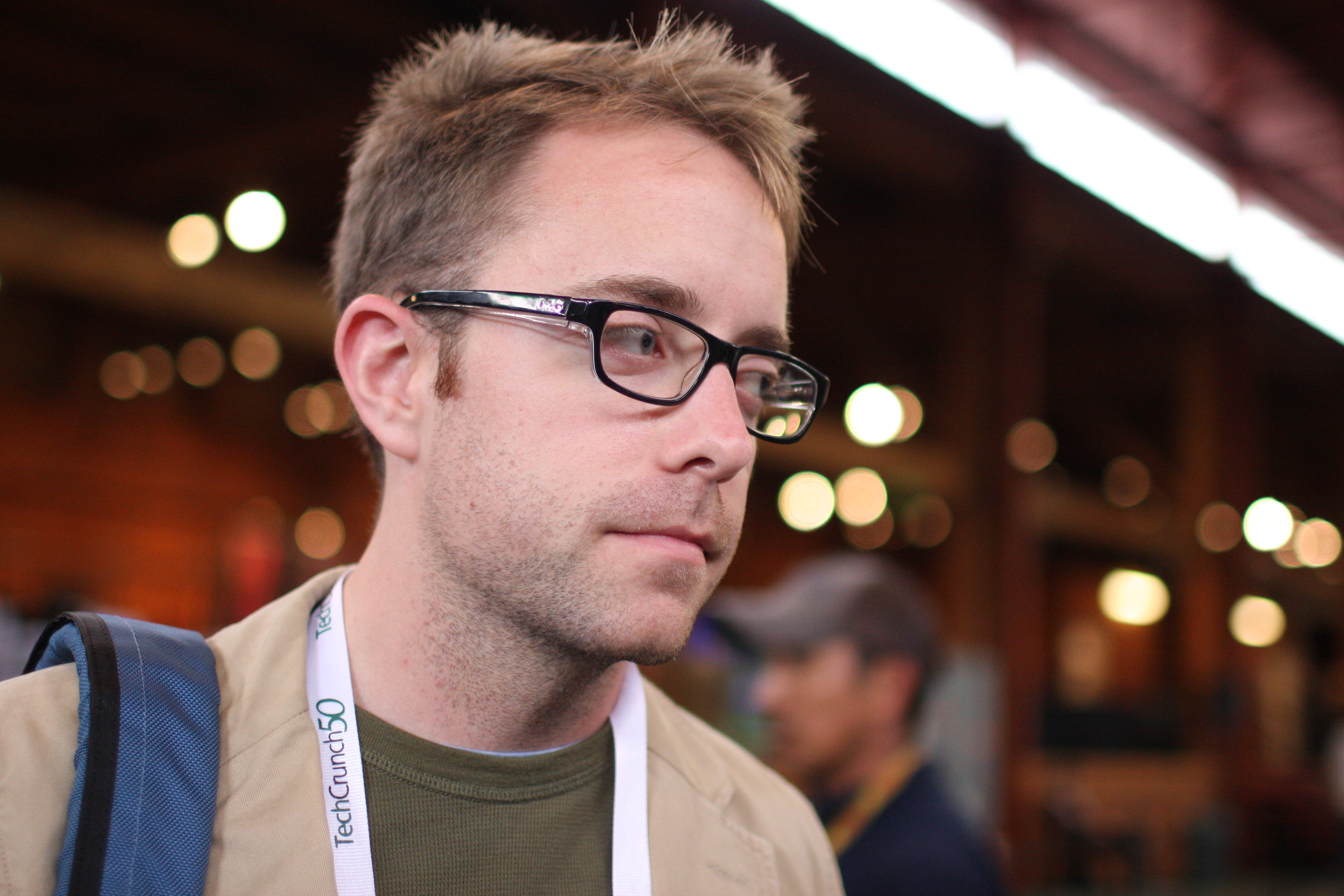
M.G. Siegler in 2008

M.G. Siegler (born November 2, 1981) is an independent investor and writer. He was a partner at Google Ventures from 2013 to 2024, where he primarily focused on seed and early-stage investments.

== Early life and education ==
He is originally from Ohio, and obtained his B.S. from the University of Michigan in 2004.

== Career ==
After graduation, he moved out to Los Angeles to get a job in Hollywood, and took on tasks such as a set PA and a script reader. He then moved to San Diego, where he did front-end web development. During his stint as a web developer, he started taking blogging more seriously, which helped him get noticed by VentureBeat. He became a blogger for VentureBeat from 2007 to 2009, and a blogger for TechCrunch from 2009 to 2014. As a blogger, much of his blogging focused on Apple, and he was "known best for his unabashed pro-Apple bias". He became a partner at CrunchFund in 2011, where he helped build a portfolio including Airbnb, Betable, Crowdtilt, Ifttt, Karma, Mailbox, Path, Square, Uber, Vine, and Yammer. He left CrunchFund for Google Ventures in May 2013. In June 2024 he left Google Ventures to become an independent investor and writer.

He serves on the board for Slack. He has invested in companies like Medium and Secret. He regularly maintains a blog on Medium called "500ish Words", and was interviewed in the documentary The Startup Kids.
