= Mel and Patricia Ziegler =

American businesspeople

Mel Ziegler and Patricia Ziegler are an American business couple. They are the founders of Banana Republic, a clothing and accessory retailer. Alongside William Rosenzweig, they co-founded The Republic of Tea. They eventually sold both companies.

== Early careers ==
Both Zieglers worked at San Francisco Chronicle -- Patricia an illustrator and Mel a reporter.

== Apparel career ==
The Zieglers founded Banana Republic in Mill Valley, California, in 1978. The brand's safari-style clothing was styled by Patricia Ziegler. Mel wrote the catalog. Upon hearing the business's name, a friend told the Zieglers, "Bad choice. You'll be picketed by people from small hot countries."

The brand grew quickly, propelled by the popular 1981 movie Raiders of the Lost Ark. The Zieglers abruptly resigned in 1988. By then, the business had 1110 stores and annual sales of a quarter of a billion dollars. The relationship between the Zieglers and Don Fisher, founder of Gap Inc, deteriorated when the Zieglers wanted to publish a travel magazine and began selling it in their stores.

In October 2000, the Zieglers launched an apparel company named ZoZa, influenced by Zen.

Their eldest son, Zio Ziegler, is a large-scale metal sculptor, painter, and street artist. The couple published a 2012 memoir titled Wild Company, The Untold Story of Banana Republic.

== Personal ==
The Zieglers moved to the foothills of Mount Tamalpais above Mill Valley and renovated a 1929 house in a project that cost an estimated $2 million.

== Bibliography ==
- Ziegler, Mel; Rosenzweig, Bill; Ziegler, Patricia (1992). The Republic of Tea : letters to a young zentrepeneur. New York: Currency Doubleday. ISBN 978-0-385-42056-3. OCLC 645832406. Later re-published as: Ziegler, Mel; Rosenzweig, Bill; Ziegler, Patricia (September 1, 1994) [1992]. The republic of tea : the story of the creation of a business, as told through the personal letters of its founders (1st Currency paperback ed.). New York: Crown Publishing Group. ISBN 978-0-385-42057-0. OCLC 31302063.
