= Christian Ziegler =

German photojournalist, wildlife photographer

Christian Ziegler is a German photojournalist, BBC Wildlife Photographer of the Year in 2005, and regular contributor to National Geographic. He is known for his photography at the Smithsonian Tropical Research Institute and a forest in Barro Colorado Island, which was used in a science book called A Magic Web, published by Oxford University Press in 2002. Later on, he collaborated with Egbert Leigh as a co-author and together they published a book of orchids which was published in 2011 by University of Chicago Press. Currently he is a member of the Photo Society.
