= Bob Ziegler =

American politician and lawyer

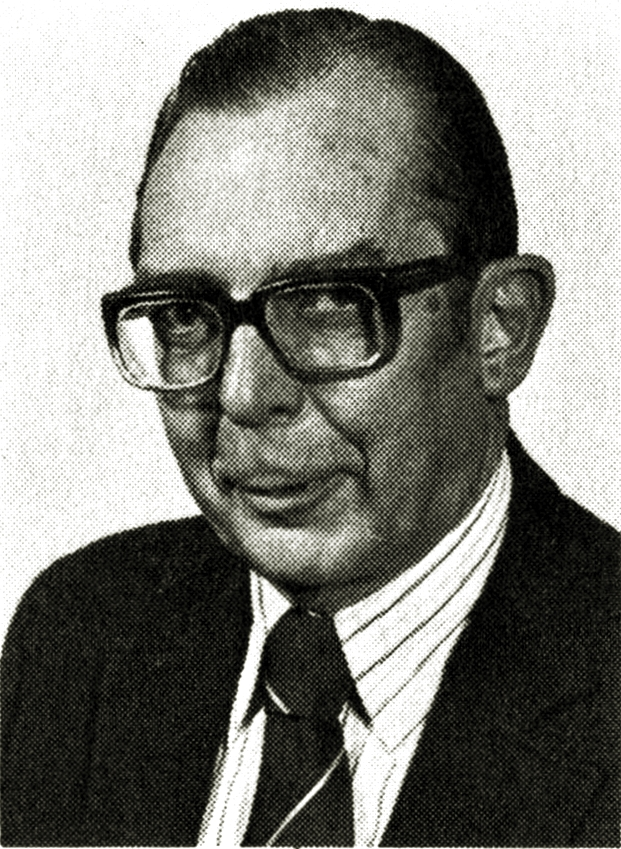
Bob Ziegler in 1977

Robert Holton Ziegler, Sr. (March 27, 1921 – September 29, 1991) was an American lawyer and politician.

Born in Baltimore, Maryland, Ziegler served in the United States Army Medical Corps during World War II. He then received his law degree from the University of Virginia School of Law in 1948. He then moved to Ketchikan, Alaska and practiced law with his father A. H. Ziegler who served in the Alaska Territorial Legislature. From 1957 until 1959, Ziegler served in the Alaska Territorial House of Representatives and was a Democrat. Then from 1965 until 1987. Ziegler served in the Alaska Senate. He owned the Ziegler House (Ketchikan, Alaska). Ziegler died of cancer in Ketchikan, Alaska.

Alaska Senate
Preceded by Walter Bo (W. O.) Smith	Member of the Alaska Senate from B district 1965–1967	Succeeded by Howard C. Bradshaw
Preceded by Frank Peratrovich	Member of the Alaska Senate from A district 1967–1987	Succeeded by Lloyd Jones
