= Seigler =

Seigler is a surname. Notable people with the surname include:

- Anthony Seigler (born 1999), American baseball player
- Richard Seigler (born 1980), American football player and coach
- Tommy Seigler (1938–2023), American professional wrestler

== See also ==
- Seigler Springs, California, an unincorporated community in Lake County, California, United States
