= Canned wine =

Wine packaged in a can

Canned wine is wine packaged in a can. Driven by demand for small format, convenient and environmentally sustainable packaging for wine, wine in a can has boomed in Asian markets for over a decade and more recently in the USA, Canada, United Kingdom, Australia and New Zealand.

== Difficulties in canning wine ==
Wines & Vines magazine published an article in its December 2004 edition titled "Wine in Cans: improving the process". Author Tina Caputo explained that US wineries first began trying to can wine in 1936, the year after beer was first successfully packaged in cans. However, these canning attempts all failed, primarily as they could not produce a stable wine in a can product. In the December 1950 issue of the American Journal of Enology and Viticulture, Leo A. Berti wrote "The commercial failure of the 1936-1939 packs of wine can be traced to the same problems that trouble us today - the inherent instability of wine packaged, packaging diseased wine and occluding too much oxygen in the package."

Wineries persisted in attempting to solve these problems, and from the 1950s to the early 1990s many wineries in the USA and Europe, including Stowells of Chelsea in the UK, continued to try and can wine without success, as all these experiments were short lived and the wine collapsed within the can within a very short time (less than a few months). Stability and longevity were the key problems as the aggressive elements within wine itself attacked the can lining and aluminium can, thereby promoting interaction with the lining and aluminium can corrosion which resulted in the can leaking and an unpleasant hydrogen sulfide or a rotten egg smell when the can was opened.

== Wine in a can packaging break through ==
Canned wine was first produced in Italy by Giacobazzi in 1982. In 1996 Australian wine producer, Barokes decided to take on the challenge to solve the many problems that had prevented successful canning of wine. Barokes founders, Greg Stokes and Steve Barics commenced five years of intensive R&D and by the early 2000s Barokes solved the problem of wine in a can and patented the product and a process for packaging wine in aluminium cans.

== Early success ==
One of the first markets to embrace this new product and category for wine was Japan. From 2002 the Barokes wine in a can products was available to Japanese consumers. Asian markets generally have led the charge with adoption of wine in a can from 2005 onwards. This uptake by Asian consumers was due to the lack of preconceived ideas as to how wine should be packaged and their familiarity with premium beverages in aluminium can, such as coffee.

== Global acceptance of the wine in a can category ==
Since 2014 the wine in a can category has grown significantly in other regions as well, including Australia, New Zealand, the United States and United Kingdom.

Most major wine producers globally have now entered the wine in a can category.

In Australia liquor outlets range a number of quality wine in a can products including Jacobs Creek, Joiy, Crafters Union, Take it to the Grave, Elephant in the Room, Mascareri, Hootenanny and Le Chat Noir, Rose Rose, Brown Brothers Prosecco Spritz and Moscato One brands and CUB's Sonder wines in a can.

In the USA over 300 wine in a can products have been launched since 2014. The largest players in the USA market are EJ Gallo with its Barefoot Refresh Spritzers, Francis Ford Coppola Winery with the Sofia Mini, Underwood, Babe, to name a few and canned wine sales in the USA estimated at $93 million in 2019
