= Banana Republic =

American clothing and accessory retailer

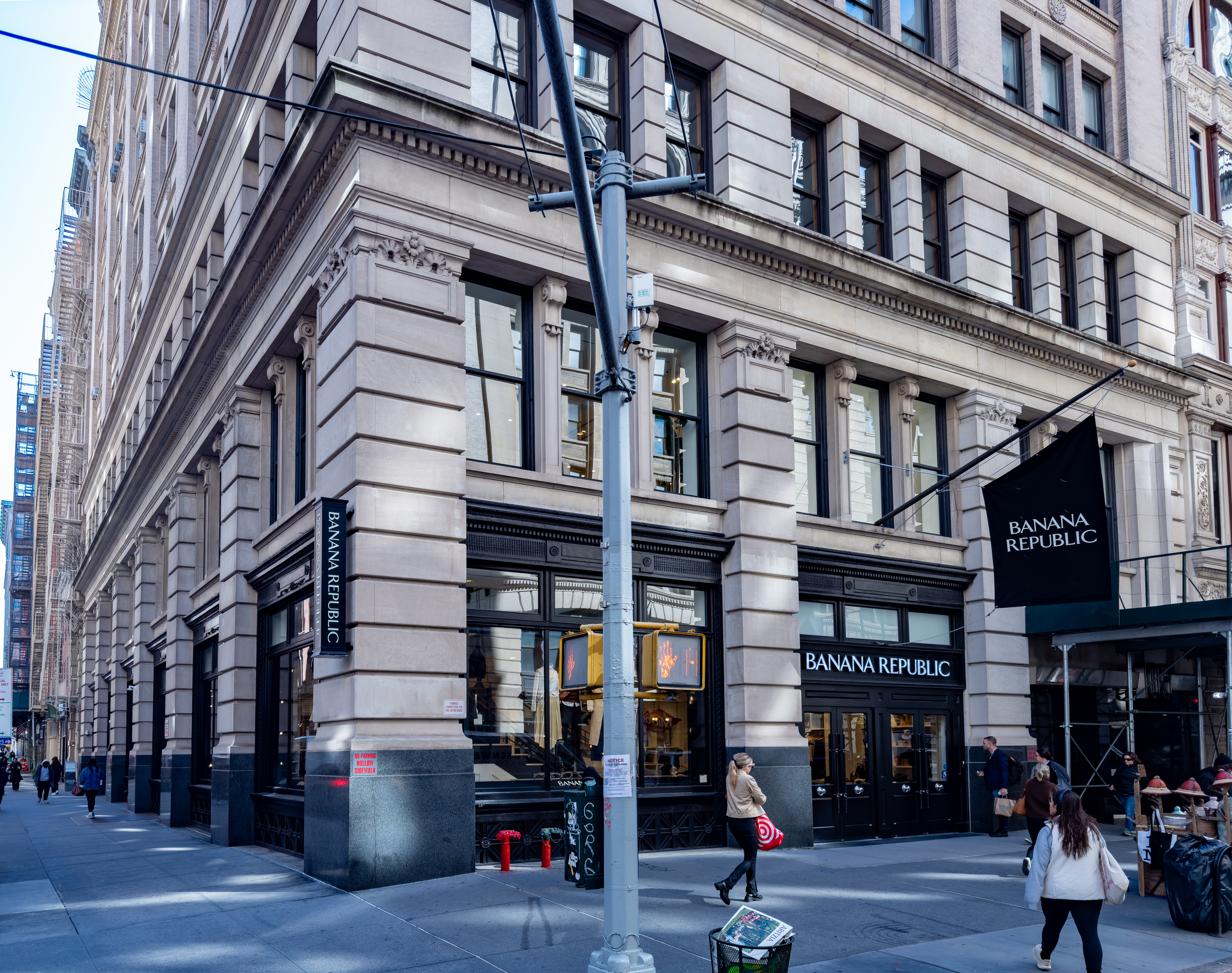
- Flagship Store in Manhattan
- Type: Division of Gap
- Industry: Retail
- Founded: 1978; 48 years ago Mill Valley, California, U.S.
- Founders: Mel Ziegler; Patricia Ziegler
- Headquarters: San Francisco, California, U.S.
- Number of locations: 400+ (2026)
- Area served: Worldwide
- Key people: Richard Dickson (CEO of parent Gap Inc.)
- Products: Clothing
- Parent: Gap Inc. (1983–present)
- Website: www.BananaRepublic.com

Banana Republic is an American upscale clothing and accessories retailer owned by The Gap. It was founded in 1978 by Mel and Patricia Ziegler, who named the company "Banana Republic Travel & Safari Clothing Company". In 1983, Gap purchased the company, shortened its name to "Banana Republic", and rebranded the stores to achieve a more upscale image.

In the 2020s, VP of design Nicole Wiesmann has re-envisioned the brand with ad editorial campaigns that evoke luxury brands, and higher-end garments that have been compared favorably with names such as Ralph Lauren and The Row.

== History ==
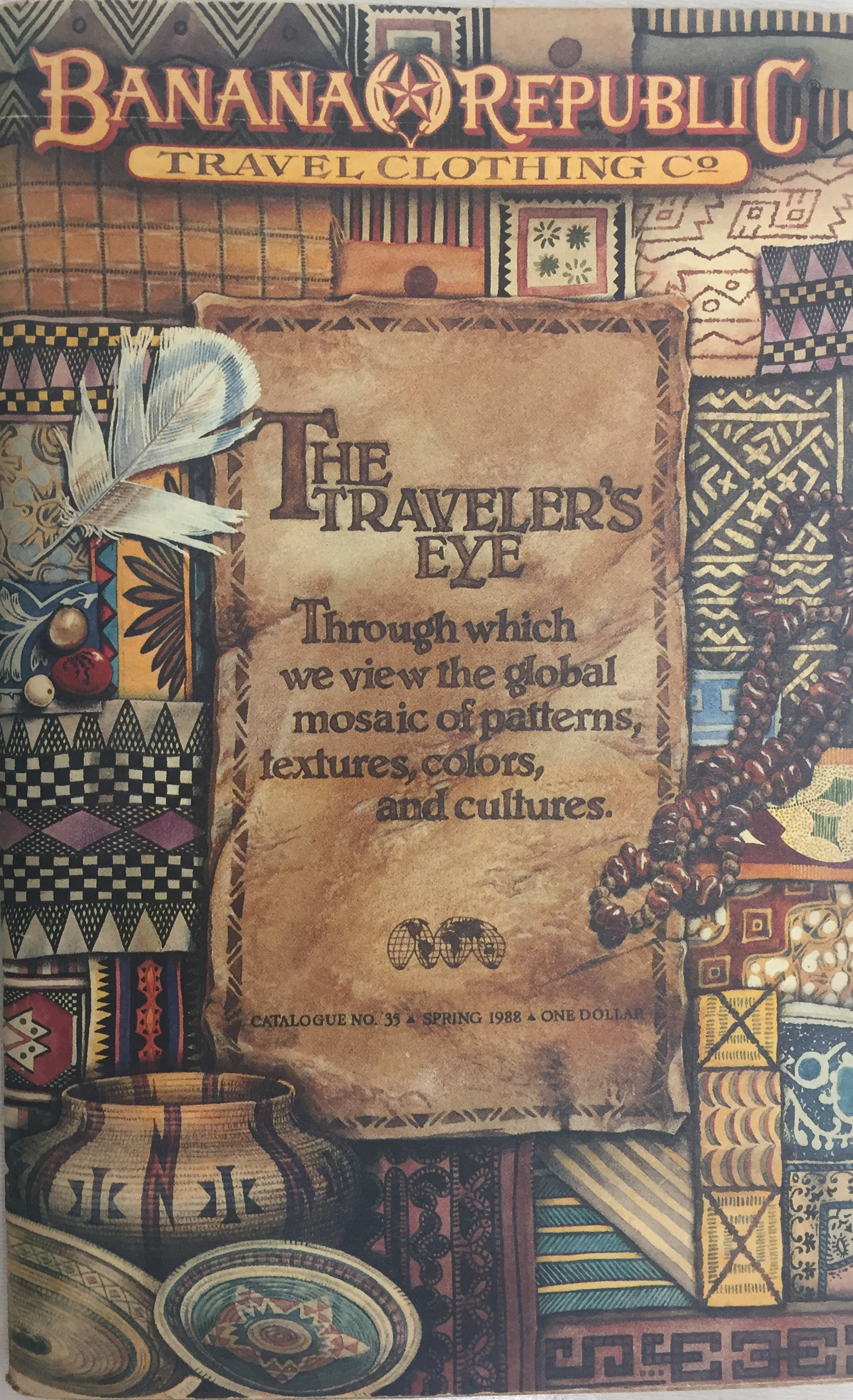
Banana Republic Travel Clothing Catalog No. 35, Spring 1988

The original Banana Republic was founded by Mel and Patricia Ziegler in 1978. The couple worked for the San Francisco Chronicle; Mel was a reporter and Patricia an illustrator. They lived in an apartment on Russian Hill. In 1978, they quit their jobs and moved to Tamalpais Valley. Soon after, Mel received a magazine assignment to explore Australia for a few weeks with other journalists. In Australia, Mel bought a war surplus British Burma jacket. Then they bought 500 Spanish Civil War Army paratrooper shirts for $1.50 each, selling them at a Sunday flea market in Marin City, California.

The couple was known for acquiring interesting clothing items that their travel-related jobs brought them in contact with, and they eventually opened a store in Mill Valley. They were known for a hand-drawn catalogue of items with traveler/explorer stories printed alongside, and their safari-themed retail locations. The Zieglers recount their adventures in the first ten years in their memoir, Wild Company, published in 2012 by Simon and Schuster.

Gap Inc. acquired Banana Republic in 1983. By 1988 the founders, Mel and Patricia Ziegler, lost creative control, eventually rebranding it as masstige, an accessible mass luxury clothing retailer. The literate articles, hand-drawn catalog, and eccentric tourist-oriented items were phased out and were replaced with more luxurious, but not unique, items for which the brand would eventually become known, currently replacing higher quality materials for mass quality lower cost fabric standards.

== Retail history ==
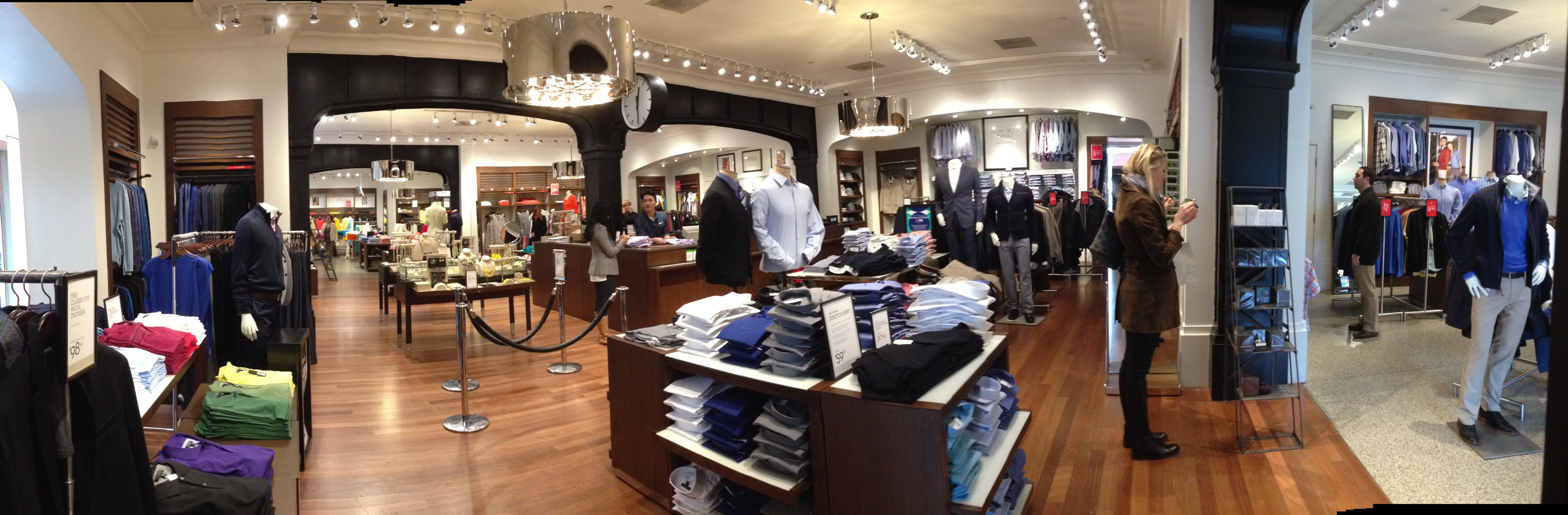
Inside the Banana Republic

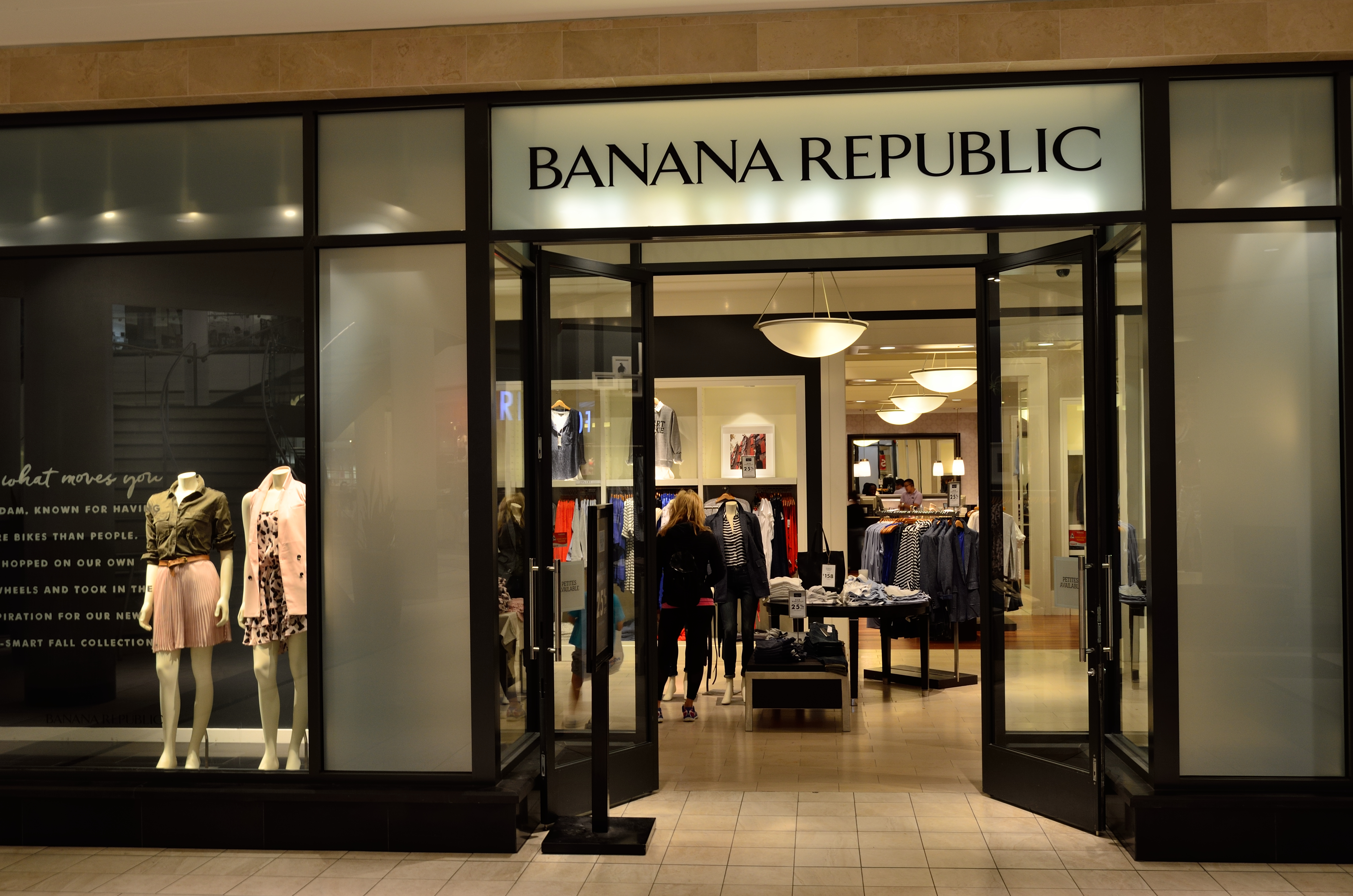
Banana Republic in Markville Shopping Centre

In 2015 Banana Republic opened a new flagship in Manhattan on Fifth Avenue and 18th Street.

Banana Republic opened its first store outside North America in 2005 in Tokyo's Ginza shopping district. Banana Republic's presence in South Korea debuted in August 2007 with a store in the Apgujeong district of Seoul.

In 2007, the first Banana Republic stores opened at The Avenues shopping mall in Kuwait City, Kuwait; Senayan City in Jakarta, Indonesia; and Pavilion Kuala Lumpur in Kuala Lumpur, Malaysia.

Banana Republic opened its first store in Turkey in March 2008 in the Kanyon Shopping Mall in Istanbul. By May 2008, İstinye Park Shopping Mall and Nişantaşı stores were also opened in Istanbul. More stores are planned to be opened in Ankara and İzmir by the end of 2008 to bring the total number of stores in Turkey to six.

Banana Republic opened in Saudi Arabia in late 2008, with a store in Mall of Arabia in Jeddah and a second in Riyadh Gallery Mall in Riyadh in March 2009.

In March 2008, Banana Republic opened its 17,000-square-foot (1,600 m^{2}) store on Regent Street in London, England. On May 9, 2008, Banana Republic opened its store on Greenbelt 5 in Makati, Philippines.

In October 2016, Banana Republic announced that it would close all its UK stores by the end of the year, due to falling sales. As of 2017, Banana Republic had over 700 locations, but as a result of European stores' closures, there are none left in Europe.

In August 2020, Banana Republic alongside Gap announced that they will close over 225 store locations as a result of the COVID-19 pandemic. The original plan was to close only 90 stores. However, they expanded the number as a consequence of the financial effects caused by the pandemic. The company has not stated the exact locations that will be closed, but most will be stores within malls.

Banana Republic produced a fall/winter capsule collection with New York–based fashion designer Peter Do in 2023.

== Clothing lines ==
Collections

- BR Monogram
- Heritage
- Sunday Sunday
- BR Sport (2021)
- BR Baby
- BR Athletics

Capsule collections

- Trina Turk
- Anna Karenina
- Mad Men
- Milly NY
- Issa London
- L'Wren Scott
- Marimekko
- Roland Mouret

== Stores ==
In 2011, Banana Republic had 682 company-owned or franchised stores in operation across 32 countries, shipped to 21 countries through company owned websites, and had the ability to ship to more than 50 countries through a third party. By late 2022, the total number of US stores fell to just 379, including three outlets in Puerto Rico, while the number of outlets in Canada climbed to 62. The company closed all eight of its UK and Ireland stores in 2016, and shut down all of the brand's European websites in May 2022. As of January 2025, Banana Republic has 18 stores in Japan, counting regular and outlet stores. The newest opening was on January 31 in Toranomon Hills.

== See also ==
- Dead mall
- Retail apocalypse
