= Ziegler House (Ketchikan, Alaska) =

Historic house in Alaska, United States

- U.S. National Register of Historic Places
- Alaska Heritage Resources Survey
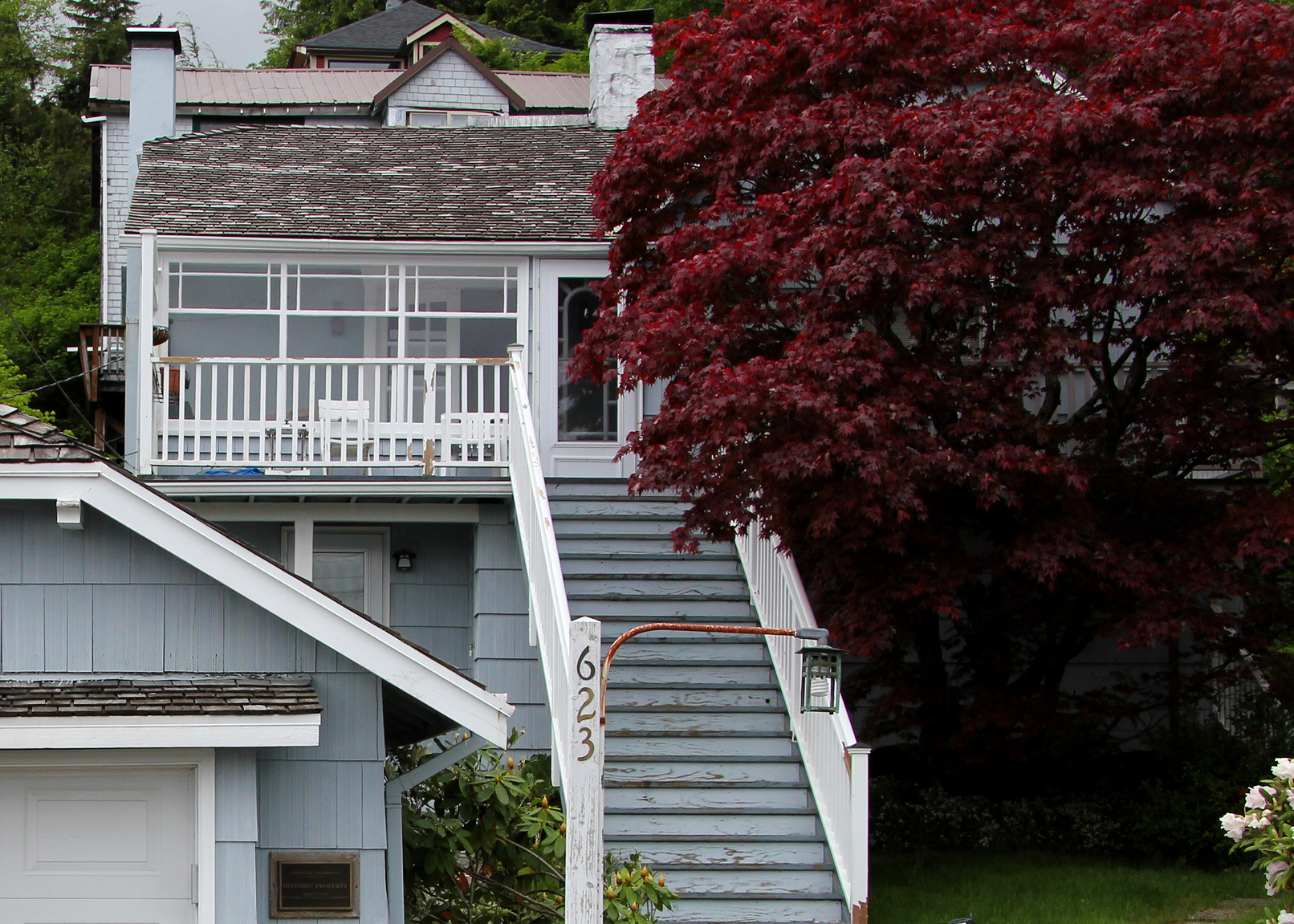

- Location within Alaska
- Location: 623 Grant Street, Ketchikan, Alaska
- Coordinates: 55°20′40″N 131°38′43″W
- Area: less than one acre
- Built: 1922
- NRHP reference No.: 85001161
- AHRS No.: KET-086

Significant dates
- Added to NRHP: May 30, 1985
- Designated AHRS: March 21, 1985

The Ziegler House, also known as the Ziegler/Pitcher House, is a historic house at 623 Grant Street in Ketchikan, Alaska. It is a two-story wood frame residence, set on a hillside. It is roughly rectangular in shape, with a hip roof with clipped-gable ends. The house was built as a relatively small structure in 1911, and underwent a significant expansion in 1922 to achieve its present appearance. The house has been the longtime home of members of the locally prominent Ziegler family, and was built by Adolph Holton Ziegler (1889–1970) who served as mayor of Ketchikan and in the territorial legislature. His son, Robert Holton Ziegler, became a prominent local lawyer, serving in the territorial and then state legislatures.

The house was listed on the National Register of Historic Places in 1985.

== See also ==
- National Register of Historic Places listings in Ketchikan Gateway Borough, Alaska
