= Ensisheim Central Prison =

Prison in Ensisheim, France

Coordinates: 47°51′52″N 7°21′06″E

Ensisheim Central Prison is a French prison located in Ensisheim, in the Haut-Rhine department, in the Grand Est region of France. It was constructed around 1614 as a Jesuit college, which was closed when the Jesuits were expelled in 1765.

The prison is administered by the multi-regional directorate of prison services in Strasbourg.

The main prison building is listed as a historic monument.

== History ==
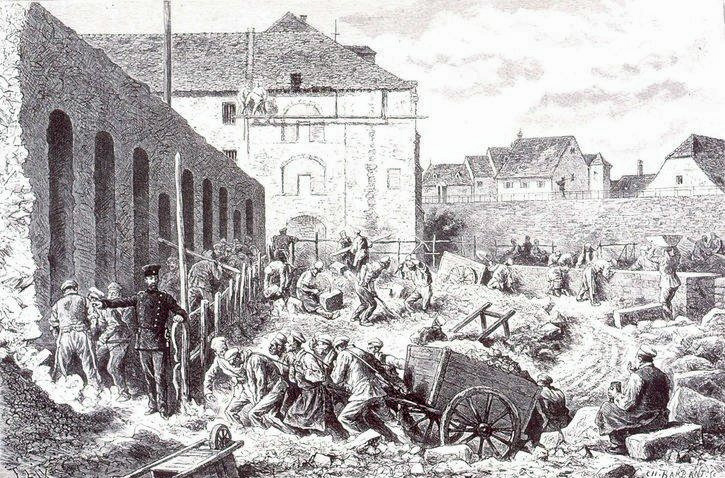
Prisonniers de la maison centrale travaillant aux fondations de la prison cellulaire d'Ensisheim (Frédéric Lix, 1889).

=== 17th and 18th centuries - Jesuit college ===
When the Jesuits established themselves in Alsace, they took over the school, which had been founded by the priest of Ensisheim, Jean Rasser, in 1583.

The small college included five classes, a boarding school and a chapel. This school was intended to promote Catholic teaching, and improve education, in a region where Lutherans were actively present.

=== 19th century - Conversion into prison ===
By an imperial decree of 23 February 1811, the buildings were redesigned by architect Louis-Ambroise Dubut for prisoners serving terms of imprisonment of more than one year.

=== 20th century ===
In 1938, after the abolition of French penal colonies, many prisoners from those prisons were sent to Ensisheim to complete their sentences.

== Description ==
Covering an area of 182 hectares, the prison has 205 cells and accommodates around 200 prisoners, mainly those sentenced to long sentences or life in prison.

Part of the main building has been registered as an historical building since 1987. The prison guard quarters, built in the 19th century, are also protected.

== Incidents ==
In April 1988, some of the prison's historic buildings were damaged in a fire after a mutiny broke out.

Between January 2010 and June 2017, there were at least 4 hostage incidents at the prison.

== Notorious detainees ==
Amongst the prison's most notorious detainees have included:

- Jean Paul Leconte, the serial killer and rapist known as «The Killer of the Somme»;
- Nordine Kelkal, brother of the Algerian Islamist terrorist Khaled Kelkal, responsible for a wave of attacks committed in France in 1995;
- Abane Ramdane, Algerian political activist and revolutionary;
- Jean-Jacques Susini, one of the leaders of the OAS, a far-right paramilitary and terrorist organisation.

== Prison in popular culture ==
The short story «La Vengeance du pardon» (2017) by Éric-Emmanuel Schmitt is set in the prison.
