= Zen Internet =

Internet service provider in England

Coordinates: 53°36′10.08″N 2°9′36.36″W

Zen Internet Ltd.
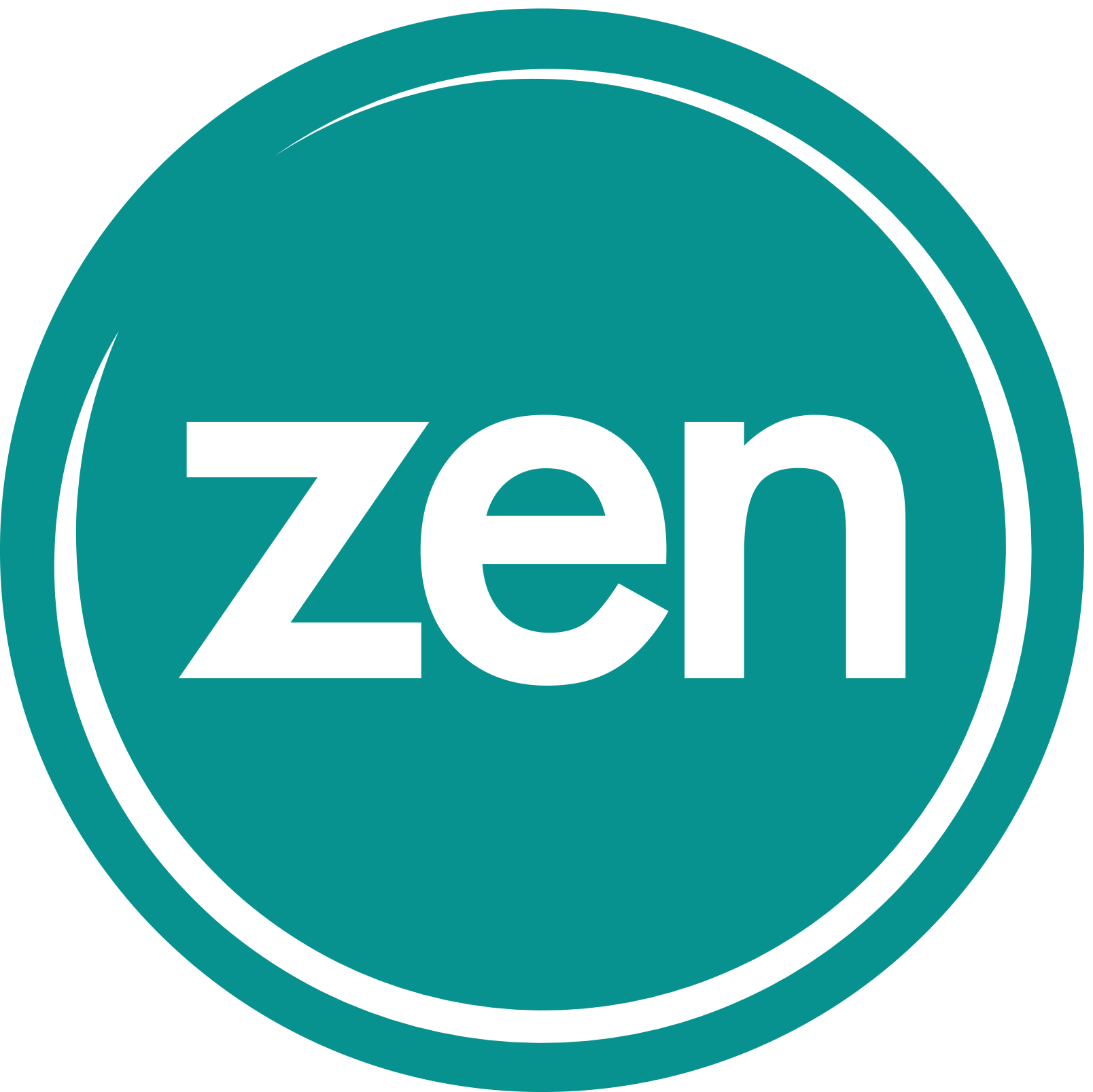
- Type: Limited
- Industry: Internet
- Founded: 1995
- Headquarters: Rochdale, England, UK
- Key people: Richard Tang (CEO)
- Products: Internet Services
- Number of employees: 550 (August 2023)
- Website: www.zen.co.uk

Zen Internet is an Internet service provider (ISP) based in Rochdale, England.

== History ==
Zen Internet was founded in 1995 by Richard Tang (then Managing Director, now CEO) after a drink in the pub, and was one of the first ISPs in the United Kingdom. Zen began by providing Internet access to schools and small businesses in the Rochdale area.

In February 2008, the company announced they would not be speaking to or partnering with Phorm, a controversial advertising company hoping to purchase user data from UK Internet service providers.

In April 2008, Zen Internet moved all its employees from their purpose-built HQ on Moss Bridge Road in Rochdale into the much larger Sandbrook House offices located at Sandbrook Park (Rochdale), a move part funded by the North West Regional Development Agency.

In August 2008, after the BBC proposed changing their content delivery provider for their iPlayer streaming service, Zen Internet warned that costs would increase once the move to Level3 was complete.

Zen provides broadband to both businesses and home users. They were one of the early ISPs to offer 'self-install ADSL' and designed their network not to rely on other providers for backbone. Zen Internet are currently a member of the CISAS (Communication and Internet Services Adjudication Scheme), an alternative dispute resolution scheme giving access to independent and speedy conflict resolution.

In December 2025, it was announced that Zen had agreed to acquire the UK consumer broadband customer base of Lit Fibre, following Lit Fibre’s decision to exit the retail internet access market. The transaction involved the migration of Lit Fibre’s customers to Zen Internet, with the transition expected to begin in January 2026.

== Products ==
Using Juniper and Cisco hardware, the Zen core network is run over four POPs, one in their home town of Rochdale, and three others in Equinix in Manchester, Telehouse and Interxion in London.

Zen Internet is a member of the UK peering points LINX, LONAP, MaNAP and IX Manchester. In 2005, Zen unbundled the Rochdale exchange followed by the Bury, Oldham and Blackfriars exchanges in 2006 to provide an unbundled service to local residents and businesses. Zen have six main product areas:

- Broadband: fibre broadband using FTTP and FTTC, ADSL, DSL Hardware & SoGEA
- Security services: UTM firewalls, content filtering
- Domain and hosting services: Data centre, shared hosting (Windows & Linux), dedicated server hosting, managed hosting, domain names, colocation, cloud hosting
- Leased Lines: Ethernet in the First Mile (EFM), access (Up to 2 Mbit/s), Ethernet (2 Mbit/s – 1 Gbit/s), private wide area networks
- Design and marketing services: website design, content management systems, e-commerce websites, intranet/extranet site design and build, search engine optimisation, email marketing, social media marketing
- Voice: Phone services, SIP trunking – Business Talk SIP, VOIP – broadband voice, ISDN30

== Awards ==
In 2006, the company won several awards at the Internet Service Providers' Association (ISPA) annual awards ceremony. These awards were: "best business ISP", "best heavy business broadband", and "best uncontended service".

The company featured in the Sunday Times Tech Track 100 from 2003 to 2006 as well as featuring in the Sunday Times Fast Track 100 in 2004.

In 2010, Managing Director Richard Tang was named Customer Service Entrepreneur of the Year by Ernst & Young at an awards ceremony in Manchester. This award recognised the retraining scheme introduced by the company in the Rochdale area.
