= London Internet Providers Exchange =

Former Internet exchange point in London, England

London Internet Providers EXchange
- Founded: 2001
- Location: London, United Kingdom
- Website: www.lipex.net
- Peak: 240 Mbit/s (February 2004) (Highest Known)

The London Internet Providers EXchange ("LIPEX") was an Internet Exchange Point situated in London. It was founded in 2001 by three directors of commercial Internet service providers: Panny Malialis of Hotlinks, Chris Smith of The Communication Gateway Ltd and Boyan Marinkovich of Routo Telecom Ltd as a free of charge Internet Exchange Point sponsored by Allied Telesyn. In 2002 Panny Malialis took over sole running of LIPEX and changed it into a commercial business.

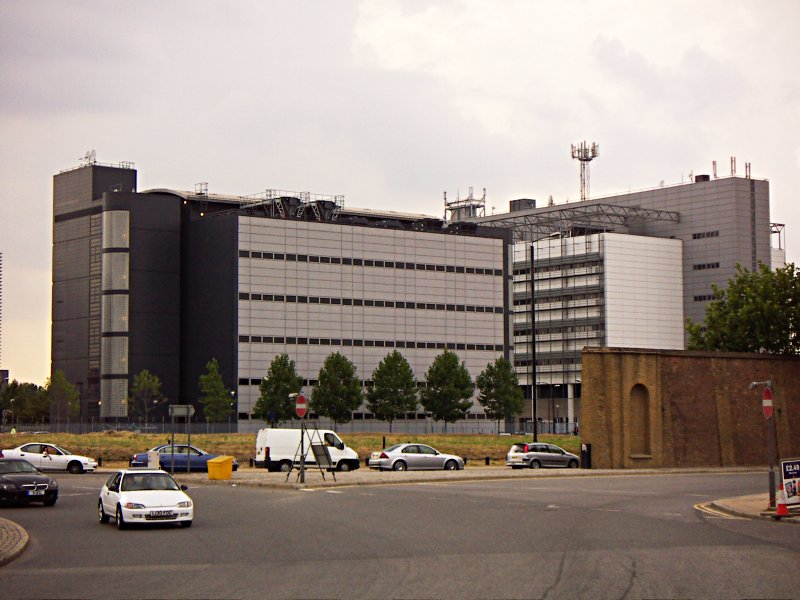
Telehouse Docklands, one of the LIPEX POPs.

Lipex offered services in 6 POPS:

- Star Suite, Telehouse North
- Telehouse North
- Telehouse East
- TeleCityRedbus Harbour Exchange
- TeleCityRedbus Sovereign House
- TeleCityRedbus Meridian Gate

== Other Internet exchange points in London ==
- London Internet Exchange (LINX)
- London Network Access Point (LONAP)
- Packet Exchange
- Redbus Internet Exchange (RBIEX)
- XchangePoint
