= Data Economy =

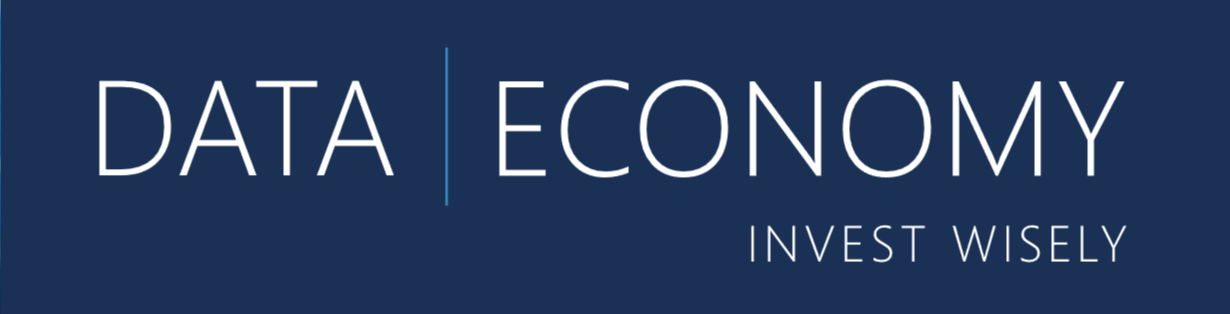
- Data Economy's Invest Wisely Logo adopted in September 2018
- Website type: Technology Business News
- Available in: English
- Headquarters: 8 Bouverie Street, London EC4Y 8AX, England, United Kingdom
- Owners: Broadmedia Communications, part of Euromoney Institutional Investor PLC
- Creators: João Marques Lima (Founder & Editor-in-Chief); Philip Low (Publisher)
- Editor: João Marques Lima
- Website: www.data-economy.com
- Commercial: Yes
- Registration: Optional
- Launched: 14 September 2016; 10 years ago
- ISSN: 2632-4601
- OCLC number: 1090423322

Data Economy is an international technology business news and opinion website, magazine and broadcaster founded in 2016. The media outlet is headquartered in London, UK and focuses on the business strategy and finance and investment within the IT infrastructure space, mainly data centres.

Broadmedia Communications, trading as BroadGroup and established in 2002, and a member company of FTSE 250 firm Euromoney Institutional Investor PLC (LSE: ERM), is registered as Data Economy's publisher. The title is also a member of the Professional Publishers Association (PPA).

== History ==
The Data Economy news website was created in September 2016 following a business dinner in Monaco between publisher and Broadmedia Communications CEO Philip Low and journalist João Marques Lima.

The publication acquired in November 2016, datacentres.com, created in 2005 and whose reporting focused on the development of data centres and cloud infrastructure across the globe. Before the end of the year, Data Economy also launched the Frontline video series, in which it interviews executive officers, technology entrepreneurs and government figures.

Data Economy became part of the Euromoney Institutional Investor PLC portfolio in March 2017, when the organisation acquired Broadmedia Communications. The Daily Mail and General Trust (LSE: DMGT) is the majority shareholder of Euromoney Institutional Investor PLC with 49% of the company's stake.

The news source released in June 2017 its first print magazine, with production amounting to six editions yearly. Data Economy also runs a special supplement for specific market regions on a monthly basis.

In late 2017, Data Economy launched its Live series of events made of forums and summits targeted at industry executives, especially investors, operational companies, government and regional investment authorities and law firms. Data Economy is also the official global media partner of all Broadmedia Communications events including the Datacloud and Edge Congress series.

In September 2018, the group revamped its slogan, changing from "Defining data centres and cloud 24/7" to "Invest Wisely", matching its finance and investment focused coverage of the IT infrastructure sector.

== Readership and content ==
Data Economy is aimed at a worldwide elite of senior IT and operations professionals in the data centre, cloud and data spaces. The publication also targets executives in the finance and investment spectrum and legal ecosphere.

The publication's content is showcased across its website for soft and hard news stories and opinion, its magazine for in depth interviews and analysis, and its broadcasting services through video interviews and live streaming from Data Economy, Datacloud and Edge Congress editions worldwide.

=== Magazine ===
Data Economy launched its first print edition in Monaco 2017 during Datacloud Europe, attended by 1,800 delegates that year. Data Economy produces six editions a year with unveilings at events in Europe, APAC, North America and Africa along with regional Data Economy Brief magazines. The magazines are also distributed globally and hosted online.

The magazine is usually 92 pages long and features content with C-Level executive and analysis. Some of the personalities interviewed for the magazine include the Prime Minister of Luxembourg Xavier Bettel, Lenovo's chairman and CEO Yang Yuanqing, and NetApp's George Kurian.

The magazine is laid out into the following sections: Global Leadership Talks, Finance and Investment Watch, Technology Business Talks and a People & Lifestyle Watch. Each issue also contains a special focus such as the Data Economy EMEA 50, America's 50, APAC 50, Women 50, Power 200 or 30 Under 30, which lists the industry's top minds in data centre, cloud and edge in the given region or topic.

=== Biannual Lists ===
In 2017, Data Economy launched the "EMEA 50", a regional ranking of the data centre and cloud sector's top 50 influencers. The list is composed biannually and realised in the publication's June magazine, during the Datacloud Global Congress in Monaco. In the first edition, English industry entrepreneur, businessman, author and philanthropist Michael Tobin OBE ranked as EMEA's most influential leader.

Following the launch of the "EMEA 50", Data Economy also initiated other rankings including 'The 30 Under 30', showcasing the young people who are leading the data centre, cloud and data industries, the world's top 25 finance and investment movers and shakers in data centres and cloud, and the world's first top 50 edge computing influencers.

=== Frontline ===
Launched at the same time as when the publication was founded, Data Economy Frontline is a series of videos interviews in which industry leaders are questioned about their business and market trends. Some of the interviewees include Google's VP of data centres, Equinix's CEO, Digital Realty's CEO and others.

== Data Economy Live ==
In November 2017, the first Data Economy Live event was held in London, focusing on edge computing. Other events include the Data Economy Summit in June 2019 and hosted at the Grimaldi Forum in Monaco.

The event focused on the global investment, finance and M&A activity across the global IT infrastructure space. The event, a spin-off of Broadmedia Communications' 11-year running Finance and Investment Forum, gathers the strategic and financial leadership, private equity specialists, financiers, industry investors, REITs, professional transactional and advisory firms, and government.

The second Data Economy Finvest Global Summit & Awards will take place in Zürich, Switzerland, in February 2020.

=== Awards ===
The Data Economy Awards are a yearly accolade to celebrate the top talent within the finance and investment space in the data centre and cloud sectors.

The show is hosted together with the Data Economy Summit and consists of 12 industry awards, including: CFO of the Year Award, Edge Investment Award, Edge-Tech Startup Award, Editor's Choice Award, Emerging Markets Award, Global Financial Leader Award, Investor of the Year Award, Law Firm of the Year Award, Lifetime Financial Achievement Award, M&A of the Year Award, Private Equity Fund Award, TMT Global Award.

== See also ==
- Euromoney Institutional Investor PLC
- Daily Mail and General Trust
