= Climate Neutral Data Centre Pact =

Industry climate neutrality pledge

The Climate Neutral Data Centre Pact (CNDCP) is a pledge of industry players and trade association of cloud infrastructure services and data centres in Europe to achieve climate neutrality by 2030. It is supported by the European Commission and Frans Timmermans, Executive Vice-President of the European Commission for the European Green Deal.

The European Green Deal expects Europe to be climate neutral by 2050.

The Climate Neutral Data Centre Pact pledge addresses 5 areas:

1. Prove energy efficiency with measurable targets
2. Purchase 100% carbon-free energy
3. Water conservation
4. Reuse, repair and recycle servers
5. Look for ways to recycle heat.

Metrics to be achieved by 2025 and 2030 will have to be certified by an independent auditor, except for SMEs.

One of the originality of the pledge is that if a data centre operator signatory of the pledge does not meet the expected metrics, the company would be expelled by all trade association signatories of the Pact.

A first Board of Directors of the Pact was appointed for a 2 year term 24 February 2021. it is composed by 6 members. First directors are Alban Schmutz (OVHcloud representing CISPE and co-founder of the Pact), Michael Winterson (Equinix representing EUDCA co-founder of the Pact), Stijn Grove (Dutch Data Centre Association), Emma Fryer (TechUK), Lex Coors (Interxion) and Fabrizio Garrone (Aruba).

The Pact has been referenced by the European Commission as "instrumental in setting up the European Green Digital Coalition"

== Background ==
Twenty-five operators and seventeen trade associations announced the pact on 21 January 2021. The move was pre-emptive. Contemporary reporting set it against the European Green Deal: the European Commission had let it be known that data centres would face sustainability requirements, and the industry preferred a pledge of its own making to rules written for it. By the time of the launch, officials had already signalled a softer line. Three of the largest US operators of data centres in Europe (Apple, Microsoft and Facebook) did not sign.

== Engagement of signatories (metrics) ==
By signing the Pact, Data Centre Operators agree to have all their data centres operated within the European Union fulfilling several metrics. All data centre larger than 50KW of maximum IT power are considered in the perimeter of the Pact to consider. If one of the data centres of an operator fails to meet the thresholds, a 60 days period is granted to propose a remediation plan to the board of directors of the Pact, and this plan must be executed within 6 months. If failing to meet the thresholds, the operator would be expelled from the Pact.

Metrics to achieve are the following:

- By January 1, 2025 new data centres operating at full capacity in cool climates will meet an annual PUE target of 1.3, and 1.4 for new data centres operating at full capacity in warm climates. Existing data centres will achieve these same targets by January 1, 2030.
- Data centre electricity demand will be matched by 75% renewable energy or hourly carbon-free energy by December 31, 2025 and 100% by December 31, 2030.
- Data centres will assess for reuse, repair, or recycling 100% of their used server equipment, and operators will increase the quantity of server materials repaired or reused and will create a target percentage for repair and reuse by 2025.
- Interconnection with district heat systems to reuse heat of data centres will be envisaged where practical, environmentally sound and cost effective.

Some metrics remains undefined like targets on water conservation, but the pledge give the signatories until end 2021 to define and agree a metric with the European Commission.

== Verification ==
External verification came only in the pact's second year. In December 2022 an audit framework was published, drawn up with the certification company Bureau Veritas, so that independent auditors could check what signatories claimed and answer the scepticism that attaches to environmental commitments in the sector. It applied from 2023 to every signatory (104 of them by then). Its scope follows the pledge itself: energy efficiency, renewable electricity, water, equipment reuse, waste heat. The framework is aligned with the EU Taxonomy Regulation, and it recognises equivalent CEN-CENELEC, ISO/IEC, ASHRAE and ANSI/ISA standards, so that an operator already certified need not certify twice.

== Signatories ==
Cloud infrastructure providers and Data centre signatories include: 3DS Outscale (Dassault Systèmes), Altuhost, Aruba, Atos, AWS (Amazon Web Services), CyrusOne, Data4, DigiPlex, Digital Realty & Interxion, Equinix, FlameNetworks, Gigas, Google, Ikoula, Ilger, Infloclip, Intel Corporation, Irideos, ITnet, LCL, Leaseweb, next layer, NTT, OVHcloud, Register, Scaleway, and Seeweb.

In addition, the 17 trade associations signed up at the launch are: Association of Cloud Infrastructure Services Providers Europe (CISPE), the European Data Centre Association (EUDCA), Cloud28+, Cloud Community Poland, Danish Cloud Community, Datacentre Industrien, Data Centre Alliance, Dutch Data Centre Association, Dutch Hosting Providers Association, Eco - Alliance for strengthening digital infrastructures in Germany, EuroCloud Croatia, EuroCloud France, France Datacenter, Host in Scotland, IKT-Norge, ISPConnect, and TechUK. In June 2021, signatories include 54 providers and 23 trade associations, including providers like IBM or T-Systems as well as the de:German Datacenter Association.

== Relationship to European Union law ==
The pact binds no one in law; it is a self-regulatory initiative. Binding rules came afterwards. Directive (EU) 2023/1791 of 13 September 2023 on energy efficiency requires data centres to report on their energy performance and sustainability, and Commission Delegated Regulation (EU) 2024/1364 of 14 March 2024 set out the first phase of a common Union rating scheme for data centres.

The threshold is 500 kW of installed information technology power. Above it, an operator reports to a European database. What must be reported is set out in Annex VII to the directive: energy consumption, power utilisation, temperature set points, waste heat utilisation, water usage and the share of renewable energy (much the same ground the pact had covered voluntarily three years earlier). First returns fell due on 15 September 2024, and annually from 15 May 2025.
