= Company limited by guarantee =

Type of corporation

A company limited by guarantee (CLG) is a type of company where the liability of members in the event the company is wound up is limited to a (typically very small) amount listed in the company's articles or constitution. Most have no share capital, although rare exceptions exist.

The form originated in the United Kingdom, and now exists under the company law of Australia, Bermuda, Gibraltar, Hong Kong, the Gambia, Ireland, India, and the Canadian provinces of Alberta and Nova Scotia. It previously existed in New Zealand.

It is used primarily but not exclusively by non-profit organisations (including charities) that require legal personality. Other uses include mutual insurance companies and quasi-governmental bodies.

== Characteristics ==
In the UK, a company limited by guarantee can distribute its profits to its members, if allowed by its articles of association. However, in Australia this is not allowed.

In many countries, a company limited by guarantee must include the suffix Limited in its name, as private companies limited by shares must.

In the United Kingdom, until December 1980 in England, Wales and Scotland, and until July 1983 in Northern Ireland, it was possible to form a company limited by guarantee with a share capital, although the number of these companies remaining is very small.

== Not-for-profit uses ==
Some uses of companies limited by guarantee include clubs and membership organisations, including students' unions, residential property management companies, sports associations, such as the PGA European Tour, co-operatives, other social enterprise, non-governmental organizations and charities (especially larger charities, such as Oxfam), and at least two political parties (the UK Independence Party, and Your Party).

The form is also often used by organisations with some kind of national coordinating function. Examples in the UK include the domain name registry Nominet UK, England and Wales Cricket Board and IXPs LINX (London Internet Exchange) and LONAP (London Access Point). Examples elsewhere include Cricket Australia and the World Wide Fund for Nature Hong Kong.

In the UK, some quasi-governmental organisations are incorporated as companies limited by guarantee, a government department or minister having ultimate control. The Financial Conduct Authority and Network Rail (the railway infrastructure provider) are examples.

== Commercial enterprises ==
One of the largest companies limited by guarantee is Bupa, the healthcare company, which has 32 million customers in more than 190 countries and which employs more than 84,000 people around the world.

A number of professional services providers are structured as private companies limited by guarantee in which the members that provide client-facing services are the individual constituent firms using a common brand. The company limited by guarantee typically does not itself provide client-facing services. The Big Four accountancy firms (Deloitte, Ernst & Young, KPMG, and PriceWaterhouseCoopers) are each organized using this structure.

Some law firms also use this structure to establish an internationally branded presence. For example, the Anglo-Canadian law firm of Gowling WLG, formed in 2016, is structured as an English private company limited by guarantee (named Gowling WLG International Limited), in which the two limited liability partnerships of Gowling WLG (Canada) LLP and Gowling WLG (UK) LLP are members and provide legal services; the structure is similar to the Swiss Verein structure used by several other major international law firms. In another example, the Anglo-American law firm of Womble Bond Dickinson is similarly structured, with two limited liability partnerships of Womble Bond Dickinson (UK) LLP and Womble Bond Dickinson (US) LLP being the members and providing client-facing services.
