= Michael Tobin =

Michael Tobin may refer to:

- Michael Tobin (politician) (1835–1908), Irish-born merchant and politician in Newfoundland
- Michael Tobin (entrepreneur) (born 1964), English industry entrepreneur
