= DFTS =

DFTS may refer to:

- Durand Football Tournament Society
- Defence Fixed Telecommunications Service
- Devil facial tumours
- Discrete Fourier transforms

== See also ==
- DFT (disambiguation)
