= London Internet Exchange =

Internet exchange point in London

Coordinates: 51.511453°N 0.003418°W

- Full name: London Internet Exchange
- Abbreviation: LINX
- Founded: 1994
- Location: London, England
- Website: www.linx.net
- Members: 988 as of May 2021
- Ports: 1,730 as of August 2020
- Peak: 11.862 Tbps as of January 2026

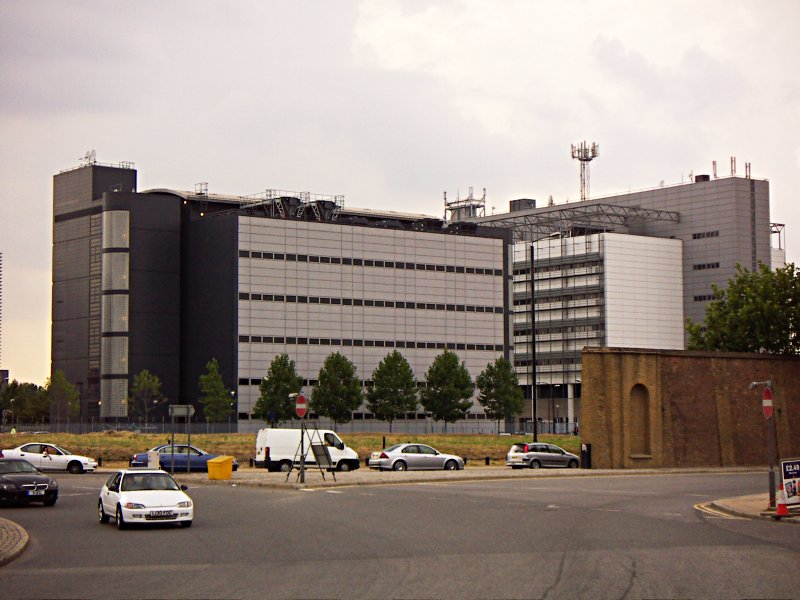
Telehouse Docklands, home of the London Internet Exchange since 1994.

The London Internet Exchange (LINX) is an Internet exchange point (IXP) providing peering to over 950 different autonomous systems (ASNs). Established in 1994 in London, LINX operates IXPs in London, Manchester, Scotland, and Wales in the United Kingdom, as well as in Northern Virginia, United States.

Founded by a consortium of Internet Service Providers (ISPs) and educational networks, LINX is a founding member of Euro-IX, a Europe-wide alliance of Internet exchanges. It is one of the largest neutral IXPs in Europe by average throughput.

LINX functions as a non-profit organization, structured as a company limited by guarantee. Membership involves signing a memorandum of understanding, with each member collectively owning the company. All members hold a single vote at Annual General Meetings (AGMs) and Extraordinary General Meetings (EGMs) on issues related to finances, the constitution, and the scope of LINX activities. The members periodically elect the non-executive board of directors and convene at regular meetings to discuss technical, corporate governance, and regulatory matters. LINX operates under a mandate to avoid direct competition with its members.

== History ==
In November 1994, using a donated piece of equipment no bigger than a video recorder and without any written contracts, five UK-based Internet service providers (ISPs) linked their networks to exchange data and avoid paying high transatlantic bandwidth costs.

LINX effectively began when two ISPs (PIPEX and UK Net) linked their networks via a 64-kilobit serial link to save the cost and time delay involved in routing data across the Atlantic to US Internet exchanges.

When Demon Internet, UKERNA – the UK academic network – and other ISPs showed interest in establishing similar serial links, Keith Mitchell, then chief technical officer of PIPEX, initiated a meeting with BT to discuss the creation of a London-based Internet exchange.

PIPEX provided the LINX founders with a Cisco Catalyst 1200 switch with eight 10-megabit ports. Rack space was leased at a then virtually empty data center operated by Telehouse International Corporation of Europe Ltd at Coriander Avenue in London's Dockland.

Switching the first data through the Telehouse hub was accomplished by primarily technical specialists who were unconcerned about the formalities of legal contracts. However, while PIPEX continued to provide administrative and technical oversight, the need for a formal constitution was eventually recognized.

The solution was to form a company limited by guarantee. Lawyers produced a draft memorandum and constitution which was extensively modified by members. The company was formed in 1995, and a board of five non-executive directors was elected, with Keith Mitchell as the initial chairman.

=== Not for profit organization ===
From the beginning, it was agreed that LINX would be a non-profit organization run for the benefit of members and governed collectively through regular member meetings, a practice which continues to this day.

While PIPEX continued to provide administrative oversight – charged at cost to LINX – member meetings were held every two months (now every three months) to decide strategic direction. Eventually, it was accepted that the purely co-operative system of operation at LINX was becoming overly demanding. Then, in late 1996, Keith Mitchell accepted the role of full-time chairman, working with a personal assistant from offices in Peterborough.

In the summer of 1996, LINX became the first Internet exchange in the world to deploy a 100-megabit switch – a Cisco Catalyst 5000. In January 1999, it pioneered the implementation of a Metropolitan Area Network (MAN) running over gigabit Ethernet connections.

As the Internet grew in popularity, legislators and law enforcement agencies began to call for its regulation. LINX increasingly found itself taking on non-core activities, such as providing expert advice on behalf of its members (and, therefore, the whole industry) to a wide range of official agencies.

In 1999, LINX appointed its first full-time regulation officer in Roland Perry to advise organizations such as the Home Office Internet Task Force, the National Hi-Tech Crime Unit, the Department of Trade and Industry and relevant departments of the EU Commission. In 2003, Roland was succeeded by Malcolm Hutty when Roland left to form his own advisory group.

LINX also actively and financially supports the Internet Watch Foundation which, since 1996, has worked to eradicate child abuse images from the UK Internet. Initial funding from LINX was instrumental in enabling the IWF to launch and the decision to create the IWF and define its charter was taken at a LINX member meeting in Heathrow.

=== LINX in the twenty-first century ===
2000 – A training manager was appointed to introduce an accredited training program for Internet engineers and technicians.

2001 – LINX amended its corporate structure to make the post of chairman non-executive and appointed its first chief executive officer, John Souter, previously UK managing director of German-owned Varetis Communications.

2002 – LINX was the first exchange to introduce 10G Ethernet operation, using equipment from Foundry Networks – in fact, the second of their worldwide customers to deploy their technology.

2003 – This year saw the launch of the 'LINX from Anywhere' service, a facility that permits smaller ISPs to piggyback on the networks of existing members to obtain a secure, virtual presence on the LINX exchange without incurring the manpower and Rackspace costs of having their own installation in London.

2004 – LINX considerably expanded its footprint, with four new points of presence (Pop's) – all in the Docklands area of London.

2005 – LINX members voted to make public affairs one of the company's "core functions", placing it on an equal footing with peering and interconnection.

2006 – LINX membership reached 200.

2008 – LINX expanded again opening three new PoPs, this time adding considerably to the geographical diversity by doing so in the City of London, North Acton and Slough. It also heralded new relationships with data centre operators, with the addition of Interxion and Equinix (to the pre-existing ones of Telehouse and Telecity).

2011 – The LINX primary LAN was redesigned to a VPLS-based infrastructure with a new vendor, Juniper Networks.

2012 – The Connection reseller Programme launched. Also this year LINX became the first Internet exchange in the world to install a Juniper PTX5000 in a live network and the exchange opened its first site outside London in Manchester (IX Manchester).

2013 – Two additional local exchanges, IX Scotland in Edinburgh and LINX NOVA in North Virginia, USA, were launched. They were the exchange's first sites outside England.

2014 – Another local exchange, IX Cardiff in Wales, was launched.

2016 – Sees the introduction of new hardware and a restructuring of LON2 with hardware from EdgeCore Networks

2017 – Following the passage of the Investigatory Powers Act, a new constitution was proposed which would ban directors from reporting the installation of surveillance equipment to members. This caused dissension among members, many of which are non-UK based ISPs operating from countries where mass surveillance is, like in the UK, not legal. This interpretation of the constitutional change was disputed on the official LINX website. Voting on the constitutional revision took place during a hastily called Extraordinary General Meeting (EGM) on 21 February; although a majority supported the change the number attending was too small for the motion to be carried.

2021 – LINX reported a record level of UK Traffic at 6.05 Tbit/s.

2022 – LINX joined the long list of organizations supporting Ukraine by disconnecting Russian services from its networks.

== Technology ==
In London, LINX operates two physically separate networks, or switching platforms, on different architectures using equipment from different manufacturers (Extreme Networks and Juniper Networks). These networks are deployed over ten locations, each connected by multiple 100 Gigabit Ethernet or 10 Gigabit Ethernet connections over fibre networks.

The LINX Engineering team restructured its secondary LAN in London, LON2, in 2018 using software and hardware from two different suppliers.

LINX data center facilities are found at sixteen locations throughout London, including:

- Telehouse North
- Telehouse North 2
- Telehouse East
- Telehouse West
- Equinix Harbour Exchange (ex. TeleCity)
- Digital Realty, Bonnington House, Millharbour (ex. TeleCity)
- Digital Realty, Sovereign House, Marsh Wall (ex. TeleCity)
- Equinix Powergate, Acton
- Equinix, Slough
- Interxion London City
- Virtus, Hayes (Transmission PoP)
- Colt Data Centre, London West (Transmission PoP)

Connecting is also possible from remote locations via the 'LINX from Anywhere' scheme via a range of layer 2 service/MPLS carriers.

Redundancy of the network is managed using rapid-failover protection mechanisms such a VPLS service over an MPLS core (MPLS/VPLS) from Juniper and Extreme's Ethernet Automatic Protection System (EAPS). These restore connectivity within tenths of a second in the event of the loss of a network segment.

In addition to the main peering infrastructure, LINX provides managed private interconnections (via Single Mode Fibre) between LINX members, and works with a number of fibre carriers to provide rapid connection between LINX members for private circuits. These PI circuits may be used for any purpose, but are mainly intended for Private Peering arrangements between members. Private Peering is sometimes more appropriate for managing large flows of traffic between ISPs and/or Content Providers.

Telehouse hosts the vast majority of internet peering traffic from LINX.

== Public affairs ==
One of LINX's core functions is to represent its members in matters of public policy. LINX's Public Affairs department works to obtain advance warning of public policy developments that could affect LINX members, to inform members about important policy developments at a time when it is still possible to influence them, and to educate, inform and influence regulators and legislators.

At the UK level, LINX liaises directly with policymakers on matters such as content regulation, telecoms regulation, privacy and data protection, e-mail spam, online fraud/phishing, law enforcement, counter-terrorism, and any other topics that affect LINX members.

At the European level, LINX is an active member of Euro ISPA and works with Euro ISPA's other national associations to influence European policy.

LINX also works actively with partner organizations such as the Internet Watch Foundation (IWF) and the Internet Society (ISOC). LINX was instrumental in the creation of the Internet Watch Foundation, the UK hotline for reporting and removing child sexual abuse material from the Internet, and continues to advise the IWF as a member of its Funding Council.

As a mutual, membership-based organization, all of LINX's public affairs activity is informed and guided by extensive and ongoing consultation with LINX members.

== Local exchanges ==
=== LINX Manchester ===
Launched in April 2012 IX Manchester, now known as LINX Manchester was initially a single-site platform based on a stand-alone Brocade BigIron RX-16 switch, repurposed from the primary LAN in London. A new design extends the network to two new sites – M247's Ice Colo & Joule House and brings in completely new hardware from Extreme Networks.

The new network will be configured as an EAPS protected ring, topology currently used for the secondary LINX LAN in London. All sites will use a Summit X670v switch, capable of connecting 48x10 Gb member ports. Telecity Williams will also have a smaller Summit X460 switch for terminating slower ports.

The links between sites will be provisioned on a dark fibre provided by NTL and lit by LINX with the use of SFP+ DWDM transceivers and passive DWDM MUX units. Initial ISL capacity will be configured at 20 Gbit/s but easily upgradeable to 80 Gbit/s if required.

=== LINX Scotland ===
Located in Pulsant's South Gyle data center in Edinburgh (formerly Scolocate), IX Scotland, now known as LINX Scotland, was officially launched in November 2013. The site will use the latest hardware from Extreme Networks enabling all the advanced features expected from a modern exchange.

=== LINX Wales ===
Located in BT's Stadium House data center in Cardiff. IX Cardiff, then LINX Cardiff, now known as LINX Wales was officially launched on 15 October 2014 in an effort to decentralize UK internet traffic.

As of July 2018, LINX Wales has a typical peak of 0.9976 Gbit/s of network traffic with a maximum peak of 1.03 Gbit/s as of 1 December 2017.

=== LINX NOVA ===
Following discussions with the US network community, and its own members, LINX decided to launch an open peering exchange in North America in late 2013. Formally to be known as LINX NoVA, the exchange will be closely aligned with, and endorsed by, the newly formed Open-IX, using systems and processes that have proved successful in Europe and the wider world for nearly 20 years.

Based in the North Virginia/Washington DC area, LINX NoVA initially spanned three data centers – Evo Switch in Manassas, Digital Realty in Ashburn and Coresite in Reston – and will be connected using dark fibre lit by LINX. An agreement for a fourth Colo site, also in Ashburn, is expected shortly.

The LINX NOVA exchange will use MX960 router equipment from Juniper Networks capable of delivering 100G member ports from launch with the three PoPs all connected by diverse dark fibre lit by LINX.

LINX NoVA will be developed in the same way as the LINX primary LAN in London (VPLS, separated core and edge, etc.) but as a stand-alone site not requiring a connection to the LANs operated in the London, UK.

== Other activities ==
LINX also carries on a number of non-core activities (NCAPs) from time to time, for example the LINX Accredited Internet Technician (LAIT) training Program.

Other services provided include a time service using atomic clocks, as well as hosting for other "Good of the Internet" services including various Internet statistics projects, numerous secondary name servers for various ccTLD domains, and instances of the F, K and I root nameservers.

Latest news for 2018/19 sees LINX launch an IXP partner relationship with Japan IX allowing customers to connect to LINX in London and also LINX and Saudi Telecom Company (STC), on 7 December 2018 marked the start of JED-IX driven by LINX, an Internet exchange in Jeddah (JED-IX), Kingdom of Saudi Arabia (KSA).

== See also ==
- List of Internet exchange points
- Internet network operators' group

Some other Internet exchange points in London:

- London Internet Providers Exchange (LIPEX)
- London Network Access Point (LONAP)
- Packet Exchange (Formerly XchangePoint)

LINX hosts a number of meetings where network operators can exchange information: see Internet network operators' group for a list of other organizations holding similar meetings.
