= Aruba S.p.A. =

Italian domain registrar and Web hosting company

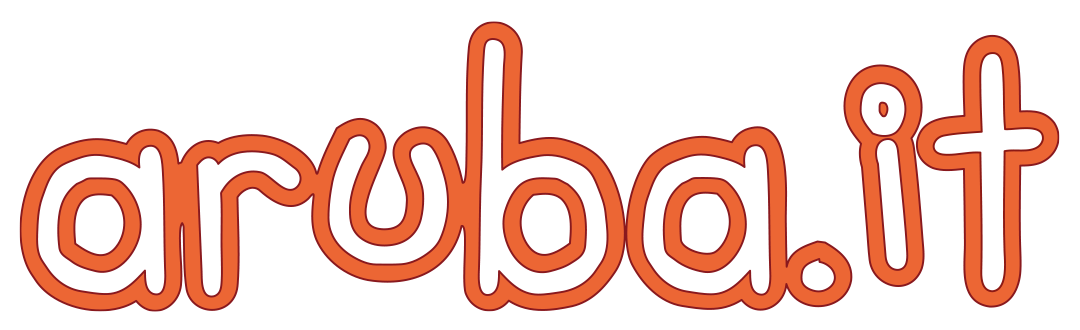
- Type: Joint-stock company (S.p.A.)
- Industry: Information technology
- Founded: 1994 in Florence, Italy
- Headquarters: Italy
- Key people: Stefano Cecconi (CEO)
- Products: Hosting; Domain registration; Cloud computing; Colocation; Certified email (PEC); Digital signature; Dedicated servers and housing; Digital archiving; SPID; Electronic invoicing; Online marketing services; Connectivity; Ultra-broadband; Fiber; SSL certificates
- Revenue: €300 million (2024)
- Number of employees: 900 (2021)
- Website: www.aruba.it/en/

Aruba S.p.A. is an Italian company that provides data center, web hosting, email, and domain name registration services. The company also offers internet connectivity, housing, dedicated servers, virtual private servers, digital archiving, certified email (PEC), digital signatures, and SPID authentication services. Additionally, Aruba provides private, public, and public administration (PA) cloud computing services. Aruba is a member of the Italian Internet Provider Association (AIIP) and a founding member of both the Associazione Hoster e Registrars (AHR) and the Cloud Infrastructure Services Providers in Europe (CISPE). It also serves as the official registry for the .cloud domain extension.

== History ==
Founded in Florence in 1994 as Technorail S.r.l., the company initially operated under the Technet.it brand. In April 2000, this brand was replaced by Aruba.it, which introduced a free dial-up internet service followed by domain registration and web hosting services. In 2003, the company opened a webfarm in Arezzo, a data center housing its web servers. The following year, after transitioning from a limited liability company (S.r.l.) to a joint-stock company (S.p.A.), it officially changed its name to Aruba S.p.A.

In 2005, the company expanded its operations into the Czech Republic and Slovakia through Forpsi.com, and subsequently established a presence in Hungary.

In 2006, Aruba PEC S.p.A. was established. The subsidiary became a certified manager accredited by the National Center for Informatics in Public Administration (CNIPA) and was listed in the public register of Certified Email (PEC) providers. Aruba PEC also functions as a Certification Authority authorized by CNIPA to issue digital signatures.

In 2008, the company launched Aruba Business and Aruba Media Marketing, a division dedicated to online advertising and web marketing. In March 2009, Aruba acquired 100% Actalis S.p.A., a PEC provider and digital signature Certification Authority.

On April 29, 2011, a fire broke out at Aruba's data center in Arezzo, causing an outage that took thousands of websites offline. The fire was contained within the uninterruptible power supply (UPS) room, leaving the servers and data rooms undamaged. This followed a downtime incident on October 6, 2010, which was traced back to human error. Another outage occurred on July 8, 2011, reportedly due to UPS failures.

On September 9, 2011, Aruba launched a cloud computing service across Europe under the Aruba Cloud brand. A Cloud Object Storage service was subsequently added in December 2012. In 2013, the company acquired Homeonline s.r.l., a firm specializing in online public administration and registry procedures. In July 2013, Aruba collaborated with the cybersecurity firm Hacking Team to execute a BGP routing hijack, which restored functionality to one of Hacking Team's remote control products.

On November 11, 2014, Aruba won the auction for the .cloud domain extension, establishing Aruba PEC as the official registry. In early 2015, Homeonline rebranded as Pratiche.it. Later that year, the Italian subsidiaries Alicom, Widestore, and 9Net merged to form Aruba Business s.r.l. In September 2016, Aruba co-founded the Cloud Infrastructure Services Providers in Europe (CISPE), an industry coalition aimed at establishing a data protection code of conduct to ensure that cloud infrastructure clients process and store data strictly within the EU/EEA. That same month, Aruba became an authorized provider for the Italian digital identity system, SPID.

In October 2017, the company inaugurated the Global Cloud Data Center in Ponte San Pietro, near Bergamo. It was Aruba's third proprietary data center in Italy, certified Rating 4 under the ANSI/TIA 942A standard. In February 2019, Aruba launched its Enterprise division. In 2020, Aruba acquired Idroelettrica Veneta S.p.A. for €11 million. Expanding into the telecommunications sector in March 2021, the company began offering ultra-broadband connectivity services in Italy using a fiber-optic network (FTTH - Fiber To The Home). On June 15, 2022, Euronext completed the migration of its core data center and related services from Basildon, UK, to Aruba's Global Cloud Data Center IT3 in Bergamo.

In November 2022, Aruba expanded its Bergamo campus by inaugurating two additional data centers (DC-B and DC-C) along with the Aruba Auditorium.

In July 2023, the company announced the launch of ArubaKube, a cloud-native development spin-off created in partnership with the Polytechnic University of Turin to focus on open-source cloud research and development.

On October 2, 2024, Aruba inaugurated the Hyper Cloud Data Center, a new campus located in the Tecnopolo Tiburtino in Rome. The facility is designed to house five independent data centers with a total IT power capacity of 30 MW.

In 2025, Aruba introduced Faktura Smart, an electronic invoicing solution for the Polish market.

== Products and services ==
Aruba operates across several sectors, including internet connectivity, cloud computing, data center services, and digital trust services. The trust services adhere to the European eIDAS regulatory framework and encompass certified email, remote and standard digital signatures, time stamping, digital archiving, and electronic invoicing. The company's services include:

- Domain name registration
- Web hosting (using Microsoft Windows or Linux servers)
- Dedicated servers and Virtual Private Servers (VPS)
- Housing and colocation
- Certified Email (PEC)
- Digital signatures
- Digital archiving
- SPID digital identity
- Electronic invoicing
- Online public administration procedures
- Data center services (IT infrastructure design and migration, business continuity, disaster recovery, Data Center Extension)
- Enterprise IT solutions across various sectors (banking, insurance, energy, utilities, manufacturing, retail, healthcare, public administration, telecoms, and logistics).

Through a dedicated portal, the company provides cloud computing solutions, including storage, networking, containers, databases, backups, DRaaS, observability, VPS, and bare-metal servers available in public, private, and hybrid cloud models.

== Technical infrastructure ==
Aruba and its affiliated companies deliver services through a network of seven proprietary data centers. Two are located in Arezzo, while the Global Cloud Data Center campus in Ponte San Pietro (near Bergamo) houses three active data centers. The Hyper Cloud Data Center campus in Rome currently operates one active facility. These locations serve clients in Italy and Western Europe. An additional facility (DC-CZ1) operates in the Czech Republic to serve Central and Eastern Europe.

The Arezzo campus includes the IT1 and IT2 data centers. The Global Cloud Data Center (IT3) operates as a carrier-neutral facility offering managed connectivity solutions. The Hyper Cloud Data Center (IT4) connects to internet backbones and features interconnections with the company's other national data centers. Aruba’s network also uses partner data centers in Frankfurt, London, Paris, and Warsaw, primarily for cloud service delivery and disaster recovery functions.

=== Energy and cooling systems ===
The Global Cloud Data Center in Ponte San Pietro employs a groundwater-based cooling system that maintains a temperature of approximately 9 °C year-round. This water runs through heat exchangers to cool the server aisles before being returned to the aquifer. The Bergamo campus also features a hydroelectric plant, acquired alongside the former textile factory site where the campus was built.

In July 2026, Aruba acquired three additional hydroelectric plants situated along the Stura di Lanzo river in Piedmont. This brought the company's total number of proprietary hydroelectric facilities to eleven, with a declared annual production capacity exceeding 60 GWh.

== Motorsport sponsorships ==
=== Aruba.it Racing – Ducati ===
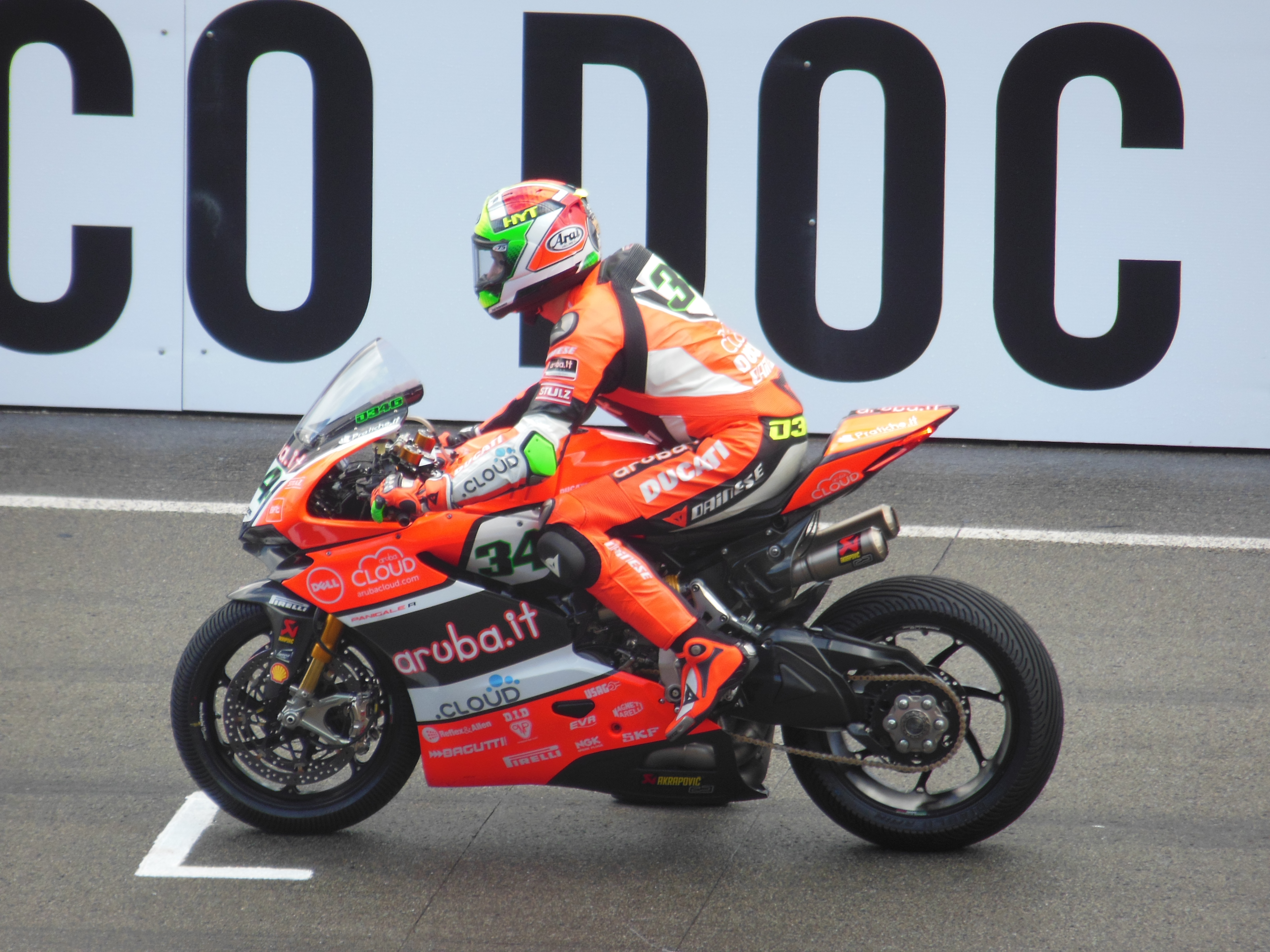
Davide Giugliano at Assen in 2016 on the Aruba.it Racing team's Ducati 1199 Panigale

In 2014, Aruba entered into a partnership with Ducati Corse to compete in the Superbike World Championship. The factory team took on the name "Aruba.it Racing - Ducati".

During the 2015 Superbike World Championship, the team secured 2nd place in the manufacturers' standings, with rider Chaz Davies taking 2nd place in the riders' championship. The following 2016 season saw Davies finish third and teammate Davide Giugliano seventh, securing another 2nd place for Ducati in the manufacturers' championship.

For the 2017 season, Marco Melandri joined Chaz Davies. The two riders concluded the season in 4th and 2nd place respectively, maintaining the team's runner-up status in the constructors' standings. That same year, the brand expanded its involvement by establishing the Aruba.it Racing - Junior team in the European Superstock 1000 championship, which they won with rider Michael Ruben Rinaldi.

The 2018 season retained the Davies-Melandri lineup for the main Superbike championship, while Michael Ruben Rinaldi competed as a wildcard in all European rounds. In 2019, Álvaro Bautista replaced Melandri; Bautista finished second in the championship alongside Davies. The 2020 season saw Scott Redding and Davies finish second and third respectively, missing out on the constructors' title by two points.

In the 2022 season, Álvaro Bautista won his first World Championship and teammate Michael Ruben Rinaldi contributed to a victory in the constructors' championship. The duo remained for the 2023 season, where Bautista successfully defended his world title after winning 15 of the first 16 races.

In 2024, Nicolò Bulega, the reigning WorldSSP champion, took over Rinaldi's seat. Bulega finished the season in second place, with Bautista in third. Their combined results secured another constructors' title for Ducati and earned Aruba Racing the Team World Champion title. The same year, Adrian Huertas won the World Championship in the WorldSSP category for the team.

=== MotoE and motocross ===
In 2024, the Aruba Cloud MotoE Team was formed to compete in the MotoE World Championship. This project is managed directly by the Aruba Cloud division, operating independently from the Superbike team.

In 2025, Aruba Cloud MotoE Team rider Alessandro Zaccone won the MotoE World Championship title following the final race of the season in Portimão.

Additionally, beginning in 2025, Aruba.it became the title sponsor for Ducati's official factory team in the Motocross World Championship, competing under the name Aruba.it – Ducati Factory MX Team.

== See also ==
- Web hosting
