= TelecityGroup =

British data centre provider

Telecity Group plc
- Type: Subsidiary
- Industry: Internet, Data centre, Colocation
- Founded: 1998
- Headquarters: London, United Kingdom
- Key people: John Hughes (Chairman of the board), Michael Tobin (former CEO)
- Services: Data centres
- Revenue: £348.7 million (2014)
- Operating income: £90.0 million (2014)
- Net income: £59.7 million (2014)
- Parent: Equinix
- Website: www.telecitygroup.com

Telecity Group plc (formerly TelecityRedbus and before that Telecity), was a European carrier-neutral data centre and colocation centre provider. It specialised in the design, build and management of datacentre space. It was listed on the London Stock Exchange until it was acquired by Equinix in January 2016.

== History ==
Telecity Group plc was the result of the uniting of three separate companies – TeleCity Limited, Redbus Interhouse Limited and Globix Holdings (UK) Limited. TeleCity Limited was founded by Mike Kelly and Anish Kapoor from Manchester University in April 1998 and opened its first data centre in Manchester. At that time 3i made an investment of £24 million in the Company.

In July 1998, Redbus Interhouse Limited was incorporated, and commenced operations in its first data centre in London Docklands in July 1999. By March 2000, Redbus Interhouse Limited floated on the main market of the London Stock Exchange and in June 2000, TeleCity Limited’s parent company, TeleCity plc floated on the London Stock Exchange.

In September 2005, TeleCity plc was taken private by 3i and Oak Hill and by October of that year Telecity Group plc was incorporated and became the holding company of Telecity plc and its group companies in November 2005. In January 2006 Telecity Group acquired Redbus Interhouse plc, a rival business, resulting in the two business, TeleCity and Redbus, trading under the name of TelecityRedbus. Later in 2006 Telecity Group plc bought the European assets of the US-based Globix Corporation.

Following a rebranding exercise implemented in August 2007, TeleCity, Redbus and Globix (UK) began to trade under the name TelecityGroup. In October Telecity Group plc listed on the main market of the London Stock Exchange.

In August 2010, TelecityGroup acquired Internet Facilitators Limited (IFL), a provider of-carrier neutral data centres in Manchester. In August 2011 TelecityGroup acquired Data Electronics, which operates two carrier-neutral data centres in Dublin, and in September 2011 UK Grid, a carrier-neutral data centre operator in Manchester was acquired.

TelecityGroup has announced it is expanding its data centre capacity across Europe. At the end of 2011 the company had 68 MW of available customer power and this will be increased to 124 MW by 2016. As part of this expansion the first phase of a new 9 MW data centre was opened in Amsterdam (Southeast AMS 5) in early 2012, and on 2 July 2012 Ed Vaizey, UK Minister for Communications, officially opened the first phase of a 21 MW expansion at the company's London Powergate facility.

In August 2012, TelecityGroup acquired Tenue Oy, a provider of carrier-neutral data centres in Helsinki, Finland. In November 2012 TelecityGroup acquired Academica, a data centre and IT services operator, also active in Finland since 1996, giving the enlarged TelecityGroup Finland a total of three data centres and 2MW of operational capacity; 7MW of additional capacity will be opened in two new facilities in due course.

In May 2013, TelecityGroup acquired SadeceHosting, a provider of data centre and hosted services in Istanbul, Turkey and in November 2013, TelecityGroup acquired 3DC, an independent data centre provider in Sofia, Bulgaria.

In August 2014, Telecity’s founder Michael Tobin left the company following reported tensions with the board of directors.

In February 2015, it was announced that Telecity would merge with Interxion, purchasing it in a $2.2 billion deal, thus creating a joint data-center operator, with a combined value of $4.5 billion. According to the two CEOs, a deal promised to deliver around $600 million in synergy savings.

In May 2015, US data company Equinix announced it would be acquiring TelecityGroup for £2.35 billion ($3.6 billion), which would terminate Telecity’s deal with Interxion. Reuters reported that the acquisition of Telecity by Equinix would create the largest data centre company in Europe. On 13 November 2015, the European Commission granted clearance for the Equinix offer to acquire Telecity. As part of this acquisition, the European Commission required divestment of eight of the datacentre sites on competition grounds, and these sites were sold to Digital Realty for $874 million.

In January 2016, Equinix announced that it had completed the Telecity acquisition in a transaction valued at approximately $3.8 billion. The addition of Telecity data centres more than doubled Equinix's capacity in Europe, making the company the region's largest retail colocation provider.

== Operations ==
The company operated 37 data centres, located in several European cities:

- Amsterdam – 6 (Gyroscoopweg, Science Park, Southeast Amsterdam 2 (Zuidoost), Amstel Business Park, Duivendrechtse kade - Southeast Amsterdam 5 - (Zuidoost))
- Dublin – 4 (City West Business Campus, Kilcarbery Park, Northwest Business Park Unit 2, Northwest Business Park Unit 14)
- Frankfurt – 2 (Lyoner Strasse, Gutleutstrasse)
- Helsinki – 5 (Hiomo, Suvilahti, Sinimäki, Viikinmäki, Hansa)
- Istanbul - 1 (SadeceHosting)
- London – 8 (Prospect House - Tottenham Court Road, Oliver’s Yard - Old Street, Powergate - Acton and in Docklands, Sovereign House, Meridian Gate -, Bonnington House, 8&9 Harbour Exchange and 6&7 Harbour Exchange.
- Manchester – 4 (Willams & Kilburn House, Reynolds House, Synergy House, Joule House)
- Milan – 3 (Via Savona, Basiglio, Via Cascia)
- Paris - 3 (Energy Park, Victor Hugo, Condorcet)
- Sofia - 1 (Sofia-1)
- Stockholm - 2 (Stockholm 1- Bromma, Stockholm 2 - Skondal)
- Warsaw - 2 (Warsaw 1(LIM), Warsaw 2)
