= Teraco Data Environments =

Internet infrastructure company

- Type: Private
- Industry: Internet Infrastructure
- Founded: 2008; 18 years ago
- Founders: Tim Parsonson; Lex van Wyk
- Headquarters: Isando, Johannesburg, South Africa
- Number of locations: 7 data centre locations across South Africa
- Area served: Sub-Saharan Africa
- Parent: Digital Realty; (2022–present, 77%)
- Website: https://www.teraco.co.za

Teraco Data Environments is a carrier-, cloud- and vendor-neutral data centre provider founded by Tim Parsonson and Lex van Wyk in 2008. On 1 August 2022, Digital Realty announced that it had completed the purchase of a majority stake in Teraco, previously controlled by Berkshire Partners, Permira and a group of investors.

== Overview ==
As the local telecommunications market began to deregulate, Teraco's founders recognised an opportunity for a truly vendor-neutral data centre offering in South Africa.

Teraco is majority-owned by Digital Realty (NYSE: DLR) and a consortium of private equity investors, including Berkshire Partners LLC and Permira.

== Data centres ==
Teraco built Africa's largest data centre in Johannesburg, South Africa. In 2012, the company created NAPAfrica, a fully funded non-profit neutral Internet eXchange Point (IXP). Teraco has additional data centres in Durban and Cape Town.

== Peering by NAPAfrica ==
Xneelo, South Africa's web hosting company, partnered with this company. Telkom peered with NAPAfrica through its Openserve wholesale and network division in 2016. Clients will be able to use the Microsoft service through this company. The telecom operator, Angola Cables, peered with this company in 2017.

== Accomplishments and funding ==
After completing an Environmental Impact Assessment (EIS), Teraco was granted permission to store 210,000 litres of diesel on site.

- 2011: The company received R158 million in Series C financing.
- 2013: A R200 million medium-term funding facility was provided from Absa's corporate and investment banking division.
- 2014: Teraco was acquired by Permira in first African investment.
- 2015: The company acquired R400 million in funding.
- 2016: Liquid Telecom invested $3.5 million in a new satellite hub.
- 2017: Barclays Africa Group funded R1.2 billion ($90 million) for Teraco Data Environments.
- 2022: Digital Realty acquired a 55% stake in Teraco Data Environments.
- 2026: Digital Realty increased its stake to 77%, having acquired 16% from existing minority shareholders.
