= Globix Corporation =

- Industry: Internet infrastructure and network services
- Founded: 1989
- Founder: Marc Bell
- Successor: RCN Corporation
- Website: globix.com

Globix Corporation is a company that provided internet infrastructure and network services; it went bankrupt following the dot-com bubble, recovered, and was bought by RCN Corporation in 2007.

== History ==
Globix Corporation was founded in 1989 as Bell Technology Group, a value-added reseller of computers; Marc Bell served as CEO from its founding until March 2000.

In the mid-1990s the company expanded into Internet products and services and completed an IPO in January 1996.

By June 1998 the company offered "dedicated Internet access, Web Hosting, Co-location, network and systems integration, interactive media development (including 2-D and 3-D animation) and instructor-led corporate training" and changed its name to Globix Corporation.

During the dot-com bubble, Globix bought an eight-story building in New York City to serve as a data center, which was announced at Internet World 2000 by Bell, who cited "tremendous demand for our managed Internet Data Center services". The company already had nearly 300,000 square feet of data center space, and planned four additional centers. The company completed a $600 million bond offering in 2001 to fund further expansion.

As the dot-com bubble burst, in August 2001 the company hired a new CEO and in January 2002, Globix filed for Chapter 11 bankruptcy; its market capitalization had fallen from almost $2.5 billion in 2000 to $5.87 million. Globix emerged from Chapter 11 bankruptcy in April 2002, with creditors receiving $120 million in notes in exchange for the $600 million in bonds they held. In October 2003 Globix sold its New York City data center to fund operations and retire some of its debt.

In November 2003 Globix acquired Aptegrity Inc., a managed services provider focused on Web-based applications. In July 2004, Globix announced it intended to merge with NEON Communications, Inc., a provider of optical networking to carriers and large companies in the US Northeast and mid-Atlantic, and the deal closed in March 2005. For the fiscal year ending September 30, 2004, Globix reported a net loss of $41.4 million and had $95.8 million in debt.

In late 2005 and 2006 Globix restructured and paid down debt by selling off assets, including its New York city headquarters, a UK subsidiary, and its hosting business, the latter of which it sold to Quality Technology Services.

In February 2007 Globix changed its name to NEON Communications Group, Inc.

In June 2007 RCN Corporation announced it intended to acquire NEON and the deal closed in November 2007.
