= DFT =

DFT may refer to:

== Businesses and organisations ==
- Department for Transport, United Kingdom
- Digital Film Technology, maker of the Spirit DataCine film digitising scanner
- DuPont Fabros Technology, a former US data center company

== Science and technology ==
- Decision field theory, a human cognitive decision-making model
- Devil facial tumour, a symptom of devil facial tumour disease, a cancer affecting Tasmanian devils
- Density functional theory, a computational quantum mechanical modelling method
- Discrete Fourier transform, in mathematics
- Deaerating feed tank, in steam plants that propel ships
- Design for testing or design for testability, an IC design technique

== Other uses ==
- Demand flow technology, a business strategy
- DFT class locomotive, a turbo-charged rebuild of the New Zealand DF class locomotive
