= Alog Datacenters =

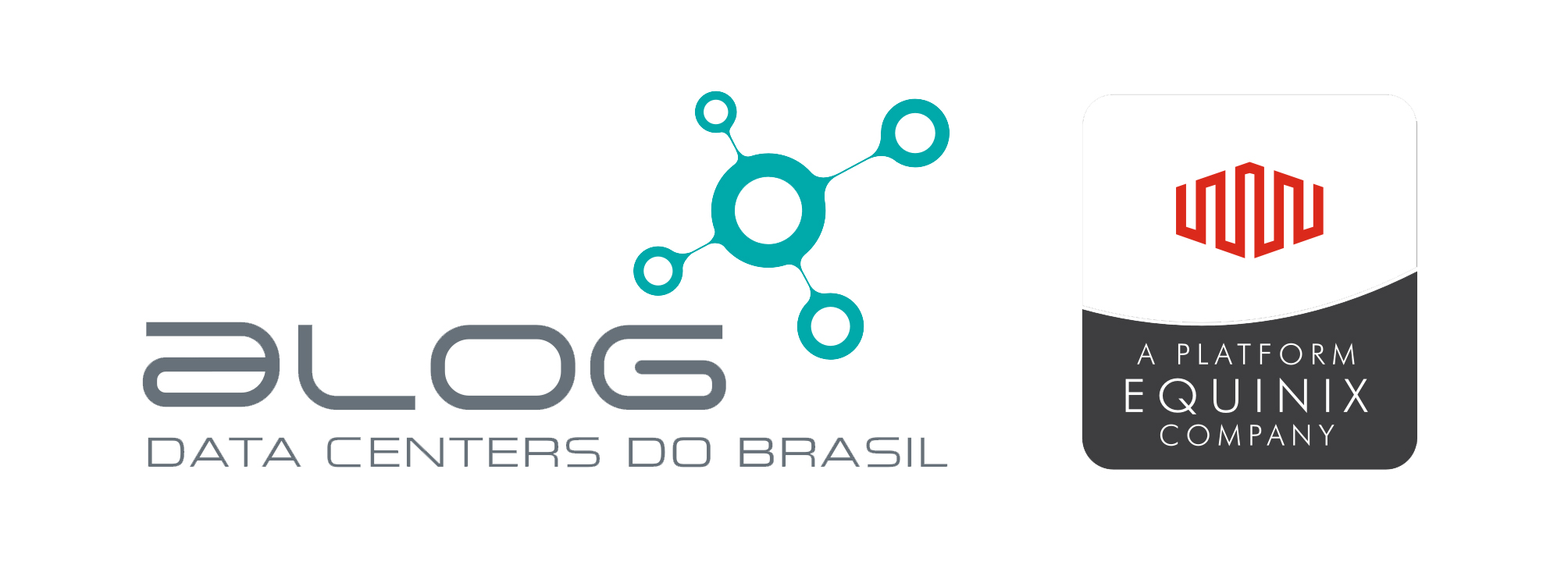
- Type: Private
- Industry: Data centers
- Founded: 2005, São Paulo, Rio de Janeiro, Brazil
- Headquarters: São Paulo, Rio de Janeiro, Brazil
- Area served: Brazil
- Key people: Eduardo Carvalho (president) and Steve Smith (CEO) Equinix
- Owner: Equinix
- Website: www.alog.com.br

Alog is a data center firm that provides infrastructure services in information technology, colocation, hosting management and cloud computing. The firm was founded in 2005 and its head offices are located in Rio de Janeiro and São Paulo, Brazil.

Alog is part of Equinix, the world's largest data center group according to Uptime Institute, a data center certifying firm.

== History ==
Alog Data Centers was established in Rio de Janeiro in 2005. In 2007, the company merged with São Paulo firm .comDomínio and so was created Alog Data Centers do Brasil.

Equinix, an American data center company and Riverwood Capital, a private equity investment fund, bought 90% of Alog's capital in February 2011.

Since 2011, Alog is a Tier III Uptime Institute certified company at the SP2 website. The standard certifies availability of infrastructure, energy and security levels. Since 2013, Alog holds the Furukawa Group Green Seal certification. The certification is part of the Green Technology program to companies that recycle waste of replaced cables.

Datacenter Del Castilho was launched in 2013. It is Alog's largest datacanter located in an area of 15 thousand square meters and also the only one in the state of Rio de Janeiro to hold the Tier III certification. In the same year, Alog became a partner of Microsoft Corporation in order to offer Microsoft's Cloud Computing solutions.

The company has also been elected by the Great Place to Work (GPTW) institute and the Brazilian Association of Human Resources (ABRH-RJ) as one of the best Information technology companies to work for. Also, the firm has been appointed as the best place to work in Rio de Janeiro since 2010.

In 2013, Alog received the Competitive Strategy Innovation & Leadership award from Frost & Sullivan, an international consulting and market intelligence firm in the category of major Brazilian Colocation company.

In the same year, Alog was voted the best provider of infrastructure in Latin America by World Finance magazine and elected by the Gartner Group, a research technology firm, one of the key companies aligned with mobility, cloud and social in the Cool Vendors study.

Alog is a partner of Brazilian Association of the companies of Information technology and Communication (Brasscom) since 2013. The association promotes Brazilian Information technology companies both domestically and abroad.

In July 2014, Equinix acquired another 47 percent of Alog from the company's founders and Riverwood Capital, which resulted in Equinix gaining total ownership of Alog.

== Workscope ==
Alog is a supplier of more than 1.500 companies of medium and large size working within a diverse range of businesses.

Alog's structure is made of four datacenters: two in the state of Rio de Janeiro, one in Botafogo and another in Del Castilho; and two in São Paulo, the first one downtown and the second one in Tamboré.

Eduardo Carvalho is Alog's president in Brazil. Charles Meyers is the global CEO of Equinix.
