= HPE Helion =

Software portfolio for cloud computing

- Industry: Computer software IT services IT consulting
- Founded: May 2014
- Headquarters: Palo Alto, California, United States
- Key people: Kerry Bailey, Bobby Patrick, Mark Interrante, Bill Hilf
- Parent: Hewlett Packard Enterprise

HPE Helion was Hewlett-Packard Enterprise's portfolio of open-source software and integrated systems for enterprise cloud computing. It was announced by HPE Cloud in May 2014. HPE Helion grew from under US$300 million to over US$3 billion by 2016. HP closed the public cloud business on 31 January 2016. HP has hybrid cloud and other offerings but the Helion public cloud offering was shut down.

HPE Helion was based on open-source technology, including OpenStack and Cloud Foundry.

== Products ==
- HPE Helion OpenStack, product based on OpenStack cloud computing project launched in October 2014. The HPE-sponsored cloud services catalogue Cloud28+ exclusively featured software built with HPE Helion OpenStack when it launched in 2014.
- HPE Helion Stackato is a platform as a service (PaaS) based on Cloud Foundry, which HPE acquired in July 2015. Helion Stackato is available for OpenStack, AWS, VMWare and Azure.
- HPE Helion CloudSystem, an integrated Infrastructure-as-a-Service and Platform-as-a-Service offering combining HPE Helion OpenStack and HPE Helion Stackato with HPE Proliant server hardware based on a particular use-case, such as distributed compute or distributed object storage. CloudSystem 10 launched in September 2016.
- HPE Helion Eucalyptus is an Amazon Web Services-compatible platform for building cloud environments, based in the open-source Eucalyptus software, which HPE launched in March 2015. It allows AWS applications to be moved on-premises with no modification to the workload, design patterns, or mindset.
