= .cloud =

Internet top-level domain

cloud
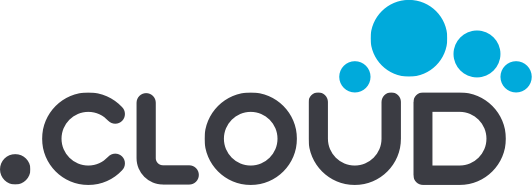
- Introduced: November 13, 2014; 12 years ago
- TLD type: Generic top-level domain
- Status: Active
- Registry: Aruba S.p.A.
- Intended use: Companies involved in cloud computing
- Structure: Registrations at second level permitted
- DNSSEC: yes
- Registry website: .cloud Home Page

.cloud is a generic top-level domain (gTLD) delegated by Internet Corporation for Assigned Names and Numbers (ICANN). It is managed by the Italian company Aruba PEC SpA, a wholly owned subsidiary of the same Aruba S.p.A., one of the largest distributors of Hostings and Providers in Europe.

The back-end services are provided by ARI Registry Services. The proposed application succeeded and was delegated to the DNS root zone on 26 Jun 2015.

The .cloud domain does not have any restriction.

== Specifications ==
There are no limits to the number of .cloud domain names a person can register, and anyone can register one without any restrictions. It is not necessary to have a Cloud service to register a .cloud domain. To register the domain name, the registrant must provide registrant contact information to Aruba, however the registrant may opt in to Whois privacy.

Domain names with the .cloud extension must be between 3 and 63 characters long. Specifically, allowed characters include all letters of the Latin alphabet (a-z), all numeric characters (0-9), and the hyphen (-). However, the hyphen cannot be the first or last character of the domain name.

A .cloud domain can be registered for any number of years, and the domain owner can associate any service offered by Aruba. Alternatively, it is also possible to register a .cloud domain without associating any additional hosting or other services. There are no additional fees or supplements required for the registration of a .cloud domain.

== See also ==
- List of Internet top-level domains
