= Marc Bell (entrepreneur) =

American financier and entrepreneur

Marc H. Bell
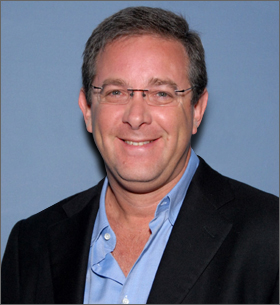
- Born: Brooklyn, New York, US
- Citizenship: American
- Education: Babson College, New York University
- Occupations: Managing Partner, Marc Bell Capital; Founder and CEO, Globix, Chairman and CEO, Terran Orbital
- Board member of: Armour Residential REIT, New York University

Marc Bell is an American financier and entrepreneur. He is the managing partner of Marc Bell Capital, a Miami, Florida-based firm founded in 2002. He is also a producer of plays, musicals and movies.

== Education ==
Bell graduated from Scarsdale High School in the Class of 1985. He later on earned his Bachelor of Science degree in accounting from Babson College and a Master of Science degree in real estate development and investment from New York University.

== Early life and career ==
=== Globix: The Global Internet Exchange (1989-2000) ===
Bell founded the internet data center company that eventually became Globix Corporation in 1989 at the age of 21 and served as its CEO and chairman of the board through the company's IPO in 1996. Bell sold part of his position in Globix in March, 2000 for $120 million and stepped down as CEO. Later the dot-com bubble occurred; the company crashed along with the stock market in 2001 as its main internet data centers were located in lower Manhattan. Its market capitalization fell from almost $2.4 billion in 1999 to $5.87 million in 2002 when it went through Chapter 11 bankruptcy due to its inability to recover from the September 11, 2001 attack.

=== Publishing (2004-2014) ===
In 2004, Bell and a partner acquired Penthouse magazine for $52 million as a creditor in a bankruptcy through a vehicle they called "Penthouse Media Group", and in 2007 Penthouse Media Group acquired Various, which included networking site AdultFriendFinder.com for $500 million and Bell and his partner renamed the company Friend Finder Networks. FriendFinder Networks had over 484 million registered users in over 200 countries across its 44,000 websites, including Amigos.com, BigChurch.com, and SeniorFriendFinder.com. In 2010 Bell, through Friend Finder Networks, tried to acquire Playboy Enterprises but was rebuffed after a $210 million bid.

=== Hospitality (2009-2017) ===
Through his company Marc Bell Capital, Bell is an investor and partner in restaurants and nightclubs in New York City in ventures such as Country, Artichoke Pizza, Avenue, Lavo, and Catch in NYC.

=== Broadway (2006-Present) ===
Bell has produced musicals and plays such as Jersey Boys, Rock of Ages, The Wedding Singer, August: Osage County, and A Catered Affair. His production Jersey Boys won a Tony Award for Best Musical in 2006, and August: Osage County won Best Play in 2008. Jersey Boys was the eighth highest-grossing show in the history of Broadway with worldwide revenue of $1,644,848,098. Bell also won a Tony Award for Best Play in 2024 for Stereophonic (play) the most nominated play in the history of Broadway with 13 Tony nominations.

=== Enterprise Acquisition Corp (2007-Present) ===
In 2007, Bell filed a SPAC with the SEC for $250 million called Enterprise Acquisition Corp. In 2009 it merged with Armour Residential REIT. In 2026 Armour was worth $2.1 billion with over $20 billion of assets.

=== Terran Orbital (2013-2024) ===
He is a co-founder and the chief executive officer of Terran Orbital, a manufacturer of small satellites. Terran Orbital received $100 million investment from Lockheed Martin. Terran was named one of Time Magazine's Time100 Most Influential Companies 2023. Terran added a satellite to the permanent display of the Smithsonian Air and Space Museum in March 2023

On August 15, 2024, Bell agreed to sell Terran Orbital to Lockheed Martin for $450 million, and a 6-million-dollar bonus for himself. At the end of October 2024, Lockheed Martin completed its acquisition of Terran Orbital, becoming the sole owner of the company. Terran Orbital continues its existence as part of Lockheed Martin (rebranded as “Terran Orbital, a Lockheed Martin Company”) and continues to produce smallsats.

== Personal ==
Marc Bell lives in Miami Beach, FL Bell put his house in Boca Raton on the market for $35 million; it included a room modeled after the bridge of the Enterprise D from Star Trek: The Next Generation. CNBC did a special on the house in 2014.

== Philanthropy ==
In 2001, he joined the Board of Trustees of New York University and Board of Trustees New York University School of Medicine. At NYU he formed the Marc Bell Public Service Scholarship Award Program. At NYU Langone Health, he formed the Marc Bell Vascular Biology & Disease Program.

In 2013 Bell created The Boca Raton Police Foundation. He later retired as chairman in 2024.

On September 13, 2017, Bell took in 70 foster kids who were displaced during a Hurricane Irma from local shelters.
