= Digital Realty =

American data center provider

Digital Realty Trust, Inc.
- Type: Public company
- Traded as: NYSE: DLR; S&P 500 component
- Industry: Real estate investment trust
- Founded: 2004; 22 years ago
- Headquarters: Austin, Texas, U.S.
- Key people: Mary Hogan Preusse (Chairman); Andrew P. Power (CEO & President)
- Products: Data centers
- Revenue: ▲US$4.69 billion (2022)
- Net income: ▲US$2.47 billion (2022)
- Total assets: ▲US$153.32 billion (2022)
- Total equity: ▲US$9.879 billion (2019)
- Number of employees: 3,450 (2023)
- Website: digitalrealty.com

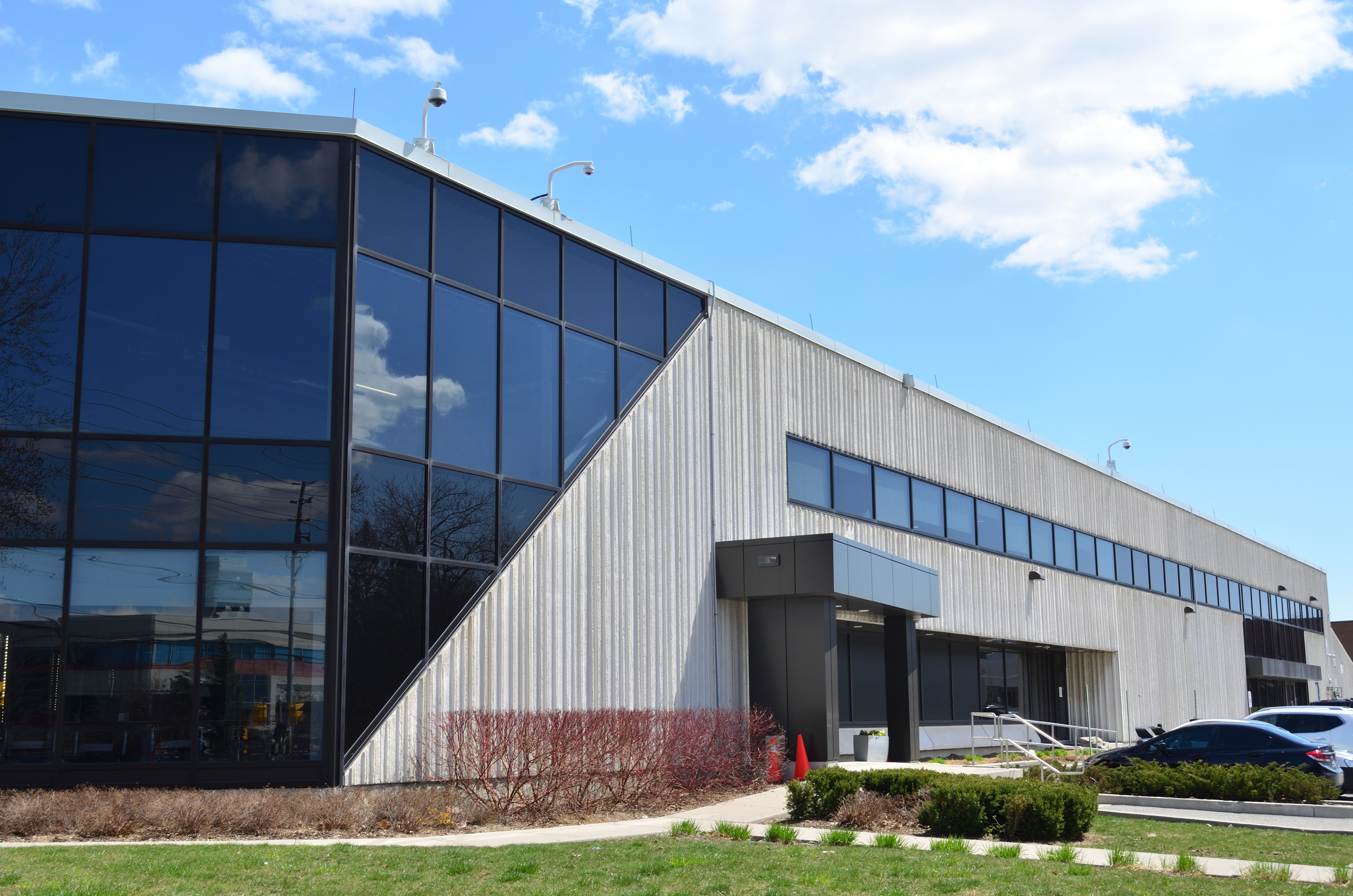
Digital Realty data center in Markham, Ontario

Digital Realty is an American real estate investment trust that owns, operates, and invests in carrier-neutral data centers across the world. The company offers data center, colocation, and interconnection services. It was formed in 2004 by GI Partners. As of June 2023, Digital Realty has over 300 facilities in more than 25 countries.

The company is a signatory of the Climate Neutral Data Center Pact (CNDCP), a self-regulatory initiative – drawn up with the European Data Center Association (EUDCA) and Cloud Infrastructure Services Provider in Europe (CISPE) – designed to make the industry climate-neutral by 2030.

Digital Realty is working to switch to renewable power. The company has 1 GW of wind and solar projects under contract in Texas, Illinois, North Carolina, Oregon, Arizona, and Virginia and has installed 1.8 MW of solar panels in Kenya, Greece, Switzerland, and South Korea.

== History ==
The company was formed in 2004 by GI Partners, which contributed 21 data centers that it acquired through bankruptcy auctions and from distressed companies at a 20%–40% discount to replacement cost. On November 4, 2004, the company became a public company via an initial public offering. At that time, the company owned 23 properties comprising 5.6 million square feet.

In August 2006, the company acquired a property in Phoenix, Arizona, for $175 million. By March 2007, GI Partners had sold all of its shares in the company.

=== 2010s ===
In January 2010, the company acquired three data centers in Massachusetts and Connecticut for $375 million.

In January 2012, the company acquired a 334,000-square-foot data center near Hartsfield-Jackson Atlanta International Airport for $63 million in a leaseback transaction. That same month, the company also acquired a data center in San Francisco for $85 million.

In April 2013, the company acquired the data center of Delta Air Lines in Eagan, Minnesota, for $37 million in a leaseback transaction. In July 2013, the company doubled capacity at its data center in Chandler, Arizona.

In October 2015, the company acquired Telx for $1.886 billion. In November 2015, the company acquired 125.9 acres of undeveloped land in Loudoun County, Virginia, for $43 million and announced plans to build a 2 million-square-foot data center on the property.

In July 2016, the company acquired eight data centers in Europe from Equinix for $874 million.

In March 2017, the company announced a $22 million expansion of its data center in Atlanta. In September 2017, the company completed the acquisition of DuPont Fabros Technology.

In 2018, the Supreme Court ruled in favor of the company in Digital Realty Trust, Inc. v. Somers, a case in which Digital Realty fired an employee who had complained internally about the elimination of supervisory controls and the hiding of cost overruns. After he was fired, the employee sued the company, saying he was protected by whistleblower provisions in Dodd-Frank. The Supreme Court, citing Dodd-Frank, ruled that these protections only applied to whistleblowers who had first notified the SEC.

Also in 2018, Digital Realty earned the U.S. Environmental Protection Agency's (EPA's) ENERGY STAR certification for energy performance in 24 of its data centers. In December 2018, the company acquired Ascenty for $1.8 billion. At the time, Ascenty operated eight data centers in Brazil.

In October 2019, Digital Realty announced the acquisition of European data center provider Interxion for $8.4 billion to "create a leading global provider of data centre, colocation and interconnection solutions".

=== 2020s ===
In 2020, Digital Realty joined the Science-Based Target Initiative (SBTi), promising to reduce its Scope 1 and 2 emissions by 68% and Scope 3 emissions by 24% between 2018 and 2030.

In January 2021, Digital Realty said it would move its headquarters to Austin, Texas.

In October 2021, the company entered the West African market by acquiring a controlling stake in Medallion Communications, a leading carrier-neutral data center operator in Nigeria.

In January 2022, the company announced a 55% stake acquisition in Teraco Data Centres.

In July 2023, Digital Realty received a Certificate of Conformity, certifying its adherence to the Self-Regulatory Initiatives set out by the CNDCP in Europe.

On 10 September 2024, about 7:45 am, a Digital Realty data centre in Loyang, Singapore, caught fire. According to the Singapore Civil Defence Force, the fire "involved lithium-ion batteries housed in battery rooms on the third floor of a four-storey building". Digital Realty said its employees were evacuated from the data centre without injuries. The fire affected Lazada and Bytedance's systems, as well as Alibaba Cloud's Availability zone C in Singapore, and possibly DigitalOcean, Coolify, and Cloudflare.

In May 2026, the company opened its first data center in Barcelona, Spain, broke ground on a data center in Paris, France, and launched a new liquid cooling lab in London, UK. That same month, it was also announced that Mistral AI had signed a capacity agreement with Digital Realty.

In June 2026, Digital Realty announced plans to buy venture capital firm Columbia Capital for about $485 million.
