= Service Profile Identifier =

A Service Profile Identifier (SPID) is a number issued by ISDN service providers in North America that identifies the services and features of an ISDN circuit. Service providers typically assign each B channel a unique SPID. A SPID is derived from the telephone number assigned to the circuit, and in the U.S. it typically follows a generic, 14-digit format.

A SPID (Service Profile Identifier) is a number assigned by a phone company to a terminal on an Integrated Services Digital Network B-channel. A SPID tells equipment at the phone company's central office about the capabilities of each terminal (computer or phone) on the B-channels. A Basic Rate home or business user may divide service into two B-channels with one used for normal phone service and the other for computer data. The SPID tells the phone company whether the terminal accepts voice or data information.

The SPID is a numeric string from 3 to 20 digits in length. A SPID (or more than one, if necessary) is assigned when the ISDN Basic Rate Interface (BRI) is obtained from the phone company. Starting in 1998, most phone companies began to use a generic SPID format. In this format, the SPID is a 14-digit number that includes a 10-digit telephone number (which includes the 3-digit Numbering Plan Area code), a 2-digit Sharing Terminal Identifier, and a 2-digit Terminal Identifier (TID). The generic SPID format makes it easier to tell users what to specify when installing an ISDN line and simplifies corporate installation procedures.

Back in 1998, some ISDN manufacturers began to provide non-initializing terminals (NITs) that do not require the entering of a SPID. Manufacturers also are delivering terminals with automated SPID selection in which the correct SPID is downloaded to the terminal rather than having to be specified by the user.
