= Quality Technology Services =

Data center company in the US

Quality Technology Services (registered as QTS Realty Trust, Inc.)
- Trade name: Quality Technology Services
- Industry: Computing
- Founded: 2003; 23 years ago
- Founder: Chad L. Williams
- Headquarters: Ashburn, Virginia, United States
- Products: Data centers
- Revenue: ▲$480 million (2019)
- Net income: ▲$31 million (2019)
- Total assets: ▲$3.223 billion (2019)
- Total equity: ▲$1.444 billion (2019)
- Number of employees: 612 (2019)
- Parent: Blackstone Group (2021–Present)
- Website: q.com

Quality Technology Services (QTS or QTS Data Centers) is an American provider of carrier-neutral data centers and provides colocation services within North America and the Netherlands and is headquartered in Overland Park, Kansas. The company's largest operating areas are: Northern Virginia, Dallas/Fort Worth, Chicago, Hillsboro, Oregon and New Jersey in the United States and United Kingdom, the Netherlands in Europe.

In 2019 and 2020 the company was named the most sustainable company in the data center industry for two years in a row by World Finance Magazine. The company is also a member of the RE100, a global corporate leadership initiative bringing together influential businesses committed to 100% renewable electricity.

On August 31, 2021, QTS announced that companies affiliated with the Blackstone Group had completed the acquisition of the company for approximately $10 billion.

== History ==
=== Timeline ===
In 2003, Chad Williams founded the company with the purchase of a data center in Kansas.

In October 2005, the company acquired Deltacom's e^deltacom business unit and its data center in Suwanee, Georgia for $26 million.

In October 2006, the company acquired a 960,000 square foot data center in Atlanta as well as Globix Hosting LLC for a total of $161 million. The company also acquired NTT USA LLC, which owned a 130,000 square foot facility in the New York City area.

In December 2007, the company acquired the customers of First National Technology Solutions. The company also acquired 120,000 square feet of data center and office technology space in Silicon Valley.

In April 2008, the company expanded into Florida.

In 2010, the company acquired the former Qimonda semiconductor site in Richmond, Virginia and converted the property into a 1.3 million square foot mega data center. The MAREA and BRUSA subsea cable systems operated by Telxius terminate in this facility, forming the QTS Richmond Network Access Point. The QTS Richmond Network Access Point or the NAP was co-founded by Clint Heiden, former Chief Revenue Officer of QTS and Vinay Nagpal, President of InterGlobix, LLC.

In 2011, the company acquired a data center in Lenexa, Kansas.

In January 2013, the company acquired Herakles LLC and its 92,000 square-foot data center in San Francisco. In February that same year the company acquired 40 acres in Irving, Texas for construction of a data center facility. In October, the company became a public company via an initial public offering.

In April 2014, the company acquired the former Chicago Sun-Times plant with plans to convert it into a data center. In June 2015, the company acquired Carpathia Hosting for $326 million.

In June 2016, the company acquired a data center campus in New Jersey from DuPont Fabros Technology for $125 million.

In January 2017, the company acquired a 260,000 square foot data center in Irving, Texas for $50 million.

In May 2017, the company acquired a 3.4-acre parcel next to its Atlanta facility for $1 million.

In April 2019, the company acquired 2 data centers in the Netherlands (Groningen and Eemshaven) for $44 million.

In November 2019, the company announced the expansion of its Atlanta data center campus, totaling more than 250,000 square feet of leasable capacity. Development finished in 2020.

In 2020, the company expanded its commitment to environmental sustainability by partnering with American Forests and World Vision. The company also started development on its greenfield data center campus in Hillsboro, Oregon with completion in 2021. The data center facility is run entirely with renewable energy.

In 2021, the company announced a total of eight data center facilities utilizing renewable energy to power operations.

In April 2025, Chief Executive Officer and Chairman Chad Williams decided to step down and return to his position as CEO of Quality Group of Companies (QGC), a diversified real estate and business services family office investment company from which QTS was originally founded. Current QTS executives, David Robey, Chief Operating Officer and Tag Greason, Chief Growth Officer, have been appointed Co-CEOs.

In 2025 the company announced the plan for a new data center in the United Kingdom in Cambois. The data center will finish its first phase of construction in 2026 and will fully constructed by 2035.

=== Acquisitions and expansions ===
In 2021, Blackstone Group Inc.'s infrastructure unit, Blackstone Infrastructure Partners and its nontraded real-estate investment trust, known as BREIT, have agreed to pay $78 a share for QTS. The acquisition was completed on August 31, 2021.

=== Concerns over water usage ===
In 2025, a QTS data center in Fayetteville, Georgia drained around 30 million gallons of water through water connections that were not disclosed to Fayette County, with QTS having to pay $150,000 in retroactive fees. The unregistered connections were discovered following an investigation after residents complained of low water pressure. The incident prompted community outrage; residents had already been instructed by Fayette County to limit water consumption during drought conditions in Georgia at the time.

== Data center locations ==
QTS operates 28 data center locations across the United States and Netherlands in the following areas:

=== United States ===
- Arizona
- California
- Florida
- Georgia
- Illinois
- Kansas
- New Jersey
- Oregon
- Texas
- Virginia
- Ohio
- Colorado
- Iowa
- South Carolina
- Utah

=== Netherlands ===
- Eemshaven
- Groningen

=== United Kingdom ===
- Cambois, Northumberland (First phase will be completed in 2026)
