= DuPont Fabros Technology =

American data center provider

DuPont Fabros Technology, Inc.
- Industry: Real estate investment trust
- Founded: March 2, 2007; 19 years ago
- Defunct: September 14, 2017; 9 years ago
- Fate: Acquired by Digital Realty
- Headquarters: Washington, D.C.
- Key people: Christopher P. Eldredge, CEO; Lammot J. du Pont, Chairman; Jeffrey H. Foster, CFO
- Products: Data centers
- Revenue: ▲$0.528 billion (2016)
- Net income: ▲$0.181 billion (2016)
- Total assets: ▲$3.034 billion (2016)
- Total equity: ▲$0.962 billion (2016)
- Number of employees: 122

DuPont Fabros Technology, Inc. (DFT) was a real estate investment trust that invested in carrier-neutral data centers and provided colocation and peering services. In 2017, the company was acquired by Digital Realty.

== Operations ==
As of December 31, 2016, the company owned 11 operating data center facilities comprising over 3.3 million net rentable square feet. Eight of the properties were in Northern Virginia, two were in Elk Grove Village, Illinois, and one was in Santa Clara, California.

The company leased space to companies, on a wholesale level, in which such companies rented space to build their own data centers.

The company had 32 customers and derived 92% of its revenue from its 15 largest customers. The company's largest customers included Microsoft (25.4% of revenue), Facebook (20.2% of revenue), Rackspace (9.0% of revenue), and Yahoo! (6.0% of revenue).

== History ==
The company was co-founded by Lammot J. du Pont, an analyst for JPMorgan Chase and Hossein Fateh, a real estate developer in the Washington metropolitan area. The company sought to acquire data centers that belonged to defunct internet service providers.

In 2004, the company's predecessor acquired 5 data centers from Savvis for $52 million in a leaseback transaction.

In 2005, the company's predecessor acquired a 230,000 square foot data center from AOL for $58.5 million.

On March 2, 2007, the company was incorporated as a real estate investment trust.

In October 2007, the company became a public company via an initial public offering that raised $640 million, the 7th largest initial public offering of a real estate investment trust at that time.

In early 2008, the company halted construction projects due to a lack of financing.

In 2009, the company was named as the fastest growing company in the Washington metro area by American City Business Journals.

In February 2011, Mohammed Mark Amin resigned from the board of directors and was replaced by John T. Roberts Jr.

In 2012, Hossein Fateh, the chief executive officer of the company, forgone his $450,000 salary in exchange for use of the company jet.

In 2012, the company reported that the volume of leasing was the largest in company history.

In May 2012, Mohammed Mark Amin, formerly a director of the company, was accused by the U.S. Securities and Exchange Commission of making a $618,000 profit as a result of insider trading in the company's securities.

In September 2014, the company opened a new data center in Ashburn, Virginia.

In February 2015, Christopher P. Eldredge was named chief executive officer of the company.

In March 2015, the company won the Brill Award For Data Center Design issued by Uptime Institute.

In March 2016, the company acquired a 46.7 acre parcel of land in Hillsboro, Oregon for $11.2 million.

In June 2016, the company sold a 38-acre data center in New Jersey to Quality Technology Services for $125 million.

In October 2016, the company acquired the former printing plant of the Toronto Star for C$54.25 million, with plans to convert it to a data center.

In May 2017, the company acquired a 56.5-acre undeveloped site in Mesa, Arizona with plans to construct a data center campus.

In September 2017, the company was acquired by Digital Realty.
