= Maximilian Raynor =

British fashion designer

- Born: 1999 or 2000 (age 26–27)
- Education: Central Saint Martins
- Occupation: Fashion designer
- Website: maximilianraynor.com

Maximilian Raynor is a British fashion designer.

== Early life and education ==
Raynor grew up on a farm in Derbyshire. He first started sketching designs at the age of 3. When he was 10, Raynor wrote a letter to Vivienne Westwood and was invited to spend a week in her studio. He cites Westwood as a major inspiration, alongside Alexander McQueen and John Galliano.

After being twice rejected from Central Saint Martins, Raynor spent time studying at Ravensbourne University London and Kingston University. His third application was successful, and he graduated from Central Saint Martins with a BA in Fashion Design with Marketing in 2022, and a MA in 2024. His graduate collection featured in the British and Italian editions of Vogue magazine.

== Career ==
In 2023, Raynor was selected for the LVMH scholarship. Perfect Magazine also selected Raynor for a mentorship with Tommy Hilfiger.

Raynor spent time working at JW Anderson under Jonathan Anderson, before launching his own eponymous label in 2022. Raynor was listed as a potential candidate in Vogue's "Who is the next Jonathan Anderson?"

His debut collection Manor for Heaven was described as a "standout" in the Central Saint Martins MA show. Welcome to the Un-United Kingdom, Raynor's debut solo show, was presented off-schedule during London Fashion Week Autumn/Winter 2025. The collection told the story of a dystopian world in the year 3025.

The Spring/Summer 2026 collection I’ll Cry If I Want To marked Raynor's on-schedule debut at London Fashion Week. The show drew on his own family history, imagining a party with ancestors across eras. His Autumn/Winter 2026 show Post Me Your Last Kiss was inspired by a recent breakup.

Raynor gained further public recognition by dressing pop stars including Lady Gaga, Rita Ora, and Chappell Roan, who wore his look on the cover of Rolling Stone. He was the creative director of Jade Thirwall's music video Church.

Raynor has been recognised for his efforts to support sustainability and create an environmentally conscious brand. He was the UK winner of the Circular Design Challenge.

Raynor was awarded the jury prize at the prestigious ITS competition in 2025. He was selected for Drapers 30 Under 30 in 2026.

== Personal life ==
Raynor is queer. He was featured on Attitude Magazine's 101 Queer Trailblazers list in 2026.
