= Cloud28+ =

Cloud computing services marketplace

- Formation: 26 March 2015; 11 years ago
- Founder: Hewlett Packard Enterprise
- Type: Federation
- Purpose: Drive enterprise cloud adoption
- Region served: Worldwide
- Website: https://www.cloud28plus.com

Cloud28+ is a worldwide cloud computing services marketplace and federation of cloud computing organizations. It was developed and is sponsored by Hewlett Packard Enterprise (HPE). In December 2016 it was the world's biggest aggregator of cloud computing services.

The federation originally launched in Europe in March 2015, with the aim of accelerating cloud adoption in Europe. It opened up to members worldwide in November 2016, at which point it had around 330 member companies and offered around 1,300 infrastructure-as-a-service (IaaS), platform-as-a-service (PaaS), and software-as-a-service (SaaS) services.

== History ==
Cloud28+ launched at an HPE event in Frankfurt, Germany in March 2015. It had been in development since April 2014, with the purpose of creating a single catalogue of European cloud computing services. HP had been "trying to figure out how we grow an ecosystem of cloud suppliers in Europe, mapping services providers with ISVs and resellers," according to HP executive Xavier Poisson Gouyou Beauchamps.

On 6 June 2017, Poisson won the "Cloud Leadership Award 2017" from Datacloud Europe, with judges citing the growth of Cloud28+ in making their selection.

Microsoft joined Cloud28+ as a technology partner in July 2017, pledging to collaborate with HPE to create a new on-boarding programme designed to bring more independent software vendors (ISVs) to the marketplace. In February 2018, Mphasis partnered with HPE Cloud28+ for specific solutions and services.

== Services ==
At launch, Cloud28+ required that services in its catalog be built on the HPE Helion version of the OpenStack open-source cloud software platform. In May 2016, support was extended to include Microsoft Azure, VMware, Docker and other technologies. The service hub was also extended with an App Center, which automates installation of Docker-based applications.
