= Telehouse Europe =

British telecommunications service provider

Coordinates: 51.5116°N 0.0013°W

Telehouse
- Type: Subsidiary
- Industry: Telecommunications
- Founded: 1988
- Headquarters: London, England, UK
- Products: Data centre services
- Parent: KDDI Corporation
- Website: www.telehouse.net

Telehouse is a major carrier-neutral colocation, information and communications technology services provider based in Docklands, London. Established in 1988, it operates in London, Paris and Frankfurt. Part of the global Telehouse network of data centres, the brand has more than 45 colocation facilities in more than 20 major cities around the world including Istanbul, Beijing, Shanghai, Hong Kong, Singapore, Vietnam, Tokyo, Toronto, New York and Los Angeles. KDDI, Telehouse's Japanese telecommunications and systems integration parent company, operates data centre facilities in America and Asia.

== Operations ==
=== London ===
Operational since 1990, Telehouse North became Europe's first purpose-built neutral colocation facility. LINX traffic has been moving through the carrier-neutral Telehouse campus since its opening. Telehouse hosts the vast majority of internet peering traffic from LINX.

It is the main hub of the Internet in the United Kingdom. In response to growing demand for a Central London location, Telehouse opened an additional colocation facility, Telehouse Metro, in 1997, in the London Borough of Islington near Silicon Roundabout. Telehouse Metro closed in 2020.

A second building at the Docklands site, Telehouse East, was opened in 1999 and the construction of a third building, Telehouse West, at its Docklands site was completed in March 2010. In July 2014 KDDI announced that a fourth building North Two would be built on the site, adjacent to the existing Telehouse North building. In August 2016, Telehouse Europe opened $177 million North Two data center of 24,000 square meters, increasing its capacity at the Docklands site where it already had 73,000 square meters of space. According to Telehouse, North Two is the only UK data center to own a 132 kV on-campus grid substation that is directly connected to the National Grid, reducing transmission losses and improving power density and service continuity. North Two also utilizes the first multi-storey adiabatic cooling system in the world, delivering an industry-leading 1.16 PUE. The site has a capacity of up to 73 MVA in total.

Telehouse London is the primary home of the London Internet Exchange since 1994, while UK internet exchanges like LONAP are also present.

In 2012, Telehouse built their own primary substation, at 50MVA and two 132kVA power lines directly connected to the high voltage power network for the London Docklands site.

As of March 2019, Telehouse London North is listed as most populated datacenter in EMEA by the data center rankings, working with over 530 network carriers, ISPs and ASPs, including Amazon Web Services, Google Cloud Platform and Microsoft Azure, as well as CenturyLink, Hurricane Electric, Interoute, Voxility, TeliaSonera and NTT communications. Existing Telehouse customers can interconnect to any of these parties via a cross connect.

=== Paris ===
Telehouse Europe operates three sites in Paris:

- Telehouse Paris Jeûneurs. Opened in 1996 near the famous Rue du Sentier.
- Telehouse Paris Voltaire which opened in 1998.
- Telehouse Magny-Les-Hameaux (Yvelines département). Originally a national military defence location, the site was converted into a data centre in 2009 and now provides 15,000 square meters of colocation space.

=== Frankfurt ===
Telehouse Europe also operates one site in Frankfurt:

- Telehouse Frankfurt. Opened in 2012, Telehouse acquired one of Germany's largest colocation sites, Databurg.
