= Gigas (company) =

Spanish cloud computing company

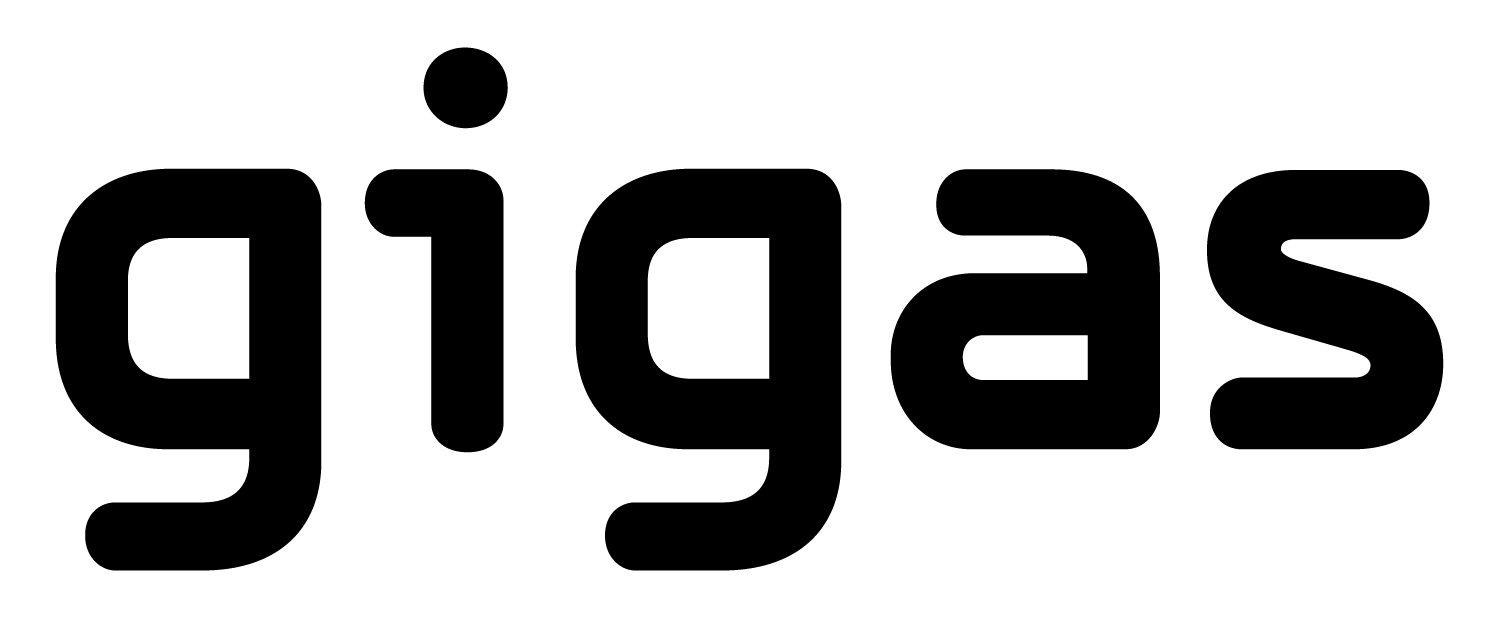
- Website type: Web service, cloud computing
- Owner: Gigas.com
- Website: gigas.com/en
- Launched: 2011

Gigas is an international cloud computing services company based in Madrid, Spain. The company began as a start-up in 2011. The company has data centers in Madrid and Miami, and offices in Spain, US, Colombia, Chile, Peru and Panama.

Gigas founding team, led by CEO Diego Cabezudo and COO José Antonio Arribas, is made up of former directors of technology and telecommunications companies in Europe.

== Data centers ==
Gigas' systems are hosted in the Interxion collocation facility in Madrid and in Verizon Terremark's NAP of the Americas, in Miami.

== Ownership ==
Gigas is a private company founded in 2011 by five individuals in the communications and internet sector in Spain and internationally. The project has the support of venture capital firms including Cabiedes & Partners, Bonsai Venture Capital and Caixa Capital Risc.

== Growth ==
Gigas has seen rapid growth since its founding in 2011. It has opened its offices in Bogota, Medellín, Santiago de Chile, Lima. and Panama. Gigas attributes its success in Spanish speaking markets to its local, culturally aware, in-language technical support offered by the company's in-house team of engineers and systems administrators.
