= Michael Tobin (entrepreneur) =

English entrepreneur

Michael Tobin CBE
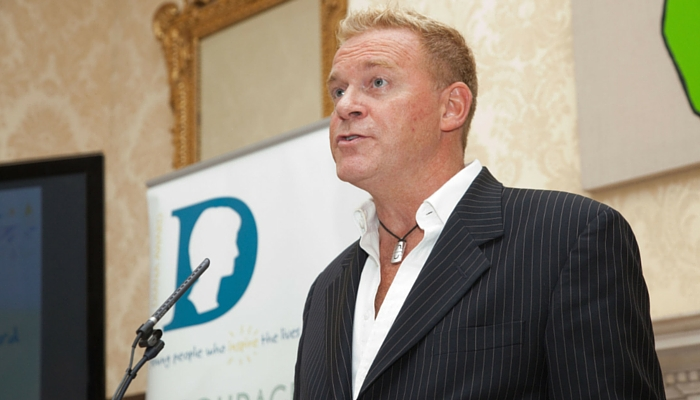
- Born: Michael Tobin; 16 January 1964 (age 62); London
- Occupations: Entrepreneur, Businessman, Author
- Spouse: Shalina Tobin
- Children: 3

Michael Tobin CBE (born 16 January 1964) is an English technology entrepreneur, author and philanthropist. He was CEO of FTSE 250 data centre operator. In 2014 he was awarded an OBE for his ‘Services to the Digital Economy' in The Queen's Birthday Honours List. In June 2025 he was awarded a CBE in The King's Birthday Honours List for 'Services to Charity'.

== Career ==
=== Business career ===
Following roles at ICG, GlobalServe, Rockwell Corp, Goupil, Tricord, ICL and Fujitsu Tobin joined Redbus as Sales and Marketing Director. Becoming CEO in 2003, he led the merger between competitors Redbus and Telecity. In 2006 Tobin became CEO of the newly formed TelecityGroup. He implemented Telecity’s ‘gold standard’ membership of the Green Grid global consortium, and led Telecity to achieve the Carbon Trust Standard in 2010; the first data centre operator to do so.

In 2014 he stepped down from TelecityGroup following reported tensions with the board of directors, and founded Tobin Ventures Ltd.

=== Non-executive Directorships and Board roles ===
Tobin holds many non-executive roles internationally, which include: CloudHesive, AudioBoom, Stellanor, Mediterra, Bigblu Broadband (formerly Satellite Solutions Worldwide Plc (Europasat)), North C Data Centres, Ocolo, Radius Global Infrastructure, EdgeConneX, and ScaleUp Group.

Tobin is also an Advisory Board Member to LeaseWeb.

He previously held non-executive roles for Pentadyne Power Corporation, Pacnet, TeamRock, Wonderland Restaurants, Patchwork Health, ThinkLondon, Ultraleap, People Per Hour, Instrumental, Amito, SVF Investment Corp 3, Sungard, Datapipe, Pulsant, Basefarm, Chayora, IXCellerate, Teraco Data Environments, Kinolt (formerly EURO-DIESEL), Park Place Technologies, Hurley Palmer Flatt, PlusServer and ITconic.

=== Charitable activities ===
Tobin started the CEO Sleepout UK charitable initiative in 2014 with Tony Hawkhead, CEO of Action for Children, where CEOs sleep out on the street to raise the profile of the issue of homelessness for children.

Tobin has raised over £250,000 for The Prince's Trust, including £100,000 from running 40 marathons in 40 days during 2016 for the Trust's 40th Anniversary.

In 2020, Tobin raised over £200,000 for The Brain Tumour Charity by trekking to the South Pole.

Tobin is Founder of The Tobin Foundation and has raised over £100,000 to date for Education, Empowerment and Welfare of Children.

Tobin has also been a champion of the Duke of Edinburgh Awards, Founder's Circle Member of the British Asian Trust, Chairman of the Loomba Foundation, patron of Action Against Hunger, fundraising member of Make-a-Wish Foundation, and Ambassador for The Lewis Moody Foundation.

== Books ==
Tobin is the author of four books:

- A Perfect Storm: How to thrive in an uncertain and ever-changing world, 2023. ISBN 9781915850157
- Lifting the Floor: Revealed, the true stories hiding beneath the tiles of the data centre industry, 2020. ISBN 9781913709006
- Live Love Work Prosper: A Fresh Approach to Integrating Life and Work, 2018. ISBN 9781781258767
- Forget Strategy. Get Results: Radical Management Attitudes That Will Deliver Outstanding Success, 2014. ISBN 9781118808788

== Awards ==
- In 2025, Tobin was recognised with an CBE for his 'Services to Charity' which was presented to him by William, Prince of Wales.
- Lifetime Achievement Award from The Tech Capital Awards 2025.
- Broadgroup Datacentre Influencer of the Decade 2017.
- Named Smith & Williamson Top 25 Power Individuals. 2017.
- 2016 The Prince's Trust Outstanding Individual Award.
- Best Business Awards & Global Business Excellence Awards for Outstanding Non-Executive Director 2016.
- In 2014, Tobin was recognised with an OBE for his ‘Services to the Digital Economy’ which was presented to him at an investiture ceremony by the Prince of Wales.
- Lifetime Achievement Awards for Services to Datacentre Industry 2011.
- Ernst & Young Entrepreneur of the Year (London regional winner) 2009, 2010 and (UK National winner) 2011.
- Business Person of the Year Award London Chamber of Commerce & Industry 2009 and 2010.
- LCCI Business Growth Company of the Year 2008 & 2009.
- Techmark Personal Achievement of the Year Award 2008.
- UK Innovation Awards for IPO of the Year 2008.
- DCE Outstanding Leader in Datacentres 2007 & 2008.
- PWC Technology CEO of the Year 2007.
- London Business Awards Business Turnaround of the Year 2005.
- Named Number 31 of Britain's Top 50 Entrepreneurs 2005.
