= Leaseweb =

Dutch cloud computing provider

- Company type: Private
- Industry: Hosting; Cloud computing
- Founded: 1997
- Headquarters: Amsterdam, Netherlands
- Area served: Worldwide
- Services: Dedicated Servers; Private cloud Public cloud Hybrid cloud Colocation; Content delivery network Cyber security services Backup
- ASN: 16265
- Website: Leaseweb.com

Leaseweb is a Dutch cloud computing and web services company with offices in the continents of Europe, Asia, and North America.

Leaseweb is a subsidiary of OCOM, an internet services company headquartered in Amsterdam, the Netherlands.

== History ==
Leaseweb was founded in 1997 by Dutch pilots Con Zwinkels and Laurens Rosenthal.

In 1998, Leaseweb acquired its first servers and set up their first office in Utrecht. By 2005 the company owned 5,000 servers, a number that had doubled to 10,000 two years later.

In 2007, Leaseweb relocated the company headquarters to the Amsterdam area. In 2010, Leaseweb acquired German hosting provider Netdirekt. In 2016, Leaseweb acquired the Illinois based Nobis Technology Group, and its Ubiquity Hosting operations. In 2018, Leaseweb USA acquired ServInt, a Northern Virginia-based web hosting and managed hosting services for cloud IT operations. In 2021, Leaseweb acquired iWeb, and their Canadian data centres, from INAP for an undisclosed amount. In February 2023, Leaseweb rebranded their Canadian operations under the name Leaseweb Canada.

== Leaseweb Network ==
The company operates eighteen data centers in Europe, Asia and the United States. Leaseweb peers with Internet exchanges in Amsterdam, Stockholm, Warsaw, Budapest, Vienna, Frankfurt, Dusseldorf, Zurich, Brussels, Paris, Luxembourg, London, Madrid, Washington DC, New York, Miami, Chicago, Atlanta, Dallas, Phoenix, Los Angeles, Palo Alto, Seattle, San Jose, Hong Kong and Singapore.

== Network and datacenters ==
The company operates 26 datacenters in Europe, North America, Asia and the Oceania. Leaseweb peers with Internet exchanges in Amsterdam, Frankfurt, London, New York City, Brussels, Stockholm, Madrid, Zurich, Düsseldorf, Paris, Warsaw, Budapest, Milan, Vienna, Prague, Luxembourg, Bucharest, Bratislava, Copenhagen, Oslo, Ashburn, Miami, Chicago, Dallas, Palo Alto and Los Angeles. Leaseweb's network consists of 55 Points-of-Presence and 33 Internet Exchanges across the globe. The network has a bandwidth capacity of 5.9 Tbit/s with peak traffic about 2.5 Tbit/s and reports uptime of 99.9999%
