= LONAP =

Internet exchange point in the United Kingdom

London Network Access Point
- Abbreviation: LONAP
- Founded: 1997
- Location: United Kingdom, London
- Website: www.lonap.net
- Members: 252 as of January 2026
- Peak: 3 Tbit/s as of July 2026

The London Access Point (LONAP) is a London-based Internet exchange point (IXP) founded in 1997 as a membership organisation and currently has over 200 members, making it the second largest IXP in the UK and around the 15th largest IXP in the world by membership. (Although current traffic levels make it around the 30th largest by bandwidth – see list of Internet exchange points by size.) LONAP currently operates an Arista Networks infrastructure with multiple 100 and 400 Gbit/s links between their sites, specifically:

- Telehouse North
- Telehouse East
- Telehouse West
- Digital Realty Sovereign House (formerly TelecityGroup)
- Equinix LD8 (formerly TelecityGroup) Harbour Exchange, Building 6-7
- InterXion London City
- Equinix LD6, Slough

LONAP hosts an instance of the F Root nameserver.

As a membership-owned organisation, the exchange is owned by the networks which participate on it, who meet at an annual general meeting to vote for the board of directors, approve the budget and discuss the activity plan for the year. Membership is open to any organisation worldwide who operates a network and wishes to peer.

== See also ==
- List of Internet exchange points
