= Equinix =

American internet and data center company

Equinix, Inc.

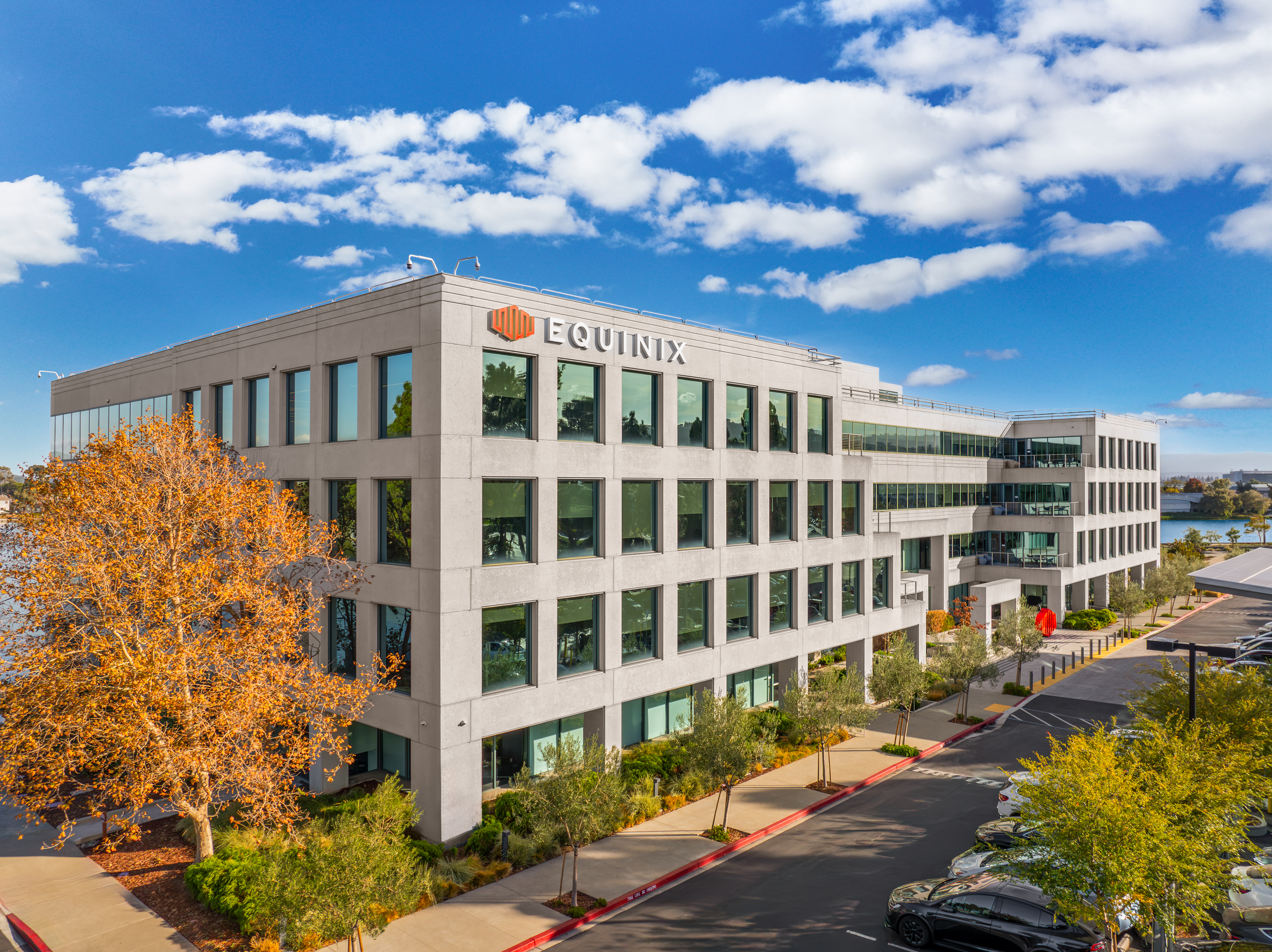
- Headquarters in Redwood City
- Type: Public
- Traded as: Nasdaq: EQIX; S&P 500 component
- ISIN: US29444U7000
- Industry: Internet
- Founded: 1998; 28 years ago
- Founders: Jay Adelson; Al Avery
- Headquarters: Redwood City, California, United States
- Key people: Adaire Fox-Martin (CEO and president)
- Products: Data centers
- Revenue: ▲US$9.22 billion (2025)
- Operating income: ▲US$1.85 billion (2025)
- Net income: ▲US$1.35 billion (2025)
- Total assets: ▲US$40.1 billion (2025)
- Total equity: ▲US$14.2 billion (2025)
- Number of employees: 13,716 (2025)
- Website: equinix.com

Equinix Inc., is an American multinational internet and data center company headquartered in Redwood City, California. It specialized in internet connectivity and data center colocation centers, commonly known as carrier hotels, until the company converted to a real estate investment trust (REIT) in January 2015. It is listed on the Nasdaq stock exchange under the ticker symbol EQIX. As of 2025, the company operates 260 data centers in 33 countries, across five continents and employed more than 13,000 people worldwide.

== History ==
Equinix, Inc., was founded in 1998 by Al Avery and Jay Adelson, who were two facilities managers at Digital Equipment Corporation (DEC). Inspired by Digital's Palo Alto Internet eXchange (PAIX), which proved a successful alternative to the overcrowded MAE-West exchange, Adelson foresaw a chain of similar "telecom hotels" around the world. The firm promoted its data center platform as a neutral place where competing networks could connect and share data traffic. The firm capitalized on the "network effect", through which each new customer would broaden the appeal of its platform. It expanded to the Asia-Pacific in October 2002 and Europe in 2007, followed by Latin America in 2011 and the Middle East in 2013.

In 2018, according to Sludge, Equinix signed three contracts with the U.S. Customs and Border Protection (CBP) to provide technology support equipment totaling over $5 million. In September 2020, the company shifted its branding, describing itself as a "digital infrastructure company".

Equinix data centers in London, UK, engaged with designer Maximilian Raynor, who created a dress from its repurposed data center equipment. The wearable art dress was constructed from 3,600 meters of network cables and was revealed at Raynor's London Fashion Week pre-show in February 2025.

=== Acquisitions and expansion ===
In 2002, Equinix merged with I-STT, the Internet infrastructure service subsidiary of Singapore Technologies Telemedia, and Pihana Pacific. This established the company's presence in China, Singapore, Australia, and Japan. In 2007, the firm entered the European market by acquiring data center operator IXEurope and its facilities. In 2010, Equinix opened its 50th data center in London. Over the next seven years, the company nearly tripled its data center portfolio. The company attributed this growth to increased demand, which was caused by the emergence of cloud computing, the Internet of Things, and big data.

In 2010, the company purchased Switch and Data Facilities Company, Inc., a U.S. Internet exchange and colocation services provider. In 2012, the company extended its operations to the Middle East, expanding to Dubai, and in Southeast Asia, specifically Indonesia. Also in 2012, it acquired Hong Kong-based data center provider Asia-Tone. In 2014, Equinix increased its Latin American presence when it acquired ALOG Datacenters of Brazil S.A., the country's leading provider of carrier-neutral data centers.

In 2015, Equinix converted to a real estate investment trust (REIT) to gain tax advantages and add shareholder value. That same year, it acquired the professional services company Nimbo.

In May 2015, Equinix said it would purchase the British company TelecityGroup, the largest acquisition in the company's history. The offer was cleared by the European Commission (EC) in November, after Equinix agreed to sell eight of its data centers around Europe to Digital Realty, while retaining its Telecity Harbour Exchange data center in London Docklands, an acquisition Equinix completed in a transaction valued at approximately $3.8 billion. The addition of these data centers more than doubled Equinix's capacity in Europe. In December 2015, the company purchased Japanese provider Bit-Isle, adding six data centers in Japan.

In 2016, Equinix announced a deal to acquire 29 data centers in 15 markets from Verizon.

In 2017, the firm opened a new data center in São Paulo, Brazil. That same year, Equinix acquired Itconic, which expanded its data center footprint into Spain and Portugal.

In 2018, Equinix purchased the Dallas Infomart building, where it had already been operating four data centers. It also acquired Australian data center provider Metronode and its 10 data centers. The company opened its first data center in South Korea the next year.

In 2020, Equinix finalized the purchase of Packet, a startup that provided bare-metal servers as a cloud service. The company expanded into India in August 2020, with the acquisition of GPX India, including a campus in Mumbai with two data centers. In October 2020, Equinix completed the acquisition of 13 Bell Canada data centers. The company also invested heavily in hyperscale xScale data centers.

On December 7, 2021, Equinix announced its acquisition of Main One, a West African data center and connectivity solutions provider, for $320 million.

In March 2022, Equinix expanded into Chile and Peru with a $758 million acquisition of four data centers from Entel. In November 2022, Equinix announced its market entry into Malaysia with plans to build a new International Business Exchange (IBX) data center located in Iskandar Puteri, Johor Bahru, Johore called JH1. With an initial investment of approximately $40 million, JH1 launched operations in Q1 2024, providing 500 cabinets and 1,960 square meters of colocation space.

In 2024, the company announced a $390 million expansion plan to build more data centers in Africa over the next five years. Later that year, it partnered with the Canada Pension Plan Investment Board and Singapore's GIC to develop new data centers, expecting to meet demand resulting from a boom in artificial intelligence (AI). The company also announced their expansion to Thailand that year, with two data centers in Bangkok expected to open in 2027.

In May 2026, it was announced that Equinix would be investing over $190 million to build a data center in Kuala Lumpur, its fourth facility in Malaysia. Later that month, Equinix opened a new data center, MD5, in Madrid, Spain, as part of a $535 million expansion.

=== Environmental impacts ===
In 2015, Equinix announced a long-term commitment to power its data centers with clean, renewable energy. The announcement followed criticism from the environmental group Greenpeace in 2014, which said in a report on internet companies’ environmental practices that Equinix was not doing enough to address renewable energy use or carbon emissions. In response, the company signed agreements with wind farms in Texas and Oklahoma to purchase renewable energy to offset electricity use at its North American data centers.

In September 2020, Equinix issued $1.35 billion in green bonds to help fund environmental projects. At the same time, the company introduced a Green Finance Framework to describe how it reports on and tracks projects funded through green debt.

In January 2021, Equinix joined the Climate Neutral Data Centre Pact, committing to make their data centers climate neutral by 2030.

In 2024, the company expanded a heat export program that redirects excess heat from its data centers to nearby buildings. That year, Equinix vice president Christopher Wellise said that rising energy use from AI was increasing strain on electrical grids. and that AI development needed to be considered with sustainability in mind.

Equinix’s environmental efforts have been recognized by external organizations. The U.S. Environmental Protection Agency (EPA) named the company a Green Power Partner in 2019 and 2020.

In May 2026, Equinix faced challenges from social movement the Housing Assembly (HA) and UK non-profit Foxglove regarding the company's plans to build two data centers in Cape Town, South Africa. A formal objection from city planners said the plans should not be approved without Equinix disclosing its water, power, and environmental impacts.

== Data centers ==
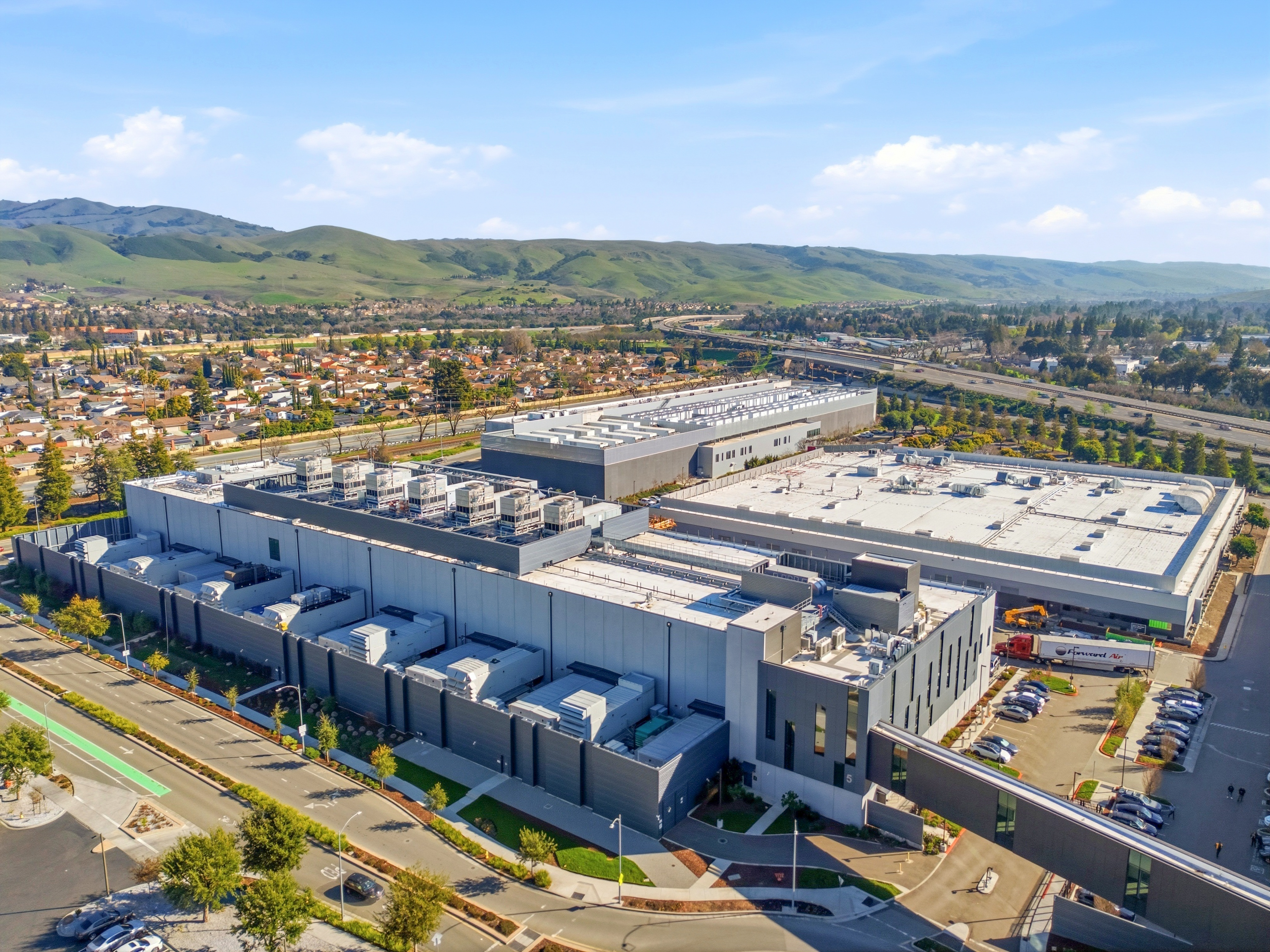
Equinix's Silicon Valley Data Center campus in San Jose, California, located in the Santa Teresa district

Equinix invested more than $25 billion in its data center platform. Equinix rebranded its data centers to International Business Exchanges (IBXs). In 2017, the company launched its own data center infrastructure management platform, IBX SmartView. The company's Internet exchange service allows Internet service providers and enterprises to exchange Internet traffic through a global peering tool.

=== Data center (IBX) locations ===
- Americas: the United States, Brazil, Canada, Colombia, Chile, Mexico, Peru
- Asia-Pacific: Australia, China, Hong Kong, Indonesia, Japan, South Korea, Singapore, India, Malaysia
- Europe and Middle East: Bulgaria, Finland, France, Germany, Ireland, Italy, Netherlands, Poland, Portugal, Spain, Sweden, Switzerland, Turkey, the United Arab Emirates, Oman, the United Kingdom
- Africa: Nigeria, South Africa, Côte d'Ivoire, Ghana

== Corporate affairs ==
Equinix has been described as a leader in the global data center industry. It operates over 260 data centers, in 33 countries, across five continents. Equinix is listed on the Nasdaq stock exchange under the ticker symbol EQIX. As of December 2023, it employed approximately 13,000 people worldwide.

In late 2024, the company laid off approximately 3% of its global workforce, affecting around 400 employees.

== See also ==
- Cloud computing
- List of Internet exchange points
- List of public REITs in the United States
- Yotta Data Services
