= Mark Gillett =

British business executive and technologist

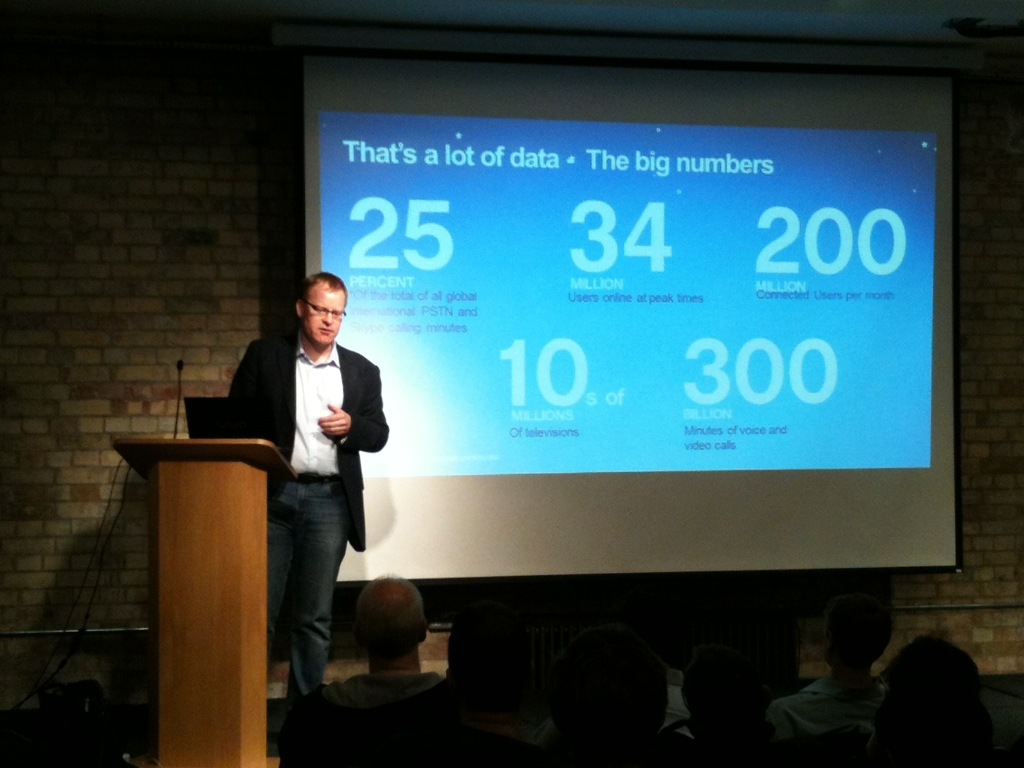
- Gillett in 2012
- Occupations: Operating partner, Business executive
- Known for: Skype
- Title: Managing Director, Silver Lake Partners

Mark Gillett is a British business executive and technologist. He is currently a partner, managing director and the senior operating partner at Silver Lake Partners, one of the largest global technology investment funds and the Co-CEO at Qualtrics.

Gillett's experience spans leading the product management and development of embedded software and devices, and large scale cloud services. Much of his experience has focused on organisations undergoing operational, management, or technical change as a result of growth, change, of ownership/strategy or stress. He is best known for the rapid growth in users and value at Skype and his work leading and transforming engineering and operations at the company he took as Chief Development and Operations Officer while Skype was an independent company, prior to its acquisition by Microsoft. Gillett served as corporate vice-president for Lync and Skype at Microsoft from 2011 to 2013. Gillett has been granted a number of US and international patents in the fields of security, mobile computing, networking and communications.

== Silver Lake ==
Having previously been a partner at Silver Lake from 2009 prior to his executive roles at Skype and Microsoft, Gillett returned to the technology private equity firm as managing director and head of value creation in late 2013.

== Microsoft ==
From Microsoft's acquisition of Skype in 2011, Gillett led Skype's product, engineering and operations globally and in January 2013 when the Microsoft Lync organisation was merged with Skype he also assumed responsibility for the Lync business at Microsoft. From Microsoft's re-organisation in June 2013, Gillett served as corporate vice-president of the 'Applications and Services Group'. Gillett led the planning and execution for Skype's integration into Microsoft in addition to the significant re-organization of the product and operations functions as Chief Development and Operating Officer of the company prior to Microsoft's acquisition. Gillett's leadership was marked by significant re-architecture to support mobile clients and Microsoft's Windows 8 and Windows Phone 8 operating systems in 2012, and significant architectural and design refreshes for Skype's mobile clients in 2013. Gillett announced the company's new architecture in a blog post about a new Skype Windows 8 client in October 2012 (one year after Skype's acquisition by Microsoft and the same week as Windows 8's launch). In October 2013, Gillett shared news of a significant milestone in Skype's migration to the cloud previewing work to complete Skype's delivery of new mobile messaging, notification and calling technology.

Under Gillett's leadership, Lync Mobile clients were delivered in March 2013 and initial Lync/Skype interoperability was delivered in June 2013. In July 2013, Lync revenue was reported to have accelerated through FY13 to achieve $1Bn for fiscal year ending in June 2013, with over 30% growth reported year on year.

In addition to delivering a new architecture and clients for Microsoft's Windows 8 (October 2012), Windows Phone (November 2012), and Xbox platforms, following the acquisition, Gillett and Tony Bates continued to lead the Skype business with a focus on extending Skype reach and engagement from the web, across mobile and at work with key Microsoft products like Internet Explorer (August 2011) Bing(Skype Bing Reward and Bing Bar in February 2012) Outlook (January 2013), and upgrading Windows Live Messenger with Skype. In May 2013, the final pillar of the initially promised Skype and Microsoft integrations, Skype on Xbox One was announced during the launch of the new console and debuted with the console in November 2013.

Gillett left Microsoft in late 2013 and succeeded Charles Giancarlo as the Head of Value Creation at Silver Lake Partners, where he is responsible for value creation within the firm's portfolio of companies, and manages the firm's operating partner and operating executive team.

== Skype ==
At Skype, Gillett led innovation and the scaling of both the Skype platform and Skype team to support an order of magnitude of growth in connected users to 250M monthly active users by May 2012 and over 350M when he departed in September 2013 with (concurrent) users estimated to have grown from <10M concurrent users in 2009 to >50M by the end of 2012 and >75M in 2013. Just prior to Gillett's departure from Skype at the end of 2013, Skype was carrying over 700Bn minutes of communications annually.

Gillett joined Skype Technologies from Silver Lake Partners as a full-time executive in 2010 following the departure of Madhu Yarlagadda and is credited with re-organizing Skype's global development organisation and transitioning Skype to an agile software development methodology, increasing the frequency with which new versions of products are delivered to users from years down to as little as a month.

Gillett is attributed with leading the growth of Skype's engineering teams in London, Prague and Silicon Valley, growing the worldwide organisation to over 2,000 and London to over 400 Skype Team members with >40% growth in staff during 2012/2013, making London the second-largest site after Redmond, Washington. In addition to a focus on changing working practices, Gillett's leadership has been marked by radical re-design of Skype's offices, most recently in the UK and Czech Republic. Gillett's re-designs started with growth investment in the company's audio visual engineering team in Stockholm and has been marked by the introduction of open-plan working with teams organised into clusters around 'scrum' areas. Similar workspace transformations have recently been ongoing across Microsoft. Following the announcement of the Lync/Skype integration in September 2013, Gillett became involved in the design for a refit of two buildings in Redmond, bringing agile/scrum workspaces and video connected meeting rooms to Redmond.

== Prior to Skype/Microsoft ==
Prior to joining Skype, Gillett was primarily known for his work in turnaround management and Performance improvement of technology and technology related companies. He was a partner at the large-cap private equity firm, Silver Lake Partners, where he was involved in the $2.8 billion (~$4.08 billion in 2025) buyout of Skype from eBay in 2009.

Prior to working at Silver Lake, Gillett was a partner and managing director at Alvarez and Marsal where he was a part of the team that worked with Bryan Marsal, leading the recovery of assets from the bankruptcy of Lehman Brothers. Gillett is reported to have led negotiations amongst the Lehman entities and administrators outside of the US in early 2008 and to have worked as a part of the team until mid-2009. Previously at Alvarez, Gillett was appointed to run the software operations of the failing UK listed software company iSOFT plc which breached its banking agreements in 2006. In 2007, Gillett led the turnaround of the German GPS software and devices business Navigon AG where he drove an aggressive push into early GPS app store applications for smartphones resulting in the Navigon iPhone application.

Gillett was an international quality assurance reviewer for Information Technology Infrastructure Library 2007, where he was a reviewer for the Service Strategy volume of the version 3 refresh project.

== Controversy ==
Gillett's re-organization of the engineering and operations team at Skype was reported as rapid, taking place in only a "short number of months", which courted some controversy and drew attention as a part of a wider criticism of Skype's stock option plan by a disgruntled former employee.

He has also been active in defending the changes made to the Skype business and architecture in the face of criticism from privacy advocates – initially following the 2010 service interruption Gillett's team radically changed Skype's architecture moving away from a pure Peer to Peer approach, implementing cloud based supernodes, and subsequently refuting allegations that these changes had been made to facilitate law enforcement.

Gillett has raised concerns about the volume of skilled Program and Product Management engineers in Europe, specifically calling out the lack of cross trained business oriented engineers.

== Business positions ==
Business positions
Preceded by Charles Giancarlo	Managing Director, Head of Value Creation; Silver Lake Partners; 2013–present	Succeeded by Incumbent
Business positions
Preceded by Scott Durchslag	Chief Operating Officer; Skype Technologies; 2010–2013	Succeeded by Last
Preceded by First	Corporate Vice President Skype & Office 365; Microsoft; 2011–2013	Succeeded by Gurdeep Pall
