= Skype Technologies =

Subsidiary of Microsoft

Skype Technologies S.A.R.L
- Skype Logo (2012-2019)
- Type: Subsidiary
- Industry: Telecommunications
- Founded: 29 August 2003; 23 years ago
- Founder: Janus Friis; Niklas Zennström
- Defunct: 5 May 2025; 18 months ago
- Fate: Dissolved
- Successor: Microsoft
- Headquarters: Luxembourg
- Area served: Worldwide
- Key people: Deepak Kashyap
- Products: Videotelephony; Online chat Business VoIP
- Revenue: 160,000,000 euro (2009)
- Number of employees: ▲788 (2010)
- Parent: eBay (2005–2009); Microsoft (2011–2025)
- Subsidiaries: GroupMe
- Website: www.skype.com

Skype Technologies (also known as Skype Software, Skype Communications, Skype Inc., and Skype Limited) was a telecommunications company headquartered in Luxembourg City, whose chief business was the development and marketing of the video chat and instant messaging computer software program Skype, and various Internet telephony services associated with it. Microsoft purchased the company in 2011, and it had since then operated as their wholly owned subsidiary; as of 2016, it was operating as part of Microsoft's Office Product Group. The company was a société à responsabilité limitée, or SARL, equivalent to an American limited liability company.

Skype, a voice over IP (VoIP) service, was first released in 2003 as a way to make free computer-to-computer calls, or reduced-rate calls from a computer to telephones. Support for paid services such as calling landline/mobile phones from Skype (formerly called SkypeOut), allowing landlines and mobile phones to call Skype (formerly called SkypeIn and now Skype Number), and voice messaging generated the majority of Skype's revenue.

eBay acquired Skype Technologies S.A. in September 2005 and in April 2009 announced plans to spin it off in a 2010 initial public offering (IPO). In September 2009, Silver Lake, Andreessen Horowitz, and the Canada Pension Plan Investment Board announced the acquisition of 65% of Skype for $1.9 billion from eBay, valuing the business at $2.75 billion. Skype was acquired by Microsoft in May 2011 for $8.5 billion (~$12 billion in 2025).

As of 2010, Skype was available in 27 languages and had 660 million worldwide users, an average of over 100 million active each month, and had faced challenges to its intellectual property amid political concerns by governments wishing to control telecommunications systems within their borders.

In February 2025, Microsoft announced the shutdown of Skype on 5 May 2025, with the company being dissolved along with it.

== History ==
Skype was founded in 2003 by Janus Friis from Denmark and Niklas Zennström from Sweden, having its headquarters in Luxembourg with offices now in Berlin, Frankfurt, Tallinn, Tartu, Stockholm, London, Palo Alto, Prague, and Redmond, Washington.

The Skype software was originally developed by Estonians Ahti Heinla, Priit Kasesalu, and Jaan Tallinn, who together with Janus Friis and Niklas Zennström were also behind the peer-to-peer file sharing software Kazaa. In April 2003, Skype.com and Skype.net domain names were registered. In August 2003, the first public beta version was released.

One of the initial names for the project was "Sky peer-to-peer", which was then abbreviated to "Skyper". However, some of the domain names associated with "Skyper" were already taken. Dropping the final "r" left the current title "Skype", for which domain names were available.

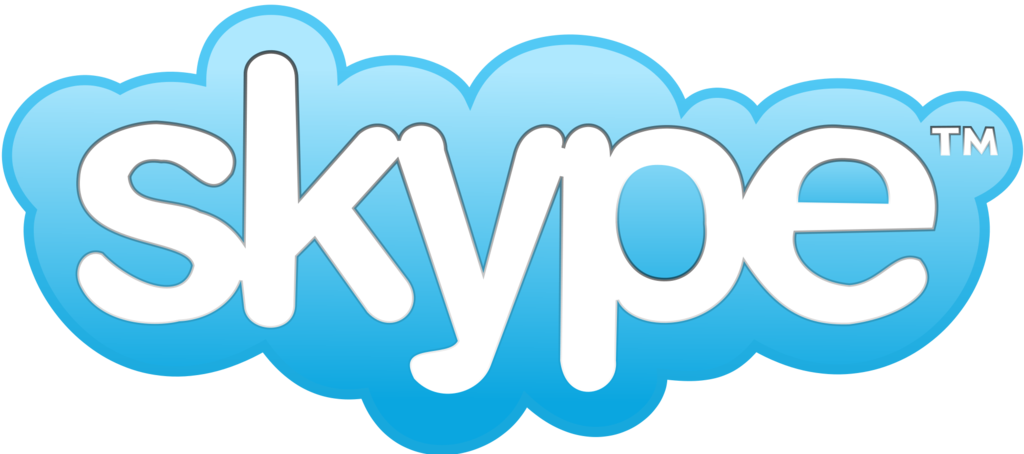
The Skype logo from 2006 to 2012

In September 2005, SkypeOut was banned in China. In October of the same year, eBay purchased Skype for $2.6 billion. (In 2011, the Ars Technica estimated the purchase price at $3.1 billion, not $2.6 billion.) In December 2005, videotelephony was introduced.

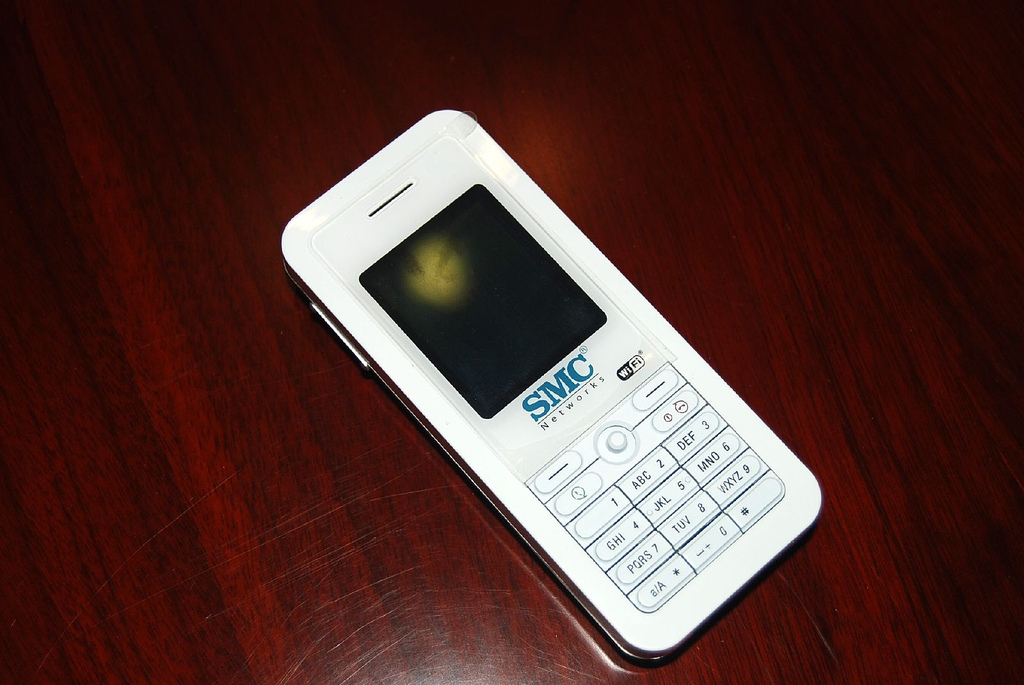
A Skype phone manufactured by SMC Networks (c. 2006)

In April 2006, the number of registered users reached 100 million. In October 2006, Skype 2.0 for Mac was released, the first full release of Skype with video for Macintosh, and in December, Skype announced a new pricing structure, with connection fees for all SkypeOut calls. Skype 3.0 for Windows was released.

In 2006, a feature called "Skypecasting" was introduced as a beta. It allowed recordings of Skype voice over IP voice calls and teleconferences to be used as podcasts. Skypecasting remained in beta until it was discontinued on 1 September 2008. Skypecasts hosted public conference calls for up to 100 people at a time. Unlike ordinary Skype p2p conference calls, Skypecasts supported moderation features suitable for panel discussions, lectures, and town hall forums. Skype operated a directory of public Skypecasts.

Throughout 2007, updates (3.1, 3.2, and 3.5) added new features including Skype Find, Skype Prime, Send Money (which allowed users to send money via PayPal from one Skype user to another), video in mood, inclusion of video content in chat, call transfer to another person or a group, and auto-redial. Skype 2.7.0.49 (beta) for Mac OS X released adding availability of contacts in the Mac Address Book to the Skype contact list, auto redial, contact groups, public chat creation, and an in-window volume slider in the call window. During several days in August, Skype users were unable to connect to full Skype network in many countries because of a Skype system-wide crash which was the result of exceptional number of logins after a Windows patch reboot ("Patch Tuesday"). In November, there was controversy when it was announced that users allocated certain London 020 numbers (specifically those beginning '7870') would lose them, after negotiations with the provider of this batch of numbers broke down.

By early 2008, the tumultuous ownership relations between the founders and eBay had resulted in significant leadership churn, with a succession of Skype presidents including Niklas Zennström, Rajiv Dutta, Alex Kazim, Niklas Zennström (again), and Henry Gomez, all holding that title at various points between 2005 and 2007. The business had failed to meet certain earn-out targets, growth was decelerating, product development had slowed significantly, and in October 2007 eBay took a $1.4 billion 'impairment' on the value of Skype, admitting it had overpaid, and now valuing the company at about $2.7 billion.

In October 2008, analysis revealed TOM-skype — the Chinese version of Skype run by TOM Online — sent content of text messages and encryption keys to monitoring servers.

=== Two original founders depart, new CEO, and the eBay years ===
For the six months after the departure of Zennström and Friis, Michael van Swaaij led the company as interim CEO, until the appointment of Josh Silverman in February 2008. Silverman was "widely viewed as bringing in stability to Skype after a tumultuous phase that followed the exit of the two Skype co-founders". Under Silverman's two-and-a-half-year tenure, the company focused its product efforts around video calling, ubiquity (gaining high penetration on smartphones, PCs, TVs, and consumer-electronic devices), building tailored offerings for enterprise customers, and diversifying revenue through subscriptions, premium accounts, and advertising.

In advancing this strategy, Skype released many new products, substantially revamping its flagship Windows software (3.8 -> 4.0), and its macOS and Linux software; while introducing new software products for smartphones, and consumer electronics. In 2009, Skype 4.0 was released, featuring full-screen high-quality video calling. the Linux client was updated, and an iPhone application was launched which topped the charts with over 1M downloads in its first two days. Skype also announced the launch of its software for the Android platform.

During this period, Skype also discontinued lesser-used services such as support for the "Skype Me" presence indicator, which meant that a user was interested in receiving Skype calls from a non-contact. Skype also discontinued its SkypeCast service without explanation and added internal monthly and daily usage caps on their SkypeOut subscriptions, which had been advertised as "unlimited". Skype also discontinued its "dragonfly" feature, a community-generated yellow-pages product, and other features which were deemed to be under-performing or a distraction to management. Many users and observers had commented on the high rate of dropped calls and the difficulty reconnecting dropped calls. Updates including versions for the Sony PSP handheld video game console, version 2.0 for Linux with support for video-conferencing.

As part of its efforts to diversify revenues, Skype launched in April 2008 Skype for SIP, a service aimed at business users. At that time around 35 per cent of Skype's users were business users. In targeted premium products to consumers, Skype launched new monthly premium subscriptions products in May 2010.

Marketing efforts were also revamped, with a particular focus on innovative partnerships with TV broadcasters to integrate Skype into their programming. The Oprah Winfrey Show began using Skype regularly to host video calls between Winfrey and her viewers at home, culminating in a show dedicated exclusively to the wonders of Skype ("where the Skype are You", aired first in May 2009). Skype also became commonly used by network news stations around the world, as a cost-effective replacement for sending satellite trucks, and enabling fast response from citizen journalists. Skype was also integrated into scripted TV programming, such as Californication; and in the seventh season of the U.S. syndicated version of the British game show Who Wants To Be a Millionaire in a new Ask the Expert video chat lifeline.

These efforts led to accelerating growth of Skype's Connected Users and Paying Users and by 2009 Skype was adding about 380,000 new users each day. By the end of 2009 Skype was generating around US$740 million in revenue.

In January 2010, Josh Silverman was recognized for his accomplishments at Skype by being named First Runner Up in the TechCrunch "Crunchies" award for "Best CEO", beaten only by Mark Pincus of Zynga.

=== Independence and Silver Lake ===
Building on the revitalization which had begun in 2008, eBay announced, in April 2009, plans to spin off Skype through an initial public offering in 2010. In August, Joltid, Ltd. filed a motion with the U.S. Securities and Exchange Commission, seeking to terminate a licensing agreement with eBay which allowed eBay (and therefore Skype) to use the peer-to-peer communications technology on which Skype is based. If successful, this could have caused a shutdown of Skype as it existed, and made an IPO challenging to execute. In September, eBay announced the sale of 65 per cent of Skype to a consortium of Index Ventures and Silver Lake Partners. Early in September, Skype shut down the Extras developer program. In November, Skype settled the Joltid litigation and acquired all Skype technology in exchange for equity in the company and eBay completed the sale of 70% of Skype to a consortium comprising Silver Lake Partners, Joltid, CPPIB, and Andreessen Horowitz for approximately $2 billion, valuing the entire business at US$2.75 billion.

In May 2010, Skype 5.0 beta was released, with a capacity to support group video calls involving up to four participants. Also in May, Skype released an updated client for the Apple iPhone that allowed Skype calls to be made over a 3G network. Originally, a 3G call subscription plan was to be instituted in 2011, but Skype eventually dropped the plan. Rounding out its ubiquity push, Skype also announced deep integration of Skype software into the IP-connected TVs from Panasonic, Samsung, and Sony.

In June 2010, following the rapid departure of Daniel Berg, the chief technology officer, and then chief development officer Madhu Yarlagadda, Mark Gillett, an operating partner at Silver Lake Partners, assumed the role of chief development officer, taking responsibility for development of Skype's client software, cloud services, and product management following a period of several months working closely with Joshua Silverman to drive the transformation of the business, and the acceleration of cross-platform and mobile product delivery.

With its newfound independence and under ownership, Skype's growth accelerated and by 2010, Telegeography estimated that Skype accounted for 25 per cent of the world's international calling minutes. According to their research, the overall international calling market grew a tepid 5 to 6 per cent annually in 2010. "Skype, however, has seen a huge uptick in growth, particularly in the last two years."

On 9 August 2010, Skype filed with the United States Securities and Exchange Commission (SEC) to raise up to US$100 million in an initial public offering. Sources reported that the company expected to raise at least US$1 billion. In October 2010, Skype announced the appointment of Tony Bates as CEO; Bates was a senior VP at Cisco and was responsible for its multibillion-dollar enterprise, commercial, and small business division. On 14 October 2010, Skype 5.0 for Windows was released with a number of improvements and feature additions, including a Facebook tab to allow users to SMS, chat with, or call their Facebook friends via Skype from the News Feed. The "Search for Skype Users" option was omitted from this version.

On 14 January 2011, Skype acquired Qik, a mobile video-sharing platform. In March 2011, Skype named Jonathan Chadwick as its new chief financial officer and confirmed that Mark Gillett would serve full-time as chief development and operating officer following the departure of chief financial and administrative officer Adrian Dillon.

=== Microsoft subsidiary (2011–2025) ===
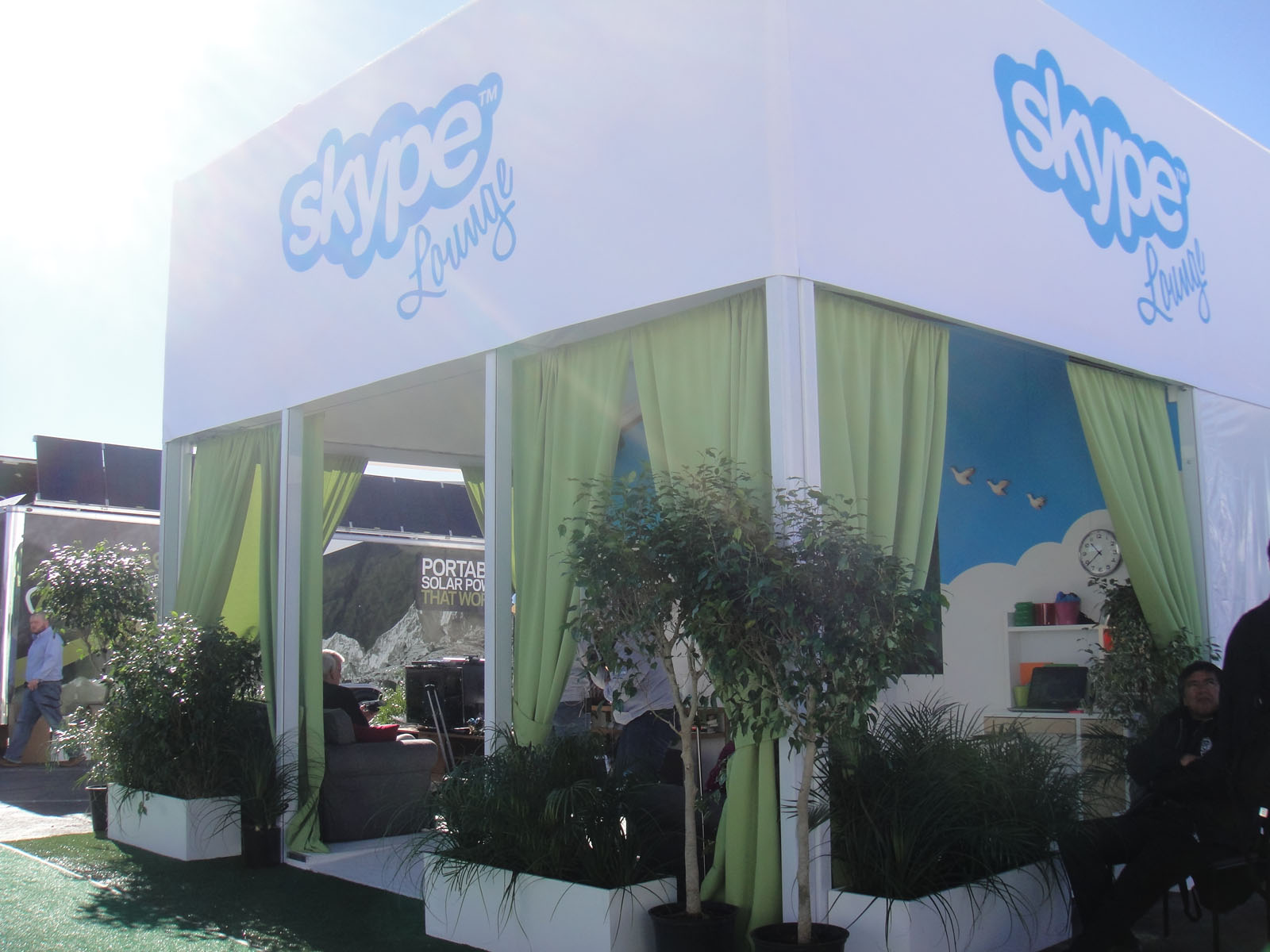
Skype lounge at CES 2012

On 10 May 2011, Microsoft announced it had agreed to acquire Skype for $8.5 billion. This marked a 300% increase in value for the company in the three years since the eBay write-down in October 2007. This constitutes Microsoft's second largest acquisition to date. It was announced that Skype would become a division within Microsoft, with Skype's former CEO Tony Bates —now its president— reporting to Microsoft CEO Steve Ballmer. The price Microsoft agreed to pay for the company is 32 times Skype's operating profits. According to the Financial Times this raises fears of a new "tech bubble". Ars Technica and the BBC have questioned the value for Microsoft in the purchase. Microsoft's acquisition of Skype got EU approval on 7 October 2011.

In October 2012, one year after the closure of the Skype acquisition, the newly formed Skype Division took responsibility for Microsoft's other VoIP and Unified Communications product Microsoft Lync.

On 11 July 2013, Microsoft's then-CEO Steve Ballmer announced a reorganization of Microsoft along functional lines and with four engineering groups each led by a senior leader. Microsoft's new Applications and Services Group, led by executive vice president Qi Lu was to include Skype along with Bing and Microsoft Office. Following a period where the strategy for the Skype business as a part of the broader Microsoft portfolios including Office 365 was established, and Skype's share of the international communications market rose to 36 percent (over 214 billion minutes), Mark Gillett announced that he would be leaving Microsoft to return to Silver Lake.

Skype Logo 2019-2025

In September 2016, after Qi Lu stepped down from Microsoft, Skype and Office became part of the Office Product Group, led by Rajesh Jha. The other part of the former Apps and Services Group (which includes Bing) became part of a new AI and Research Group.

Between 2020 and 2023, Skype lost daily users, mainly to its main competitor, Zoom. On 28 February 2025, Microsoft announced Skype's retirement on 5 May 2025, with Microsoft instead focusing on Microsoft Teams, its proprietary videoconferencing software.

== Palo Alto office ==
The Skype North American headquarters opened in early 2013, after the design was completed by San Francisco architect firm Blitz. Located in Palo Alto, California, the space is designed to encourage interaction and spontaneity, while also introducing a sense of humor into the workplace. Fake lawn, cushions that look like boulders, open spaces, and high ceilings accommodate 250 employees in a 5,000 square metres (54,000 ft^{2}) building. The Palo Alto headquarters also houses a games room complete with a pool table and table football machine. The office's silver LEED Silver certification means that it received between 50 and 59 points for its environmentally friendly construction.

== Legal issues ==
=== P2P licensing dispute lawsuit and IPO ===
In its 2008 Annual Report, eBay admitted to an ongoing dispute between it and Joltid Ltd. over the licensing of its peer-to-peer "Global Index" technology in its application. It announced that it terminated a standstill agreement, allowing either company to sue. On 1 April 2009, eBay filed with a UK court to settle the legal dispute. A few days later, eBay announced the planning of a public stock offering in 2010 to spin off Skype as a separate, publicly owned company. Some media outlets characterized the proposed sale and ongoing provision of Skype as being under threat because of the concurrent dispute.

On 1 September 2009, a group of investors led by Silver Lake bought 65% of Skype for $1.91 billion (~$2.78 billion in 2025). This prompted Joltid to countersue eBay on 17 September 2009.

Both settled the simultaneous suits in November, resulting in Joltid's part-ownership of the newly formed Skype Limited. The final holding share were with Silver Lake reducing their share to 56%, Joltid entered at 14%, and eBay retained 30%.

== Other intellectual property challenges ==
=== Streamcast lawsuit ===
StreamCast Networks filed a complaint in U.S. District Court in Los Angeles, alleging theft of its peer-to-peer technology and violation of the "Racketeer Influenced and Corrupt Organizations" statute. The complaint, titled; StreamCast Networks Inc v. Skype Technologies, S.A., was filed on 20 January 2006 in Federal Court in the Central District of California and assigned Case Number, 2:2006cv00391. The $4.1 billion lawsuit did not name Skype's parent company, eBay, when initially filed. Streamcast's lawsuit was subsequently amended on 22 May 2006 to include eBay and 21 other-party defendants.

In its lawsuit, Streamcast sought a worldwide injunction on the sale and marketing of eBay's Skype Internet voice communication products, as well as billions of dollars in unspecified damages. The lawsuit was finally dismissed in a decision filed on 19 January 2007.

=== IDT lawsuit ===
On 1 June 2006, Net2Phone (the Internet telephone unit of IDT Corp.) filed a lawsuit against eBay and Skype accusing the unit of infringing U.S. patent 6,108,704, which was granted in 2000. The lawsuit was settled between the parties in 2010.

=== GPL lawsuit ===
In July 2007 Skype was found by a German court to have violated the GNU General Public License in one of its for-sale products, the SMC WSKP100.

== Political issues ==
=== China 2005 ===
Skype was one of many companies (others include AOL, Microsoft, Yahoo, Cisco) which cooperate with the Chinese government in implementing a system of Internet censorship in mainland China. Critics of such policies argue that it is wrong for companies to profit from censorship and restrictions on freedom of the press and freedom of speech. Human rights advocates such as Human Rights Watch and media groups such as Reporters Without Borders speculate that if companies stopped contributing to the authorities' censorship efforts, the government could be pressured to change.

Niklas Zennström, then chief executive of Skype, told reporters that its joint venture partner in China was operated in compliance with domestic law. "TOM Online had implemented a text filter, which is what everyone else in that market is doing," said Zennström. "Those are the regulations," he said. "I may like or not like the laws and regulations to operate businesses in the UK or Germany or the US, but if I do business there I choose to comply with those laws and regulations. I can try to lobby to change them, but I need to comply with them. China in that way is not different."

=== France 2005 ===
In September 2005, the French Ministry of Research, acting on advice from the General Secretariat of National Defence, issued an official disapproval of the use of Skype in public research and higher education; some services are interpreting this decision as an outright ban. The exact reasons for the decision were not given.

=== United States, CALEA 2006 ===
In May 2006, the Federal Communications Commission (FCC) successfully applied the Communications Assistance for Law Enforcement Act to allow wiretapping on digital phone networks. Skype was not compliant with the Act, and stated that it does not plan to comply.

=== United States, Transparency, and PRISM 2013 ===
Starting in November 2010, Skype has been participating in a U.S. Government spy program titled PRISM, allowing the National Security Agency (NSA) unfettered access to people's chats and video and audio communications. However, it was not until February 2011 that the company was formally served with a directive to comply, signed by the attorney general.

In March 2013, the company issued transparency reports. confirming long held beliefs that Skype responds to requests from governments. Microsoft's General Counsel wrote to the US Attorney General, outlining the company's concerns in July 2013 in a blog from Brad Smith including a copy of the letter to the US attorney.

== See also ==
- List of Skype features
