= World-Wide Spectrum Efficiency =

Two industry "Pre-N" groups, TGnSync and the World-Wide Spectrum Efficiency (WWiSE), were formed, and each espoused a different approach to achieving next-generation Wi-Fi technologies. WWiSE, led by Airgo Networks, won the support of Texas Instruments, Broadcom, Conexant, STMicro and Motorola. WWiSE submitted its proposal to the IEEE 802.1n task group and the proposal was eventually merged with a proposal from TGnSync to produce the IEEE 802.1n wireless networking standard.
