= Charles Giancarlo =

American entrepreneur and investor

Charles Henry "Charlie" Giancarlo
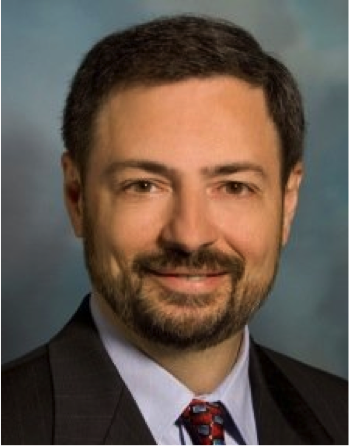
- Born: August 12, 1957 (age 69)
- Education: Brown University; University of California, Berkeley; Harvard University
- Occupation: Businessman
- Employer: Everpure
- Known for: Co-founder, Telecom Systems & Adaptive Corporation
- Title: Chairman & CEO, Everpure
- Spouse: married

Charles Henry "Charlie" Giancarlo (born 1957) is an American entrepreneur, executive and investor. He is the chairman and CEO of Everpure, formerly Pure Storage, a data storage and data management company. He is a former senior executive of Cisco Systems and Silver Lake Partners.

== Early life and education ==
Giancarlo was born in New Jersey in 1957 and is the oldest of four boys. He attended Englewood School for Boys and went on to Brown University, where he earned a Bachelor of Science in Engineering and a Bachelor of Arts in Classics, graduating magna cum laude. He later earned a master's degree in electrical engineering from the University of California, Berkeley followed by an MBA from Harvard University.

== Career ==
His first engineering role was at Siemens AG (division spun out later as Infineon), where he developed and patented the world's first functioning digital codec filter, a mixed-signal CMOS integrated circuit.

From 1984 through 1994, Giancarlo co-founded several technology startups. He began with O'Dowd Communications, which focused on building pre-ATM high-speed data switching equipment. In 1985, he founded Telecom Systems, which developed SONET-based cross-connect systems for telecommunications carriers. In 1988, he co-founded Adaptive, Inc. with Audrey MacLean. Reed Hastings' first job was at Adaptive. Giancarlo later served on the board of Netflix from 2007 to 2012, the company Hastings co-founded.

Giancarlo joined Cisco in 1994 when the company acquired Kalpana, an Ethernet switching company. He initially served as General Manager of the Ethernet Switching product line. He later became Cisco's first vice president of corporate and business development and developed the company's mergers and acquisitions strategy and practice. In 1999, he took responsibility for the commercial line of business at Cisco. He became chief technical officer in 2004 and chief development officer later that year. During his Cisco tenure, he was responsible for the creation and development of many of Cisco's technologies, including Ethernet switching, Wi-Fi, Internet security, IP Telephony, and telepresence. Giancarlo guided Cisco's entry into markets such as the small and medium business and consumer markets after acquiring Linksys, Scientific Atlanta, and WebEx. Although some analysts thought he might become chief executive after John T. Chambers, Giancarlo resigned from Cisco in December 2007.

In January 2008, he became a managing director and operating partner at the private equity firm Silver Lake Partners. After the appointment of Kevin J. Kennedy as CEO, he became chairman of the board at Avaya until 2015, while continuing to serve at Silver Lake. He was president and CEO of Avaya from June 2008 (replacing Louis D'Ambrosio) through December 2008. Giancarlo founded ItsOn in 2009, and was a founding investor at other ventures, including Equinix, Blue Jeans Networks, Coraid, Big Switch Networks, Avi Networks, Soraa, Enlighted, Attivo, Exablox, Formation Data, LensVector, NetSpeed, and Virtual Instruments.

In August 2017, it was announced that he would replace Scott Dietzen as CEO of Pure Storage (now known as Everpure).

In 2020, Giancarlo co-founded The Digital Dollar Project. He has served on the boards of companies such as Accenture, Arista Networks, Tintri, ServiceNow, and Vectra Networks Inc.

== Philanthropy ==
Brown University, in 2001, named the Charles H. Giancarlo Engineering Laboratories building in his honor. The 16,000-square-foot facility serves as a prominent entrance to the University's engineering and physics complex and includes collaborative spaces that connect adjacent engineering facilities.

Giancarlo also supported the creation of a student-designed public artwork for the plaza outside Brown's Engineering Research Center. In 2022, he funded a project that challenged engineering students to design and install an interactive sundial. The winning design, a Möbius strip-shaped sundial titled Infinite Possibility, tracks the position of the noontime sun throughout the year and was intended to reflect both the technical rigor and creativity of engineering.

Charles Giancarlo, who co-chaired the Light the Way campaign launched by the University of California, Berkeley, in 2020, concluded the program after raising more than $7 billion in philanthropic support for college student opportunities. Designed by the architectural firm Skidmore, Owings & Merrill, the Engineering Center at the UC Berkeley College of Engineering, which houses the Giancarlo Family Gallery, includes indoor and outdoor spaces for group study, student organizations, team projects, and entrepreneurship-related activities.

Business positions
Preceded by Mario Mazzola	EVP, Chief Development Officer; Cisco; 1993–2007	Succeeded by None
Preceded by Louis D'Ambrosio	President & CEO; Avaya; 2008–2009	Succeeded by Kevin J. Kennedy
Preceded by John R. Joyce	Managing Director, Head of Value Creation; Silver Lake Partners; 2007–2013	Succeeded by Mark Gillett
Preceded by Scott Dietzen	CEO; Pure Storage; 2017–current	Succeeded by None
