= Kalpana, Inc. =

American computer network company (1990–1994)

- Company type: Division
- Industry: Computer networking
- Founded: 1990; 36 years ago in Sunnyvale, California, U.S.
- Founder: Vinod Bhardwaj, Larry Blair
- Defunct: 1994; 32 years ago
- Fate: Acquired by Cisco Systems in 1994
- Headquarters: San Jose, California
- Parent: Cisco Systems

Kalpana, Inc., was an American computer-networking equipment manufacturer located in Sunnyvale, California, which operated during the early 1990s in Silicon Valley. They were the manufacturer of the first Ethernet switch. Cisco Systems acquired Kalpana in 1994.

== History ==
Its co-founders, Vinod Bhardwaj, an entrepreneur of Indian origin, and Larry Blair named the company after Bhardwaj's wife, Kalpana, whose name means "imagination" in Sanskrit. Charles Giancarlo was Kalpana's vice president of products and corporate development, became its General Manager, and went on to roles at Cisco Systems and Silver Lake Partners.

In 1990, Kalpana introduced the first multiport Ethernet switch, its seven-port EtherSwitch. The invention of Ethernet switching made Ethernet networks faster, cheaper, and easier to manage. Multi-port network switches became common, gradually replacing Ethernet hubs for almost all applications, and enabled an easy transition to 100-megabit Fast Ethernet and later Gigabit Ethernet. Kalpana also invented EtherChannel, which provides higher inter-switch bandwidth by running several links in parallel. This innovation, more generally called link aggregation, was also widely adopted throughout the industry. Kalpana also invented the Virtual LAN concept as closed broadcast domains, which was later replaced by 802.1Q.

Cisco Systems acquired Kalpana in 1994.

== Product ==
Kalpana produced two models of Ethernet switch, the EPS-700 and the EPS-1500.

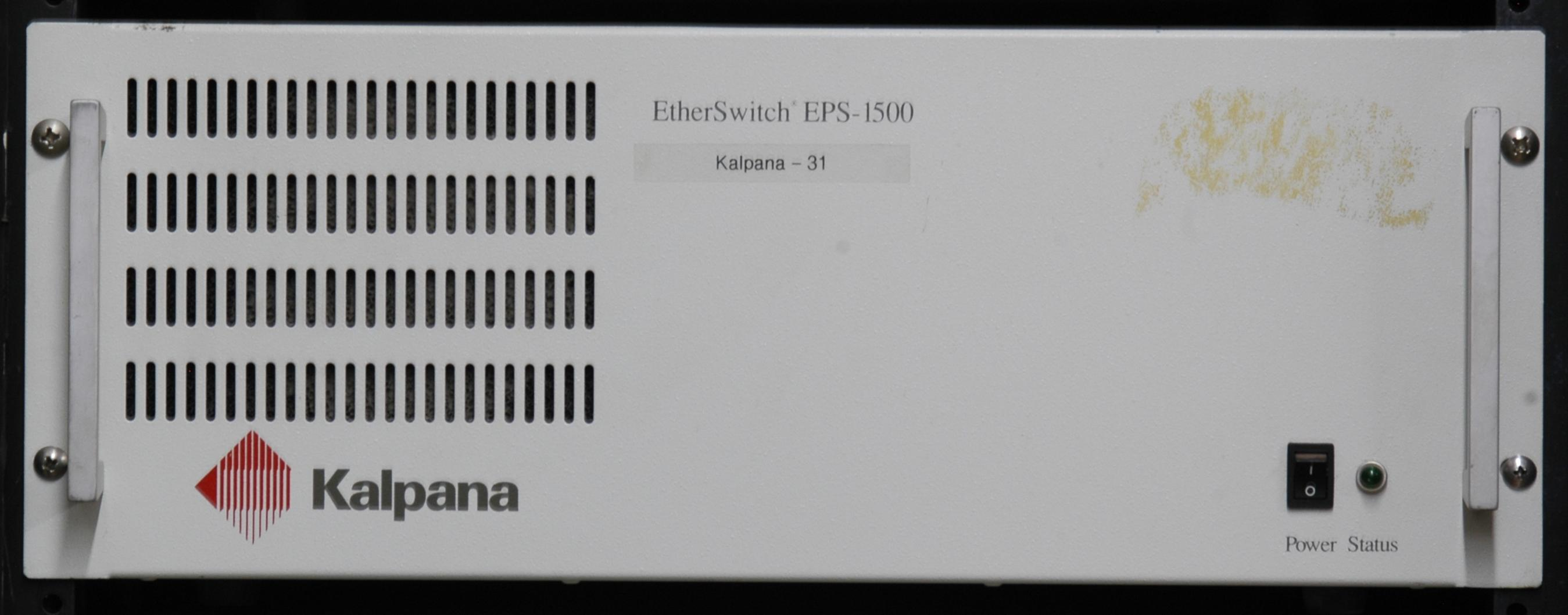
Kalpana EtherSwitch EPS-1500, one of the first Ethernet switches.

Kalpana EtherSwitch specifications
	EPS-700	EPS-1500
max. Ports	7× AUI 10 Mbit/s	15× AUI 10 Mbit/s
Forwarding method	Cut-through switching	
Throughput	30 Mbit/s	70 Mbit/s
Latency	40 μs	
Buffer	256 packets	

== See also ==
- List of acquisitions by Cisco
