= Marilù Capparelli =

Italian lawyer

Marilù Capparelli is an Italian lawyer who serves as a director of Google's legal department in EMEA. She has been in Google's Legal Affairs since 2009. Capparelli has been a Director of Legal & Public Policy Affairs at eBay, PayPal and Skype Technologies.

== Early life and education ==
Capparelli speaks four languages fluently and she has a PhD from the University of Bologna where she was a visiting lecturer in the Civil Law Department.

== Other activities ==
=== Corporate boards ===
- Tod's, Independent Member of the Board of Directors
- RCS MediaGroup, Independent Member of the Board of Directors (2016–2022)

=== Non-profit organizations ===
- Veneranda Fabbrica del Duomo di Milano, Member of the advisory board (since 2022)
