= Gregory Raleigh =

Gregory G. Raleigh
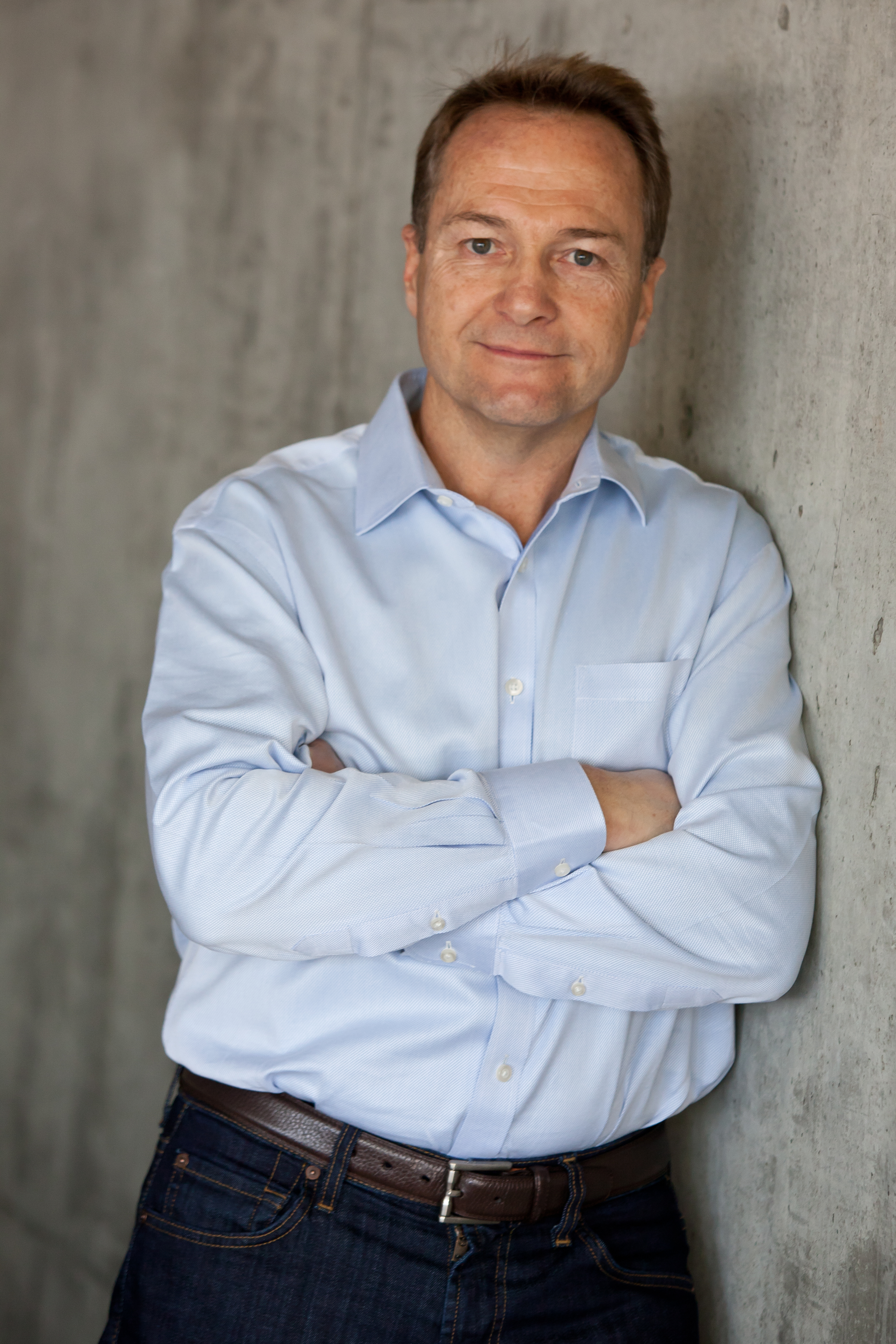
- Born: 1961 (age 64–65); Orange, California, U.S.
- Education: Stanford University, California Polytechnic State University
- Known for: Inventor of the MIMO technology used in Wi-Fi, 4G and 5G wireless standards
- Scientific career
- Fields: Telecommunications

Gregory “Greg” Raleigh (born 1961 in Orange, California), is an American radio scientist, inventor, and entrepreneur who has made contributions in the fields of wireless communication, information theory, mobile operating systems, medical devices, and network virtualization. His discoveries and inventions include the first wireless communication channel model to accurately predict the performance of advanced antenna systems, the MIMO-OFDM technology used in contemporary Wi-Fi and 4G wireless networks and devices, higher accuracy radiation beam therapy for cancer treatment, improved 3D surgery imaging, and a cloud-based Network Functions Virtualization platform for mobile network operators that enables users to customize and modify their smartphone services.

== Biography ==
Raleigh received a B.S.E.E. degree from the California Polytechnic State University, an M.S.E.E. degree from Stanford University, and a Ph.D. from Stanford University. He joined Watkins-Johnson Company in 1984 as a Radio Engineer and rose to Chief Scientist and Vice President of Research and Development. Raleigh subsequently co-founded five companies: Clarity Wireless, Airgo Networks, Headwater Research, ItsOn, and Chilko Capital.

In wireless communications, Raleigh developed a comprehensive and precise channel model that works with multiple antennas. He employed the model to develop smart antenna signal processing techniques for rapid fading, multipath propagation, and frequency-division duplex environments. As a result of this research, Raleigh found that multipath propagation could be exploited to greatly increase the capacity of wireless communications, enabling data rates competitive with wire-based networks. In a paper prepared for the 1996 GLOBECOM conference in London, Raleigh presented the first rigorous mathematical proof that in the presence of naturally occurring multipath propagation multiple antennas may be used with special signal processing techniques to transmit multiple data streams at the same time on the same frequency, multiplying the information-carrying capacity (data rate) of wireless links. From the time of Guglielmo Marconi, multipath propagation had always been treated as a problem to be overcome. The discovery that multipath can be harnessed to increase performance reversed a century of radio engineering practice. In subsequent papers, Raleigh proposed a series of enhancements including the use of OFDM with MIMO and techniques for space-frequency coding, space-frequency-time channel estimation, and MIMO synchronization. These inventions were incorporated into the LTE, WiMAX, 802.11n and 802.11ac standards.

Raleigh, V.K. Jones, and Michael Pollack founded Clarity Wireless in 1996. Clarity built a MIMO demonstration link and developed a related technology, vector orthogonal frequency-division multiplexing (V-OFDM). Clarity Wireless was acquired by Cisco Systems in 1998. Raleigh, Jones, and David Johnson founded Airgo Networks in 2001 to develop MIMO-OFDM chipsets for wireless LANs. Airgo Networks proposed MIMO as the best technology for meeting the performance goals of next-generation wireless LANs and contributed to the development of the IEEE 802.11n standard. The company began shipping the world's first MIMO-OFDM chipsets in 2003. While at Airgo Networks, Raleigh was named to Network World's “The 50 most powerful people in networking.” Airgo Networks was purchased by Qualcomm in 2006.

Raleigh co-founded the technology innovation firm Headwater Research in late 2008 with Charles Giancarlo and became Lead Director of its board. Raleigh's inventions at Headwater have spanned the wireless and medical device fields. The inventions include mobile device operating system enhancements, improvements to radiation beam therapy for cancer treatment, enhanced 3-D imaging systems for surgery, and cloud-based network function virtualization (NFV) advances. Mobile OS controls and NFV are now widely deployed.

In late 2009, Raleigh and Giancarlo spun out ItsOn to license and commercialize wireless technology, with Raleigh serving as the firm's first CEO. ItsOn developed a cloud-based network function virtualization (NFV) platform that enables operators to implement intelligent, user context-aware policies including the ability for users to customize and manage their mobile phone services. ItsOn's service, called Zact, launched in May 2013.

Raleigh holds more than 200 US patents and over 150 international patents in the fields of radio communications, medical devices, mobile device operating systems, radar systems, and mobile network function virtualization.
