= SOHOware Incorporated =

- Type: Private
- Industry: Consumer electronics
- Founded: September 11, 1990; 36 years ago
- Headquarters: Sunnyvale, California, United States
- Area served: Worldwide
- Key people: Chin-Tu Wu Owner, President; Ashok Kumar (Chief Marketing Officer and Vice President of Business Development); Stephen Sun Chiao Ph.D. Technical Advisor; Dhadesugoor R. Vaman Technical Advisor
- Products: Ethernet hubs wireless mesh routers wireless LANs
- Revenue: $12,500,000 – $15,000,000 (2005)
- Number of employees: 10 to 19 (2005)
- Website: www.sohoware.com

SOHOware Incorporated is an American companythat produces computer networking devices. SOHOware, Inc. was founded in 1990 as NDC Communications, changing its name to SOHOware in March 2000. It produces consumer and commercial products, including wireless LANs, ethernet hubs, wireless mesh networks, wireless hotspots, and firewall residential gateways.

== History ==
=== NDC Communications ===
The business dates from 1990 and traded for its first decade as NDC Communications, Inc. Its early catalogue was directed at inexpensive local area network equipment for households and small offices. Filings with the United States Patent and Trademark Office outline the shape of that range: an adapter name, INSTANT-LINK, was lodged in March 1994, and a group of applications followed in May 1996 covering hubs, print servers, fax servers, serial gateways and wireless adapters under the GENIE and MAGICWAVE labels. The word SOHOWARE was among the May 1996 filings, claimed for integrated networking hardware, and the firm added SOHOPOWER in September 1996, PLUG-N-SWITCH in June 1998, and CABLEFREE, covering wireless LAN cards and access points, in July 1998.

The wording INSTANTWAVE occurs twice in the register. NDC Communications applied for it in May 1996, and the Taiwanese firm National Datacomm Corporation, holder of the NDC mark filed in July 1990, lodged an application for the same wording under a later serial number.

Bundled kits aimed at first-time network builders were a mainstay of the line. In September 1998 PC Magazine assessed two of them, the NDC SOHOware Network PCI Starter Kit and the NDC SOHOware Network Fast Ethernet Starter Kit.

=== Change of name ===
On March 28, 2000, NDC Communications, at that point based in Santa Clara, California, said it would take SOHOware as its corporate name and concentrate its engineering on wireless networking inside the home. The announcement described the brand as roughly four years old. Chin-Tu ("C. T.") Wu, president and chief executive, set out a line-up centred on the CableFREE family, which carried traffic from a cable modem or DSL modem over radio to devices around a dwelling, together with a residential gateway and planned DOCSIS cable and telephone-wiring products. The company added that it was moving into larger premises in expectation of more than tripling its headcount inside two years.

The firm afterwards gave Sunnyvale, California as its base, presented its sales coverage as international, and remained privately held. A business directory recorded turnover of between $12.5 million and $15 million and a payroll of 10 to 19 for 2005.

=== Consumer wireless equipment ===
SOHOware presented the NetBlaster II in November 2000, an 11 Mbit/s wireless system offered to home and small-office buyers who wanted to spread a broadband connection around a building without laying further cable. Deliveries were set for February 2001.

The range was examined by the trade press through 2001. Reviewing the NCP600 access point for PracticallyNetworked in March 2001, Tim Higgins judged its setup the quickest he had met among 802.11b products, since the unit took its settings from a SOHOware client adapter instead of requiring separate administration. He also recorded that the access point could neither list attached stations nor filter by MAC address, and that measured throughput dropped from about 4.5 Mbit/s to about 2.2 Mbit/s once standard WEP encryption was in use. Neoseeker looked at the CableFREE NetBlaster II bundle, made up of a wireless hub and a PCI adapter, in June 2001.

A second strand was BroadGuard, a security-oriented router for cable and DSL lines. Neoseeker covered it in March 2001, describing hardware firewall and VPN functions while also relaying readers' accounts of unreliable connections.

=== Broadband access equipment ===
Multichannel News reported in May 2002 that SOHOware was working on a single unit combining a DOCSIS 1.1 modem with a router, built to a modular pattern. Charles Tucker, the company's product marketing manager, said the arrangement was meant to let subscribers gain voice or video functions later without replacing the whole device, and he linked the effort to rising interest in home networking among cable operators that year. Field trials were planned for the second half of 2002 and general availability for around the turn of 2003.

=== MIMO and enterprise systems ===
Airgo Networks said in June 2004 that four manufacturers were bringing the first products based on its True MIMO chipset to market; SOHOware was named alongside Taiyo Yuden, Askey and Planex, and further makers were expected to follow by early 2005.

The chipset also carried the company towards institutional buyers. In May 2005 SOHOware said it was fitting Airgo silicon into its AeroGuard appliances, which were credited with roughly 40 Mbit/s in practical use and carried WLAN switch software for setting security policy centrally. The units could also bridge to vehicles, so that officers obtained a data link without connecting by hand; International Police Technologies of Tulsa, Oklahoma, was to resell them for surveillance duties.

When Airgo announced a third-generation chipset in September 2005, rated at a nominal ceiling of 240 Mbit/s and measured in the company's own tests at about 120 Mbit/s, SOHOware appeared among the firms already shipping earlier versions, together with Belkin, Buffalo, Linksys, Netgear, Planex, Samsung and Smartvue. Sampling was under way with selected partners, and commercial supply was expected late in the fourth quarter of 2005.

SOHOware subsequently offered AeroMesh, a wireless mesh system covering indoor and outdoor sites from one management appliance. The company presented it for voice over Wi-Fi, IP video surveillance and fixed–mobile convergence work, with further applications in healthcare, RFID, retail point of sale and location services, and said the nodes distributed layer 3 routing among themselves and would interoperate with 802.11n and WiMAX. Mike Mo, vice-president of engineering, and Ashok Kumar, chief marketing officer and vice-president of business development, spoke for the launch, which quoted list prices of $3,900 for the WMS4500 outdoor node, $1,495 for the WMS4300 in-building node and $7,500 for the WMS8000-NMS management appliance. The same announcement referred to an earlier indoor MIMO mesh built on Airgo technology, by then acquired by Qualcomm.

== Products ==
The company's consumer and small-business catalogue has covered Ethernet adapters, hubs and starter kits, wireless LAN adapters and access points sold as CableFREE and NetBlaster, and BroadGuard firewall residential gateways for cable and DSL service. The AeroGuard appliances and the AeroMesh system form the enterprise and public-safety end of the range.

== Partnerships ==
SOHOware claimed strategic partnerships with Intel, Comcast, Cox, and others. In August 2004, Airgo Networks first announced that they would be partnering with SOHOware, among others. September 2005, it was announced that Airgo Networks would be shipping their Wi-Fi chips with network products by several companies, which included SOHOware.
