= Operating partner =

Title in investment firms

An operating partner is a title used by venture capital (VC) and private equity (PE) firms to describe a role dedicated to working with privately held companies to increase value. The role was created by large-capitalization private equity groups when the importance of driving corporate change to add value increased as sellers became more sophisticated and financial engineering less central to private equity investments in the 2000s. Firms with operating partners argue that value creation potential is better achieved by a fully dedicated partner than relying solely upon external consultants. The operating partner role has evolved into a full-time position drawing a combination of salary, performance bonus, and carried interest similar to an investment partner.

== Definition ==
Operating partners are proven business leaders, functioning as either generalists or specialists, and have successful track records of creating value in operating companies. They are usually more capable of developing strategies and leadership teams than a deal-oriented partner. Most travel often to engage with portfolio companies and are expected to spend time leveraging their professional networks to improve portfolio company value. They are usually former CEOs, COOs, CFOs, chief revenue officers, management consultants, or some combination with market knowledge of PE, such as deal structuring, in the investment firm's target industries. They typically focus on due diligence, strategic planning, commercial growth, operational efficiency, and financial controls. Operating partners use their skills and experience to improve portfolio companies.

== Role and Responsibilities ==
The role of an operating partner can span the full investment cycle from due diligence to post-transaction integration through to a liquidity event or full exit event. Operating partners are deployed by investors and boards as a catalyst for change, as coaches or mentors, and in some cases, to serve as "sparring partners" for management. Operating partners may manage short- to medium-term as well as long-term operational improvement programs for portfolio companies. They may also support management in day-to-day operations, as interim management, as board members or observers, and/or as advisors.

The role of an operating partner should not be confused with the role of a venture partner or an entrepreneur-in-residence. A venture partner is a non-salaried external resource who is expected to source deals and play a significant role in a few or more companies over the life of a fund usually receiving salary and equity interest directly from the target company. An entrepreneur-in-residence (EIR) is similar to a venture partner, but works on only a single company and typically steps into the company as the full-time CEO, CFO, or other c-level position.

== Value ==
All VC and PE firms seek to maximize the value of their investment. In recent years, the industry has experienced increased pressure to drive operational value creation. In other words, shifting focus from leverage and multiples arbitrage to increasing the fundamental operational, commercial, and financial performance of their portfolio companies. As a result, operating improvement must translate into increased enterprise value to yield higher investment returns. Hence the new partnership triad between general partners, limited partners, and operating partners.

== Notable Operating Partners ==
While some high-level executives may be appointed as operating partners, they often function more like senior advisors.

- Charles Giancarlo was appointed as managing director and operating partner at Silver Lake Partners following his departure from Cisco Systems where he was EVP, chief development officer, and president of Linksys.
- Richard Baker was hired as operating partner at Advent International having previously served as CEO at Boots plc and COO at Asda.
- Mark Gillett was appointed as managing director and operating partner at Silver Lake Partners following his departure from Microsoft where he was a corporate VP and responsible for product, engineering, and operations at Skype.
- Thomas Ryan was hired as operating partner at Advent International, which he joined after stepping down as president and CEO of CVS Health.
- Bob Swan served as an operating partner at General Atlantic prior to assuming the CEO role at Intel. Later, he joined Andreessen Horowitz as operating partner.
- Gary M. Reiner joined General Atlantic as operating partner in 2010.
- Jim Hinton, former CEO of Baylor Scott & White Health, joined Welsh, Carson, Anderson & Stowe as operating partner in 2022.
- Ajey Gore, former Group CTO of Gojek joined Sequoia Capital, India and SEA as operating partner, Technology in 2020.
