= Lou D'Ambrosio =

American business executive

- Born: Louis J. D'Ambrosio
- Education: Pennsylvania State University; Harvard Business School
- Employers: IBM; Avaya; Sears Holdings

Louis J. D'Ambrosio is an American business executive and a partner at Goldman Sachs. He is the former CEO of Sears Holding Corporation and Avaya, and he also served as executive chairman of Sensus. D'Ambrosio also worked at IBM for 16 years and served on its worldwide management committee.

== Early life and education ==
D'Ambrosio earned his Bachelor of Science degree from Pennsylvania State University (summa cum laude and Valedictorian) in 1986 and received his MBA from Harvard Business School.

== Career ==
D'Ambrosio joined IBM after college, working there for sixteen years. During his time at IBM, D'Ambrosio held various leadership roles in IBM Global Services, Software, and sales and marketing, including leading the company's worldwide strategy for IBM Global Service and field operations for IBM software. He led a vertical business unit in Asia Pacific and was a member of IBM's worldwide management committee. When he left the company in August 2002, he was responsible for worldwide sales and marketing for IBM's $12 billion software group.

D'Ambrosio joined Avaya in 2002 as vice president for services and by July 2006, he became president and chief executive officer. He had been president of global sales and marketing at Avaya, and prior to that had been in charge of Avaya's $2 billion global services business unit, including network consulting, integration, maintenance and managed services. His work turned Avaya into one of the leading companies in the IP Telephony market. His leadership also saw Avaya transition from selling hardware to selling software as the company continued to grow in value. Additionally, during his tenure as CEO, he took Avaya private, delivering attractive returns to its shareholders.

In February 2011, Sears Holdings named D'Ambrosio chief executive officer and president after a 3 year long search to find a new CEO, for the six months prior to his election as CEO, he worked on the company's board of directors. He had worked as a consultant to Sears' board for the previous six months. D'Ambrosio was brought to Sears with the hope that he would be able to reverse the company's declining public image and sales, restoring the store to prior relevance which had faded since the adoption of online shopping. Prior to his hire, the company suffered from consistent declines in both sales and its stock valuation, mostly due to the ongoing macroeconomic environment, as well as delays with the new Kenmore product line. On January 7, 2013, it was announced that he would step down at the end of its fiscal year on February 2, 2013 due to family health matters.

On August 19, 2013, it was announced he would be chairman of the board for Sensus, based in Raleigh, North Carolina. After serving as executive chairman of Sensus, D'Ambrosio was a senior advisor at Goldman Sachs. He later became a partner at the firm and leads its Value Accelerator.

== Other ==
In February 2010, D'Ambrosio was elected to the board of trustees of the Jackson Laboratory, a nonprofit biomedical research institution in Bar Harbor, Maine. D'Ambrosio presented at the World Economic Forum and served on panel discussions. D'Ambrosio was one of the executive producers of Mandy Gonzalez's debut album Fearless.

Business positions
Preceded by Don Peterson	President & CEO; Avaya; 2006–2008	Succeeded by Charles Giancarlo
