= Kevin J. Kennedy =

American business executive (born 1955)

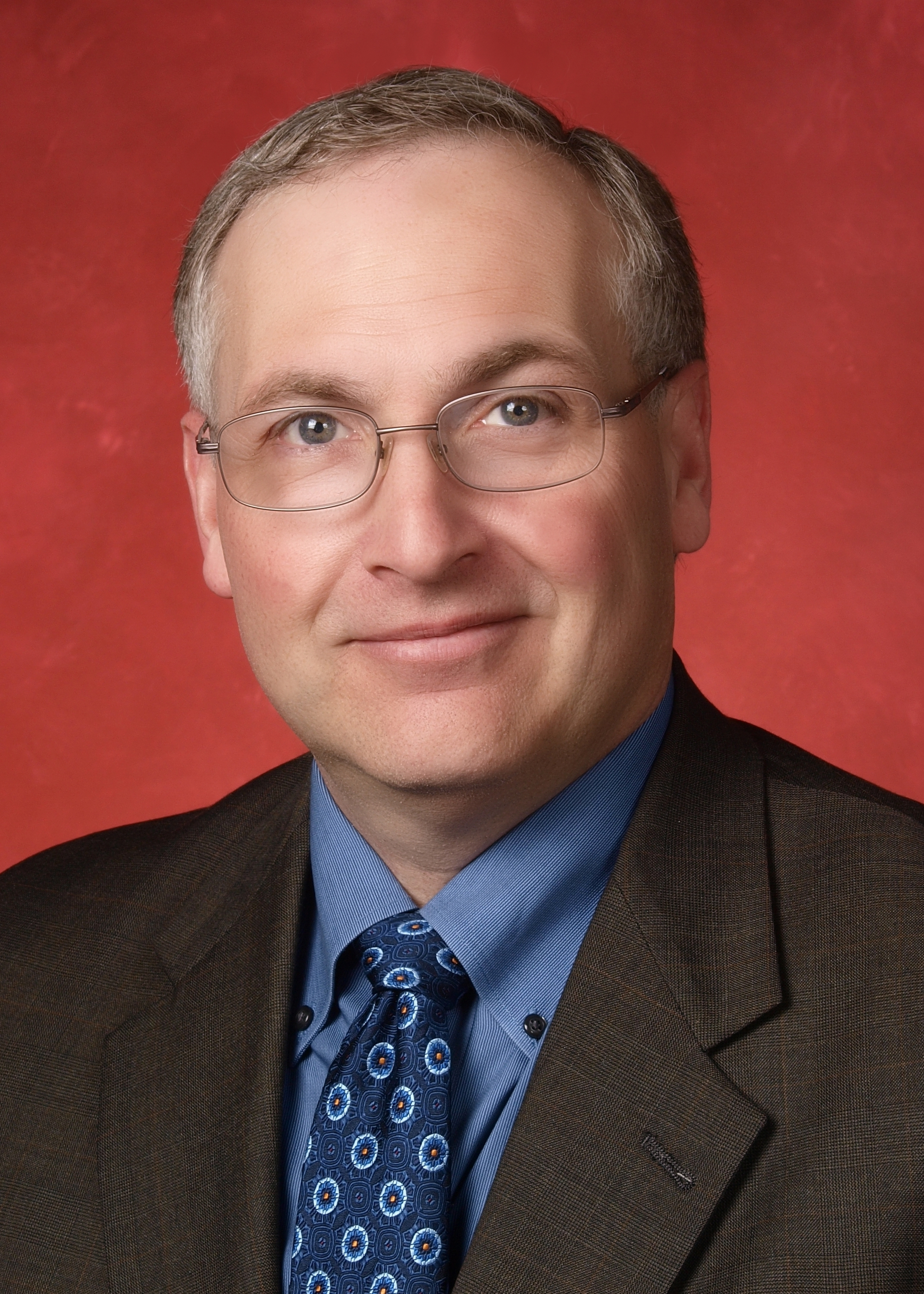
- Kevin J. Kennedy in 2009
- Born: 1955 (age 70–71)
- Occupation: Businessman
- Known for: Avaya Inc.

Kevin J. Kennedy (born 1955) is an American business executive. He is currently the CEO of Quanergy Systems (NYSE: QNGY and QNGY.WS), a growth company that develops software and sensor technology enabling 3D perception and autonomy, after joining the Board in 2019. Before Quanergy, Mr. Kennedy was the president and CEO of Avaya Inc. from January 2009 to October 2017

Kennedy holds a B.S. in mechanical engineering from Lehigh University and an MS and a PhD in engineering from Rutgers University and an EMBA from the University of Michigan. Before joining Avaya, he was CEO of JDS Uniphase Corporation, and prior to that he had worked at AT&T Bell Laboratories, Cisco Systems where he became a Senior Vice President, and then as Chief Operating Officer of Openwave Systems. During his career he has been elected to the board of directors of the following companies/organizations - UL Inc., Kla, Digital Realty, Solar Technologies and less recently Agility Communications, Canary Foundation, Freescale Semiconductor, JDS Uniphase, Openwave, Polycom, Quantum Corporation, Rambus

In 1987, he was a congressional fellow at United States House Committee on Science, Space and Technology, and in 2010 President Barack Obama appointed him to the President's National Security Telecommunications Advisory Committee, completing this service in 2019.

From 1982 to 1984, Kennedy was an adjunct professor at Rutgers where he published papers on computational methods, data networking, and issues of technology management.

Business positions
Preceded by Charles Giancarlo	President & CEO; Avaya; 2009–2017	Succeeded by Jim Chirico
