= Genesys (company) =

American technology company

Genesys Cloud Services, Inc.

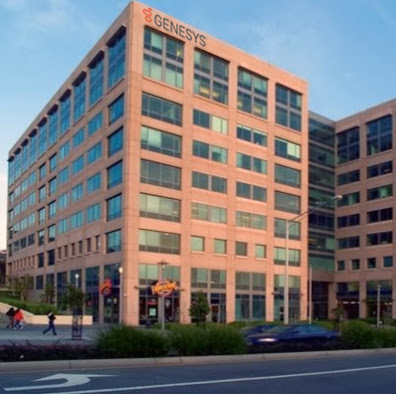
- Former headquarters in Daly City, California
- Formerly: Genesys Telecommunications Laboratories
- Type: Private
- Industry: Software
- Founded: 1990; 36 years ago
- Founders: Gregory Shenkman; Alec Miloslavsky
- Headquarters: Menlo Park, California, U.S.
- Area served: Worldwide
- Key people: Tony Bates (Chairman and (CEO); Brian Swartz (CFO); Eva Majercsik (Chief People Officer)
- Revenue: ▲$2.0 billion (2022)
- Owners: Hellman & Friedman; Permira; Technology Crossover Ventures
- Number of employees: 6000+ (2023)
- Website: genesys.com

Genesys Cloud Services, Inc. (Genesys), formerly Genesys Telecommunications Laboratories, Inc., is an American software company that sells customer experience (CX) and call center technology to mid-sized and large businesses. It sells both cloud-based and hybrid cloud software. The company was founded in 1990 and was acquired by investment firms Permira Funds and Technology Crossover Ventures (TCV) in February 2012.

== History ==
Genesys was founded by Gregory Shenkman and Alec Miloslavsky in October 1990. The company's original seed funding was $150,000 in loans from the founders' families. The company completed its initial public offering (IPO) in June 1997 and was listed on the NASDAQ stock exchange under the ticker symbol GCTI.

In late 1999, Alcatel-Lucent (then Alcatel) acquired Genesys for $1.5 billion.

In October 2007, Paul Segre succeeded Wes Hayden as Genesys's chief executive officer (CEO).

In February 2012, Permira and TCV acquired Genesys from Alcatel-Lucent for $1.5 billion.

In July 2016, private equity investor Hellman & Friedman purchased a $900 million stake in Genesys from majority owners Permira and Technology Crossover Ventures, valuing the company at $3.8 billion.

In May 2019, former Skype CEO Tony Bates joined Genesys as the new CEO, with former CEO Segre moving to the position of chairman.

=== Acquisitions ===
The company has grown over the years through a series of acquisitions.

In December 1997, Genesys acquired Forte Software, Inc. (later renamed Adante).

In December 1998, Genesys acquired Plato Software Corporation.

In June 1999, the company acquired Next Age Technologies, a workforce management software developer.

In May 2001, the company purchased IBM's CallPath computer telephony integration (CTI) business.

In 2002, Genesys parent Alcatel acquired Telera, a Campbell, California-based developer of voice portal and interactive voice response (IVR) systems, and merged the company into Genesys.

In April 2006, Genesys acquired VoiceGenie Technologies, a developer of voice self-service software based on VoiceXML.

In December 2007, Genesys announced it acquired Informiam, a developer of performance management software for customer service operations.

In January 2009, Genesys announced the acquisition of Conseros, a developer of high-volume work item management software and SDE Software Development Engineering, a creator of hosting management software for contact centers.

In May 2013, the company acquired Angel.com, a provider of cloud-based contact center solutions, from parent company MicroStrategy, for $110 million.

In March 2014, the company acquired Solariat, a developer of software to measure and manage social media engagements for customers.

In May 2014, the company acquired OVM Solutions, a developer of cloud-based customer communications software.

In 2016, the company acquired the Genesys division of EIT, its regional partner in Korea. In December, Genesys acquired Interactive Intelligence, a developer of customer experience software for the cloud, for $1.4B

In February 2017, Genesys acquired Silver Lining, an employee performance management company that developed applications to support and analyze employee performance and learning automation.

In February 2018, Genesys acquired AltoCloud, a customer journey analytics provider for an undisclosed amount.

In March 2020, the company acquired nGUVU, a partner purchased to add gamification to its workforce engagement management suite.

In March 2021, the company announced the acquisition the Bold360 suite of digital engagement software from LogMeIn.

In January 2024, Genesys acquired Radarr Technologies, an AI-powered data analytics company.

In June 2026, Genesys acquired PinkFish an agentic workflow and automation platform to accelerate the future of autonomous of experiences.

== Products ==
The company develops call center software for businesses. The software is available over the cloud, or as on-premises software. The company's products include the following:

- Genesys Multicloud CX, formerly Genesys Engage and PureEngage, Genesys' multicloud call center software available on all three major public cloud platforms – AWS, Azure and Google Cloud, deployed either in a public or private cloud setting.
- Genesys Cloud CX, formerly PureCloud, microservices-based software built on Amazon Web Services
- Genesys DX, predictive digital customer engagement software which combines customer experience software (CX) with artificial intelligence (AI)

Former Products:

- PureConnect, formerly Customer Interaction Center or CIC (developed by Interactive Intelligence), software for customer experience management at contact centers

== Operations ==
Genesys is headquartered in Menlo Park, California, and has offices in Canada, Latin America, Europe, the Middle East, Africa, Asia, and Australia.

== Sponsorships ==
Genesys is the primary sponsor of IndyCar Series driver James Hinchcliffe in the #29 Andretti Autosport Honda. The company also has sponsorships with the Texas Motor Speedway for the Genesys 300 and Genesys 600 races. In Ireland, the company is the principal partner for Connacht Rugby.

== See also ==
- List of speech recognition software
