= Don Peterson =

American executive

Donald K. Peterson is an American executive. Creator and former CEO of Avaya, he was formerly the CFO of Lucent.

== Early life and education ==
Peterson graduated from Worcester Polytechnic Institute in 1971 and Dartmouth College Tuck School of Business in 1973.

== Career ==
Peterson became CEO of the newly formed Avaya in 2000 and held that role until he stepped down in 2006.

== Personal life ==
Peterson and his wife, Maureen, through the Peterson Family Foundation, established the Peterson Family Professorship at the Center for Life Sciences and Bioengineering at Worcester Polytechnic Institute.

Business positions
Preceded by none	President & CEO; Avaya; Oct 2000–2006	Succeeded by Louis D'Ambrosio
