= Ticketek =

Australian event ticketing company

Ticketek Pty Ltd
- Type: Subsidiary
- Industry: Ticketing
- Founded: 1979; 47 years ago as Best Available Seating Service Pty Ltd. (Queensland)
- Headquarters: Sydney, New South Wales, Australia
- Area served: Australia/New Zealand
- Products: Sport and entertainment admission ticketing
- Owner: ecorp
- Parent: TEG Pty Ltd
- Subsidiaries: Softix, Eventopia
- Website: www.ticketek.com

Ticketek is an Australian event ticketing company. Founded in 1990, the company is owned by TEG Pty Ltd with its headquarters in Sydney. It operates ticketing operations for entertainment and sporting events in Australia and New Zealand.

Other companies use the name Ticketek in other countries. They are unrelated to Ticketek Australia/NZ operations but are a part of Ticketek Pty Ltd/Softix Pty Ltd.

Ticketek Pty Ltd sell the Softix premium ticketing software created by Softix Pty Ltd (a subsidiary of Ticketek) to other countries. Ticketek Pty Ltd also own the simplified ticket management company Eventopia.

== History ==
Ticketek was originally called Best Available Seating Service (Queensland) Pty Ltd (BASS). It was one of at least three Australian operations with similar names (all of which originated from the Bay Area Seating Service (BASS) of San Francisco, USA). The others were BASS (owned by the Adelaide Festival Centre Trust and still operating) and BASS Victoria owned by the Victorian Government under the auspices of the Victorian Arts Centre Trust until it was bought out by Ticketmaster.

Ticketek was owned by Publishing and Broadcasting Limited's Consolidated Press Holdings until it was sold to PBL's internet arm ecorp, in 1999, two years after introducing online ticketing in Australia. Ticketek was ecorp's major source of profit.

In November 2000, Ticketek formed a Hong Kong company called Ticketek Hong Kong in a joint venture with the Hong Kong Ticketing Alliance. In early 2003, ecorp sold its 50% stake in the Hong Kong operation to HKTA, with the venture being renamed Hong Kong Ticketing Limited.

In 2016, TEG acquired the concert promoter Dainty Group, expanding their business beyond ticket sales. Also in 2016, TEG acquired live experience company Lifelike Touring. In 2020, TEG acquired the Van Egmond Group, which later split off from the group in August 2026. In 2023, Ticketek acquired Left Field Live and Rugby Live to expand their TPG Sport division.

In 2019, TEG, owner of the Ticketek platform, was sold to American private equity firm Silver Lake from previous owners Affinity Equity Partners.

Ticketek sells around 18 million tickets to over 13,000 events annually. The company has ticketing contracts with certain venues such as the Melbourne Cricket Ground, the Sydney Cricket Ground, Sydney Super Dome and the Sydney Entertainment Centre. It was the provider of ticketing services for the 2000 Summer Olympics in Sydney.

== Tickets ==
=== Buying tickets ===
When an event goes on sale, tickets can be purchased online, by phone, through the app or in person. Ticketek operates "outlets" at major shopping centers, some news agencies, pharmacies and other locations. These agencies do not accept telephone bookings or enquiries which must be made online or by using the national charge by phone enquiry number, 13 28 49.

=== Ticketing options ===
Tickets can be printed at home (ezyticket), printed at a Ticketek outlet or sent through the mail. Some events allow patrons to enter and exit using digital tickets on smart phones through email, passbook/iPhone app or website/sms.

== Notable events and venues ==
Ticketek manage ticketing for

- Accor Stadium
- Sydney SuperDome
- Sydney Cricket Ground
- Allianz Stadium
- Melbourne Cricket Ground (MCG)
- Rod Laver Arena
- Melbourne Rectangular Stadium
- Her Majesty's Theatre
- Crown Entertainment Complex
- Lang Park
- Brisbane Entertainment Centre
- Newcastle Entertainment Centre
- Wollongong Entertainment Centre
- Canberra Stadium
- National Gallery of Australia
- Adelaide Entertainment Centre
- Adelaide Oval
- Crown Perth Entertainment Complex
- Regal Theatre
- Perth Arena

Ticketek also sells tickets to events including the Australian Open Tennis Tournament, Royal Melbourne Show, Royal Adelaide Show and Clipsal 500 Adelaide.

== Criticism ==
Ticketek has received severe criticism for excessive booking fees and delivery charges. A 2009 review of ticketing agencies by the Australian consumer magazine, Choice, criticised the ticketing industry for lack of competition, insufficiently transparent pricing, and for a lack of information on seat location before booking. While in 2012, Ticketek, in conjunction with Ticketmaster, received the annual Shonky Award from Choice for its excessive fees. The Federal Court in Sydney penalised Ticketek Pty Ltd $2.5 million for taking advantage of its market power following action by the Australian Competition and Consumer Commission.

Ticketek's system collapsed during the week 1 AFL finals on sale in 2018, angering thousands of fans. The AFL was forced to reschedule the sale for the following day.

In May 2024, it was revealed that a Ticketek data breach exposed the dates of birth, email addresses, genders, names, passwords and salutations of over 16 million past and current customers. The data was listed for sale on a popular hacking forum
