= Compuverde =

Information technology company

- Industry: Computer software
- Founded: 2008
- Founder: Stefan Bernbo, Christian Melander, Roger Persson
- Defunct: April 2019
- Fate: Acquired by Pure Storage
- Successor: Pure Storage
- Headquarters: Karlskrona, Blekinge, Sweden
- Website: www.compuverde.com

Compuverde AB (Compuverde) is an information technology company that specializes in computer data storage and cloud computing. It markets software-defined storage, converged storage, and unified storage platform, using computer clusters of standardized servers. It is headquartered in Karlskrona, Sweden.

The executive chairman of Compuverde is Mikael Blomqvist, also a board member of Blekinge Institute of Technology.

Compuverde is a member of the Storage Networking Industry Association trade group.

== History ==
Compuverde was founded in 2008 by Stefan Bernbo, Christian Melander, and Roger Persson.

In January 2012, Compuverde, Blekinge Institute of Technology and Ericsson received recognition from the Development of Knowledge and Competence (KK-stiftelsen) in Sweden for a joint venture project on big data storage and cloud computing.

In 2016 a product called Metro Cluster was announced for data centers.

In April 2019, Compuverde entered into a definitive agreement to be acquired by Pure Storage for an undisclosed amount of money.
