= Anjan Mukherjee =

American Businessman

- Education: Havard Business School (MBA)
- Occupation(s): Managing Partner, BayPine
- Known for: Counselor to the Secretary of the U.S. Treasury

Anjan Mukherjee is an American businessman and investor. He is the Managing Partner and founder of the investment firm BayPine. Previously, he was a senior executive at the Blackstone Group, and served as Counselor to the Secretary of the U.S. Treasury in the Obama administration.

== Early life and education ==
He attended Lexington High School. Mukherjee attended Harvard College, where he graduated magna cum laude as a Harry S. Truman Scholar, and received his MBA at Harvard Business School.

== Business career ==
Mukherjee joined the Blackstone Group in 2001 and was a Senior Managing Director in the private equity department and was a member of its Investment Committee. He led a number of the firm's most notable transactions including its investments in Change Healthcare, AVINTIV, Stiefel Laboratories and Celanese.

Mukherjee also worked at Thomas H. Lee Company and Morgan Stanley, in the mergers and acquisitions department. He joined the Board of Directors of TTEC Holdings in 2009.

In 2019, Mukherjee founded BayPine LP with David Roux. BayPine raised $3.0 billion for its inaugural fund.

== Public career ==
Mukherjee served as Counselor to the Secretary of the U.S. Treasury from 2015 to 2017 under President Obama. He also served as Deputy Assistant Secretary of Financial Institutions Policy during this time. He advised on a wide range of domestic and international issues related to financial markets and financial institutions policy. He worked to strengthen banking and derivatives regulation and was also involved with improving cyber-security for the financial sector.

Mukherjee took a leave of absence from Blackstone in 2008 to join the Presidential Transition Team of Barack Obama focusing on economic policy and international trade issues.
