= Interactive Intelligence =

Software company

Interactive Intelligence, Inc.

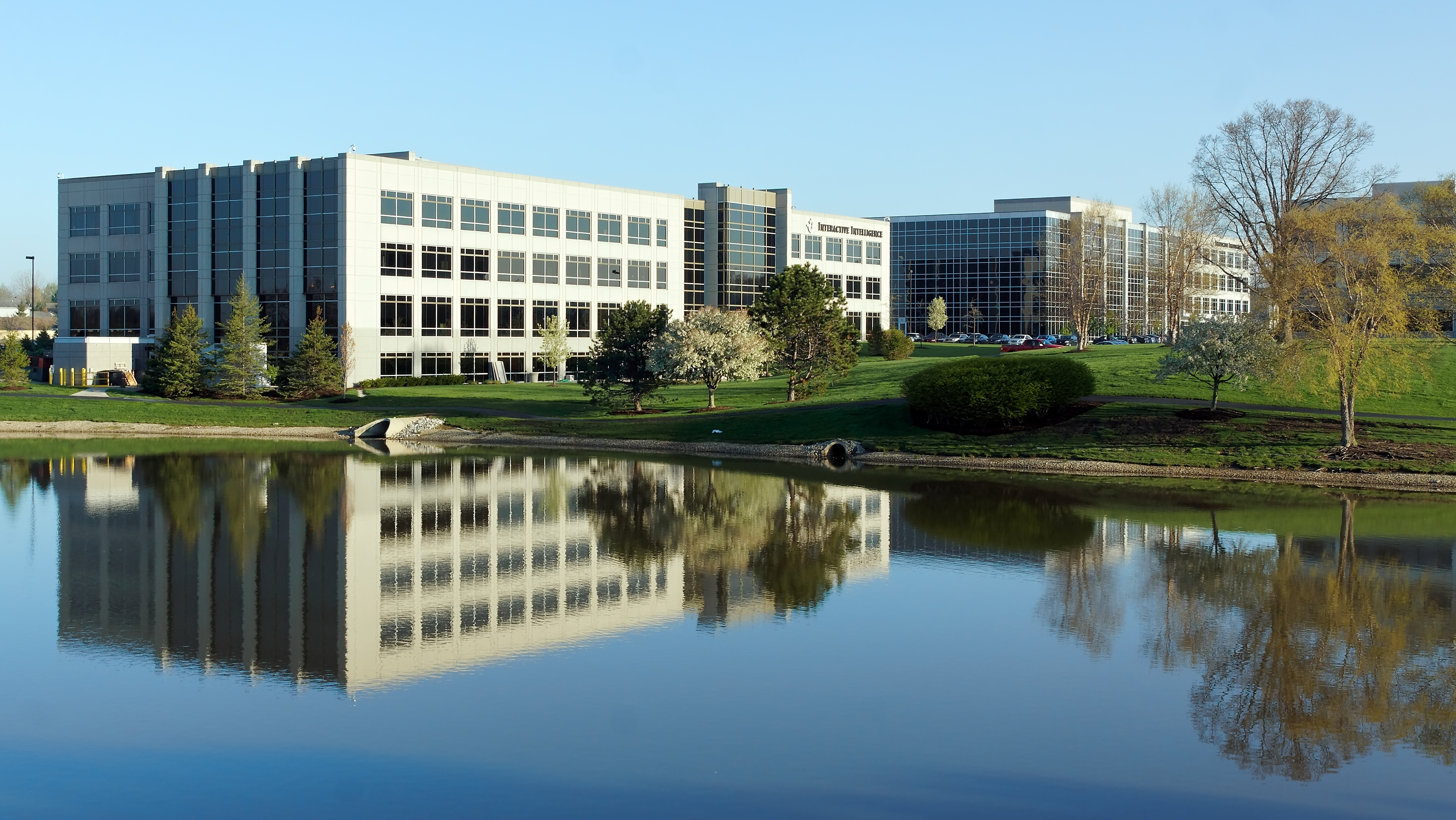
- Former headquarters in Indianapolis, Indiana
- Industry: Telecommunications software Cloud computing
- Founded: October 1994; 32 years ago
- Founder: Donald E. Brown
- Defunct: December 1, 2016; 9 years ago
- Fate: Acquired by Genesys
- Headquarters: Indianapolis, Indiana, United States
- Number of employees: 2,000 (2016)

Interactive Intelligence, Inc., was a telecommunications software and cloud computing development company that provided unified business communications solutions for call centers, Voice over IP companies, and business process automation.

In December 2016, the company was acquired by Genesys for $1.4 billion and its products were integrated into the PureCloud, PureConnect and PureEngage customer engagement platforms.

== Products ==
The company's core product offering was the Interaction Center Platform, which centralized multi-channel business interactions and business processes. This platform could be delivered as either a premises or hosted cloud computing offering. In addition to its software, the company provided add-on professional services, support, and education for its product line. The company had partnerships with Hewlett-Packard, IBM, Microsoft, Polycom, and Salesforce.com.

Genesys developed a customer experience platform portfolio from Interactive Intelligence technology. PureCloud is a contact center as a service (CCaaS) cloud platform that manages customer communication with comprehensive features. PureConnect, formerly called the Interaction Center Platform, integrates customer engagement functionality in one application suite. PureEngage is an omnichannel customer engagement for large organizations.

== History ==
In October 1994, Donald E Brown founded Interactive Intelligence in Indianapolis, Indiana.

In 1995, Brown became the president and chief executive officer of the company.

By 1997, the company was the first to market an all-in-one customer engagement software suite.

In September 1999, during the dot-com bubble, the company became a public company via an initial public offering that raised $29 million and its stock price rose 141% on its first day of trading.

In 2007, the company developed and cloud computing solutions for contact centers.

In May 2009, the company acquired AcroSoft, a provider of insurance content management solutions.

In October 2010, the company acquired Latitude Software, a debt collection software and services provider, for $14 million in cash.

In March 2011, the company acquired Agori Communications, a German-based reseller of its multichannel contact center solutions.

In July 2011, the company acquired CallTime, an Australian-based reseller.

In August 2012, the company acquired Bay Bridge Decision Technologies, a developer of capacity planning and strategic analysis technology.

In April 2014, the company acquired OrgSpan, a software development company focused on social and business communication.

In December 2015, the company acquired Customer 360, based in Mumbai, for around $10 million.

In May 2016, the company sold Acrosoft to Hyland Software.

In August 2016, after the company put itself up for sale, Genesys agreed to acquire the company for $1.4 billion. The acquisition was completed in December 2016 and all of the company's products and services were integrated with those of Genesys.

== Philanthropy ==
In 2010, the company formed Interactive Intelligence Foundation, a nonprofit organization focused on assisting at-risk students. The foundation raised funds to promote technology education for youth in Indiana and outside the United States. It hosted an annual gala and silent auction as part of its fundraising activities.

== Awards and recognition ==
The company was recognized as a "market leader" by industry analyst firms such as Datamonitor, Frost & Sullivan, and Gartner.

The company was recognized on Software Magazine's Top 500 Software and Services Companies" list for 12 consecutive years.

In 2011, the company was ranked 8th on Forbes list of America's 100 Best Small Companies.

The acquisition of the company by Genesys in 2016 was noted as the largest tech-company acquisition in Indiana since 2013.
