= ItsOn =

American software company

- Type: Private
- Industry: Software
- Founded: 2008
- Headquarters: Redwood City, California, United States
- Area served: Worldwide
- Key people: Greg Raleigh, Chairman and CEO. Thierry Chassaing, Senior VP of Product & Engineering Charles Giancarlo, Founder
- Website: www.itsoninc.com

ItsOn was an American software company based in Redwood City, California that developed cloud computing software for enhancing the performance of mobile networks. ItsOn's software platform gave mobile network operators the ability to offer granular and flexible, user-customizable services. Users could select and change mobile voice, text, and data services, as well as manage devices, plan sharing and permissions, directly from smart devices at any time.

ItsOn launched a mobile virtual network operator (MVNO) service, Zact Mobile, in 2013. Zact Mobile received the National Parenting Center's Seal of Approval for its family-oriented features and pricing. In January 2018, ItsOn filed for Chapter 11 bankruptcy protection and entered into liquidation.

== Technology platform ==
ItsOn was the first company to develop and commercialize a network function virtualization (NFV) platform that replaced the traditional hardware-based 3GPP policy control plane. ItsOn's cloud-based software enabled mobile operators to create and sell new services and provide users the ability to purchase mobile services in real-time directly from their smart devices.

The ItsOn technology platform overlaid existing infrastructure and extended service policy control to the edge of the network. The platform worked with existing billing systems and networks. The overlay consisted of a service controller, a service design center, and device clients.

== Services ==
ItsOn's services enabled mobile operators to respond to mobile users’ changing needs. Rather than choose from a limited selection of predefined plans, mobile users could purchase exact amounts of each type of service desired. Data could be purchased by quantity (for all uses) or for specific applications (such as Facebook). Service plans could be shared between devices and family members as determined by the account owner. Service plans could be changed as devices and user habits changed. Child curfews could be defined and applied to both mobile and Wi-Fi networks. Users were notified as they approached usage limits.

ItsOn's services allowed operators to introduce self-service capabilities that reduced the need for expensive and time-consuming telephone and in-store support. Users could add devices to their plans, monitor and purchase desired types and quantities of service, and control the use of specific applications via the ItsOn client application.

ItsOn's services enabled advertisers and businesses with rewards programs to provide sponsored services. Operators could offer “MVNO-in-a-box” solutions that allow value-added resellers to package devices with services. The ItsOn client application also served as a vehicle for upselling premium services such as international roaming.

The ItsOn platform could be employed by mobile device OEMs, device OS developers, and M2M developers (as well as mobile network operators and MVNOs) to create, test, and deliver new features and services. The platform could be used to conduct initial consumer research, test consumer value propositions, fine-tune user experiences, create new offers (via the ItsOn Service Design Center), develop customer care solutions, and provide detailed analytics.

== Company history ==
ItsOn was founded by Greg Raleigh and Charlie Giancarlo in 2008. ItsOn received just over $3 million in seed and venture round funding from 2009 to 2011, and $15.5 million in Series B funding (led by Andreessen Horowitz) in 2012.

ItsOn announced its Zact Mobile service in May 2013. The company announced an agreement with Best Buy Mobile in November 2013 to make Zact Mobile available in more than 400 stores throughout the United States.

On December 10, 2015, ItsOn announced its $12.5m raised in funding led by Delta Partners Group, with participation from several of existing investors, including Verizon Ventures, Andreessen Horowitz and Tenaya Capital.

In January 2018 Movistar Mexico announced that its service based on the ItsOn product was being discontinued due to the company liquidation.

== See also ==
- Network virtualization
- Cellular network
- Cloud computing
- Telecommunications billing
