= Skype Qik =

Video messaging service from Skype

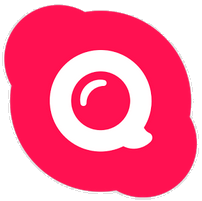

- Screenshot Skype Qik on Android
- Developer: Microsoft (as the Microsoft Skype division)
- Release: October 14, 2014; 12 years ago
- Final release: iOS: 1.9.1 (October 12, 2015; 11 years ago) [±]; Android: 1.9.0.6513-release (June 16, 2015; 11 years ago) [±]; Windows Phone: 1.2.1.158 (November 14, 2014; 11 years ago) [±]
- Operating system: iOS; Android; Windows Phone
- Type: Video messaging
- License: Proprietary
- Website: www.skype.com/en/qik

Qik, Inc.
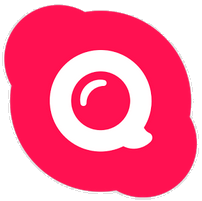
- Type: Private
- Founded: Redwood City, CA, USA (2007)
- Founder: Ramu Sunkara; Bhaskar Roy; Nikolay Abkairov
- Defunct: April 30, 2014
- Fate: Acquired by Skype Technologies

Skype Qik /kwɪk/ was a video messaging service by Skype. It was created by the company Skype Technologies, who acquired Qik. The service, offered for Android, iOS, and Windows Phone devices, allowed users to exchange video messages between individuals or within a group.

Previously, the Qik service offered a mobile-based live video-sharing website and two-way video conferencing application that allowed users to stream live video from their cell phones to the internet. Qik enabled users to record and upload video directly from supported cell phones. Qik, a Silicon Valley startup, launched its alpha version in December 2007 and went into public beta in July 2008.

Qik was compatible with approximately 140+ cell phones. Qik videos can be shared on numerous services including Ovi Share, Facebook via Facebook Connect, Twitter, Livestream, 12secondstv, YouTube, Blogger, Seesmic, Tumblr, WordPress, Digg, StumbleUpon, Del.icio.us, MySpace, and Technorati. The videos can also be shared directly on the Qik website or embedded on a webpage for live or pre-recorded videos.

The company's headquarters were located in Redwood City, California, with a satellite office that was located in Zelenograd, Moscow, Russia.

It was announced on January 6, 2011, at CES, that Skype had acquired Qik for a sum of $150 million.

On February 22, 2016, Microsoft announced their plans to retire the Skype Qik app on March 24, citing low usage. Many features from the app have been integrated into the Skype app.

== History ==
Qik was founded in a garage by Ramu Sunkara, Bhaskar Roy and Nikolay Abkairov in 2006.

In April 2008, Qik received $3 million (~$4.4 million in 2025) in Series B funding from Marc Benioff (Salesforce.com), Arjun Gupta (Telesoft Partners), and George Garrick (Jingle Networks). In September 2008, a month after its beta release, Qik received an undisclosed amount of investments from Netscape veterans Marc Andreessen and Ben Horowitz. Both agreed to serve as board advisers on Qik.

In mid-2009, Qik received another round of funding under $5.5 million (~$8.01 million in 2025) from Peter Loukianoff at Almaz Capital and Quest Venture Partners, and some private investors.

In January 2011, Skype acquired Qik for $150 million.

On March 19, 2014, Skype and Qik users received emails announcing the original Qik service was being retired. Notification of the impending shut-down was also posted on the company website. The Qik service was subsequently shut down on April 30, 2014.

The new Skype Qik service was launched on October 14, 2014.

After 9 years of service, on February 23, 2016, Microsoft decided to shut down Qik, therefore users will no longer be able to send or receive any messages via the video chat application. However, the company has also stated that many features of Qik are available via the Skype app.

== See also ==
- GroupMe
