= Tony Bates =

British business leader (born 1967)

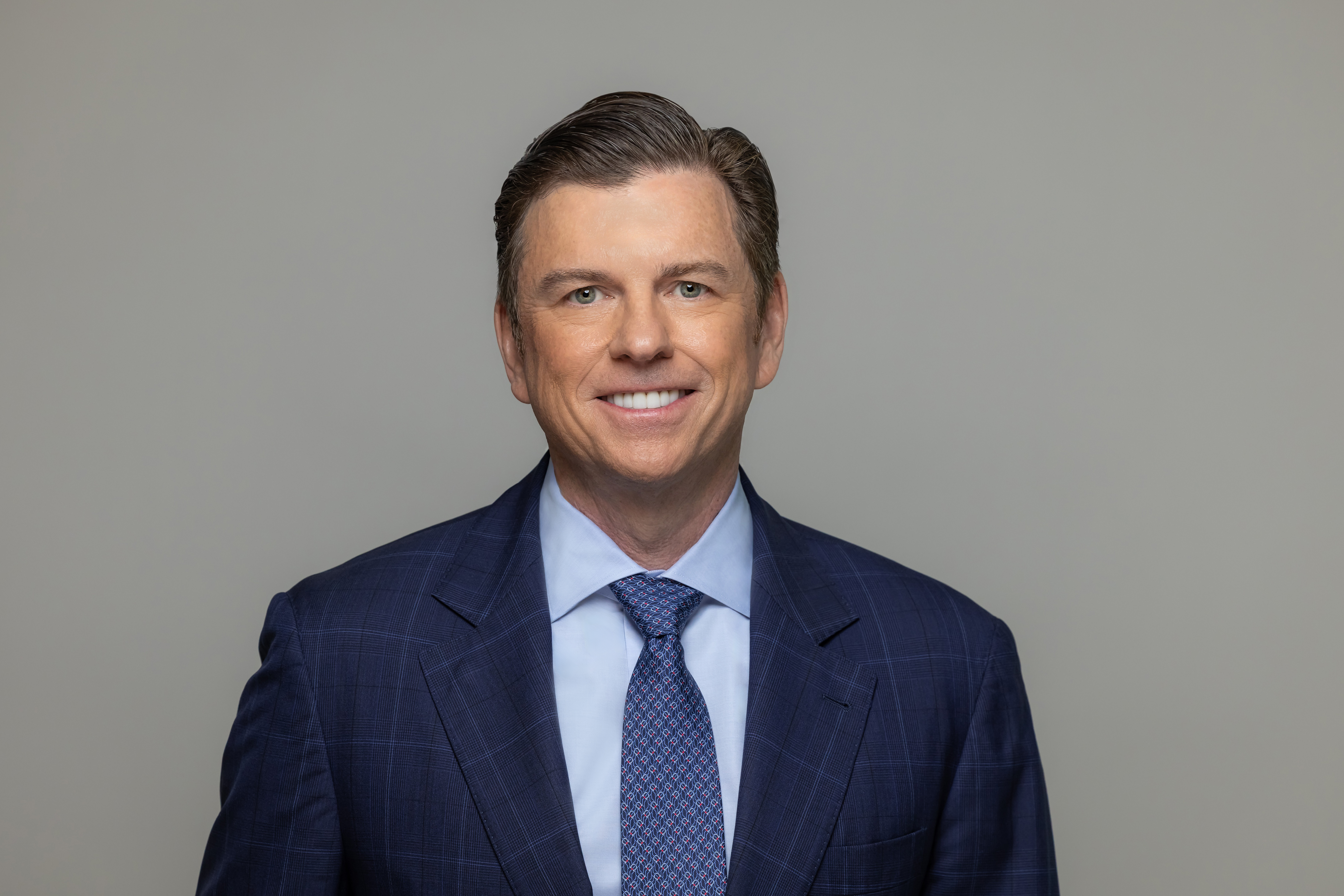
- Bates in 2025
- Born: Anthony J. Bates; 29 April 1967 (age 59); United Kingdom
- Occupations: Chairman and CEO of Genesys
- Spouse: Cori Bates
- Children: 4

Anthony J. Bates (born 29 April 1967) is a British born business leader and CEO of Genesys. He was also the former president of GoPro, former CEO of Growth at Social Capital, former executive vice president of Microsoft, and former CEO of Skype.

Bates, a university dropout, began his career in network operations and internet infrastructure. In the past, he has served on the boards of companies including YouTube, GoPro and eBay. He has also published a number of IETF RFCs and patents.

== Personal life ==
Bates was born in 1967 in West London. He was raised in Teddington by his hairdresser mother and stepfather who worked as a builder. He dropped out of his mechanical engineering program at South Bank Polytechnic.

== Career ==
=== 1986–1996: Early career ===
Bates’ first job was at the University of London as a network operator in the computer centre where he worked from 1986 to 1992. During his commute to university he taught himself the C programming language and by learnt UNIX through DEC manuals. Bates was fortunate to be involved in the early days of the Internet running the Arpanet gateways between the U.S. and the U.K. Bates helped transition the U.K. academic network JANET from the academic Coloured Book protocols to TCP/IP, helping to create the JANET IP Service (JIPS).

He left the University of London Computer Centre in 1992 to work in Amsterdam on a Réseaux Associés pour la Recherche Européenne (RARE)-funded project as part of the RIPE NCC, an organization responsible for establishing the Europe IP registry and a number of operational standards for European networking. In 1994, he moved to Virginia, which at the time was considered the nexus of the Internet.

=== 1996–2010: Cisco ===
Bates joined Cisco in 1996. He was employed at Cisco for over 14 years and became the senior vice president and general manager, heading up the enterprise, commercial and small business divisions. Whilst his main jobs related to infrastructure, he also worked on projects such as Cisco's integration with Scientific Atlanta gave him a glimpse of the user side of the Internet.

=== 2010–2011: Skype ===
In a 2011 interview with Voice on the Web, Bates admitted that one of his personal goals was to become the CEO of a company before age 45. According to the story, he wrote three names on a piece of paper and Skype was one of them. Bates said that once he joined as CEO, an engineer in Estonia asked him how long he had been using Skype. He said in 2004, and when they ran the details of his Skype ID to verify, the engineer admitted that Bates started using Skype before he had.

Bates was hired as CEO of Skype in October 2010. When Bates joined Skype, only 6.5 percent of its users paid to make calls from their computers to landline or mobile devices. He was looking for ways to monetize Skype and envisioned extending Skype beyond recreational and video calling. "The world previously looked very much like there was a business world and a consumer world," Bates said in 2010. "They’re blurring very quickly."

=== 2011–2014: Microsoft ===
By the time Microsoft bought Skype, the monthly user base had grown to 170 million connected users per month. When Skype was officially acquired by Microsoft for $8.5 billion (~$11.7 billion in 2024) in May 2011, Bates announced that he wanted to eventually reach 1 billion connected users on Skype.

As the president of the Skype Division, Bates focussed on extending Skype reach across Microsoft products like Internet Explorer, Windows 8,Outlook, and others. Microsoft also announced plans for video calling in Outlook.com and announced a preview version in April 2013. The service was later connected to Xbox, which Bates called a "gateway into the living room" in an interview with USA Today in 2012.

Rumors circulated that Bates was in the running to be the next CEO at Microsoft when Steve Ballmer announced his plans to the position in 2013. Bates was widely reported to be one of two internal candidates considered by the board for the role. In 2012, tech reporter Kara Swisher asked Bates directly if he would be the next CEO of Microsoft. He dodged the question. From July 2013 to March 2014, Bates was appointed EVP Business Development, Strategy and Evangelism, taking the only customer/partner and technology facing role which spans all of Microsoft's portfolio of products and businesses.

According to reports, he is rumoured to have left Microsoft following the decision by the company's Board to appoint Satya Nadella as successor to Steve Ballmer.

=== 2014–present ===
On 4 June 2014 GoPro announced the appointment of Tony Bates as President reporting directly to CEO Nick Woodman. In November 2016, GoPro announced that President Tony Bates would be stepping down at the end of 2016.

On 6 May 2019, Genesys announced the appointment of Tony Bates as CEO. In November 2023, Broadcom acquired VMware, dissolving the board and Bates' position at the company.

In 2024, Bates join the Board of Directors of Okta. In the same year, he received an Honorary Doctorate from London South Bank University.

== Empathy in Action ==
Bates published the book 'Empathy in Action: How to Deliver Great Customer Experiences at Scale' with his co-author Dr Natalie Petouhoff. Published by IdeaPress first as an eBook in December 2021, with the hardback edition published March 2022; this book examines how technology can become a force multiplier to deliver more empathy and integrate deeper, more personalized human connections into everyday business interactions at scale. The book was reviewed in Forbes by Adrian Swinscoe in the article 'How to Put Empathy into Action in Your Customer Experience'.

== Philanthropy ==
Bates served on the board on the Silicon Valley–based nonprofit Tipping Point Community from June 2012 to July 2020.

Business positions
Preceded by Paul Segre	CEO; Genesys; 2019-	Succeeded by None
Preceded by None	CEO, Growth; Social Capital; 2016-2018	Succeeded by None
Preceded by None	President; GoPro; 2014–2016	Succeeded by None
Preceded by None	Executive Vice President, Business Development; Microsoft; 2013–2014	Succeeded by Peggy Johnson
Preceded by None	President Skype Division; Microsoft; 2011-2013	Succeeded by None
Preceded by Joshua Silverman	Chief Executive Officer; Skype Technologies; 2010–2011	Succeeded by None
