= Everpure =

US data storage company

Everpure, Inc.
- Formerly: OS76, Inc. (2009–2010); Pure Storage, Inc. (2010–2026)
- Type: Public
- Traded as: NYSE: P (Class A); S&P 500 component
- Industry: Data storage
- Founded: 2009; 17 years ago
- Founders: John Colgrove; John Hayes
- Headquarters: Santa Clara, California, U.S.
- Key people: Charles Giancarlo (CEO)
- Products: Data Storage Hardware and Software
- Revenue: ▲US$3.663 billion (2026)
- Operating income: ▲US$114.816 million (2026)
- Net income: ▲US$188.181 million (2026)
- Total assets: ▲US$4.674 billion (2026)
- Total equity: ▲US$1.446 billion (2026)
- Number of employees: c. 6,400 (2026)
- Website: everpuredata.com
- Footnotes; Financials as of February 1, 2026

Everpure, Inc. (formerly known as Pure Storage) is an American publicly traded technology company headquartered in Santa Clara, California, United States. While the company originally focused on developing all-flash data storage hardware and software products, it has since expanded to provide a broader range of data management-related services. This evolution was formalized in February 2026, when the company rebranded as Everpure to reflect its shift toward integrated data management solutions.

== Corporate history ==
Pure Storage was founded in 2009 under the code name Os76 Inc. by John Colgrove and John Hayes. Initially, the company operated within the offices of Sutter Hill Ventures, a venture capital firm. Early development was supported by $5 million in early investments, followed by a $20 million Series B funding round.

During its stealth mode phase from 2009 to 2011, the company focused on developing software for storage controllers designed to run on generic flash storage hardware. The company emerged from stealth mode as Pure Storage in August 2011. Simultaneously, the company announced it had raised $30 million in a third round of venture capital funding. To expand into European markets, the company raised $40 million in August 2012. Following this, the company's growth increased by approximately 50% between 2012 and 2014.

Investment continued with an undisclosed amount from the venture capital arm of the American Central Intelligence Agency (CIA), In-Q-Tel, in May 2013, followed by a $150 million round in August. By this time, the company had raised a total of $245 million in venture capital investments. The following year, in 2014, Pure Storage raised $225 million in a series F funding round,valuing the company at $3 billion.

The company reported $6 million in revenues in fiscal 2013, $43 million in fiscal 2014, and $174 million in fiscal 2015. This growth continued as the company matured; by fiscal year 2018, it surpassed $1 billion in annual revenue. By fiscal year 2023, the company's subscription services annual recurring revenue (ARR) alone surpassed $1.1 billion. Everpure sold 100 devices in its first year of commercial production in 2012 and reached 1,000 devices by 2014. While the company had 750 employees in late 2014, it has since expanded to a global workforce of several thousand. In total, the company raised more than $470 million in venture capital before its initial public offering. By 2026, the company's hardware longevity was reflected in the fact that over 97% of all arrays ever sold remained in active use due to the Evergreen upgradeable architecture.

Between 2013 and 2016, the company was involved in a legal dispute with EMC regarding intellectual property and patent infringement. The litigation included allegations of trade secret theft involving former EMC employees and a countersuit alleging the illegal reverse engineering of an appliance. Following a series of court rulings and a reversed jury award, the two companies reached a definitive settlement in 2016 for $30 million, resolving all outstanding claims.

Everpure filed notification of its intent to go public with the Securities and Exchange Commission in August 2015. That October, 25 million shares were sold for a total of $425 million. The company hosted its first annual user conference in 2016. The following year, the board of directors appointed Charles Giancarlo as CEO, replacing Scott Dietzen. In 2017 (2018 fiscal year), Pure Storage was profitable for the first time and surpassed $1 billion in annual revenue.

Following its first year of profitability in 2017, the company began offering a subscription-led business model. This began with the 2018 launch of its Storage-as-a-Service offering, Evergreen//One. To bolster its cloud-native capabilities, the company acquired Portworx in 2020 for $370 million. By 2021, the company introduced Fusion to its Purity operating system to automate storage optimization across its platform. This period of expansion culminated in a significant financial shift; by fiscal year 2023, the company’s subscription services annual recurring revenue (ARR) surpassed $1.1 billion.

In November 2024, Everpure was one of the investors in the AI-oriented cloud provider CoreWeave's secondary share sale.

In February 2026, the company rebranded as Everpure to reflect its evolution from a data storage provider into a broader range of data management related services. Simultaneously, the company reported its first quarter with over a $1 billion in revenue for the fourth quarter of fiscal year 2026.

== Acquisitions ==
Everpure made its first acquisition in August 2018 with the $25 million purchase of StorReduce, a data deduplication software company. In April 2019, the company acquired Compuverde, a software-based file storage company, for an undisclosed amount.

This was followed by the $370 million acquisition of Portworx in September 2020, a provider of Kubernetes-based cloud-native storage and data management platforms. In February 2026, Everpure acquired 1Touch, an innovator in data intelligence and orchestration that provides a comprehensive, unified view of an enterprise's information.

== Solutions and Services ==
Everpure develops all-flash storage arrays as an alternative to traditional hard disk drives (HDD) and hybrid disk/flash systems. Its all flash-systems are designed for environmental efficiency, consuming 80% less power than HDDs. The company’s Purity platform serves as the unified operating environment for its various families, including FlashArray, which was released in 2011, and the FlashBlade family, which launched in 2016 and is optimized for AI and database workloads.

The company expanded its offering to include a service-led model with the 2015 launch of the Evergreen family of subscription services. These services, including Evergreen//One, are designed to reduce operational burdens and lower the total cost of ownership; notably, over 97% of arrays ever sold by the company remain in use due to this upgradeable architecture. In 2021, the operating system was expanded with Fusion, a set of features that optimizes storage automatically across storage arrays. In June 2025, the company introduced the Enterprise Data Cloud (EDC), an architecture designed to centrally manage virtualized data with unified control across on-premises, public, and hybrid cloud environments. This architecture enables autonomous data management and governance, supporting the company's 2026 rebranding and strategic focus on broader data management services.

The company's hardware and software products work with applications including those pertaining to artificial intelligence, cloud-native environments, and database management. Everpure has been positioned as a leader in the Gartner Magic Quadrant for 12 consecutive years.

In 2026, Everpure added a new capability, Everpure ActiveCluster for file, which provides companies with access to shared files online even if systems or sites go down.

== Data breach ==
In 2024, the company was impacted by a third-party data breach and extortion attempt involving the Snowflake data platform. While the breach involved the theft of certain customer and internal system information, an investigation confirmed that no customer Personally Identifiable Information (PII) was compromised.
