= Glenn Hutchins =

American businessman and investor (born 1955)

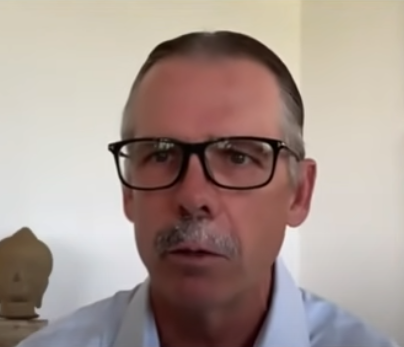
- Speaking at the 2021 World Economic Forum
- Born: 1955 (age 70–71)
- Education: Harvard University (BA, JD–MBA)
- Occupations: Chairman, North Island
- Known for: Co-founder of Silver Lake Partners

Glenn Hogan Hutchins (born 1955) is an American businessman and investor. He is a private equity investor focused on the technology sector, chairman and co-founder of North Island, and co-founder of Silver Lake Partners.

== Early life and education ==
Hutchins was born in Virginia in 1955.

After studying at The Lawrenceville School in New Jersey and graduating in 1973, Hutchins earned a BA from Harvard College in 1977. In 1983, he finished a joint JD/MBA program from Harvard Business School and Harvard Law School, which he completed simultaneously.

== Career ==
Hutchins began his career as a credit analyst at Chemical Bank after earning his BA from Harvard in 1977.

Following his graduation from Harvard Business School and Harvard Law School in 1983, he began his career in private equity at Thomas H. Lee Partners.

Hutchins left the firm in 1992 to join the Bill Clinton presidential transition team as a senior adviser focusing on economic policy. After serving as a special advisor on economic and healthcare policy in the Clinton Administration, Hutchins returned to private equity, this time joining The Blackstone Group in New York in 1994, where he was a senior managing director.

Hutchins co-founded Silver Lake Partners in 1999 alongside Roger McNamee and David Roux. He left the firm in 2012.

Hutchins was a director of the Federal Reserve Bank of New York, and chairman of its of Audit and Risk Committee, from 2011 through 2020.

Hutchins is chairman of North Island, an investment firm focused on private equity investments, which he co-founded in 2020 with James Hutchins and Travis Scher.

== Other affiliations ==
Hutchins is co-chairman of the board of trustees of the Brookings Institution. In 2013 he also created the Hutchins Center on Fiscal and Monetary Policy at Brookings Institution with a $10 million endowment grant.

He is a member of the Council on Foreign Relations.

Hutchins is on the boards of directors of AT&T and Banco Santander.

At GIC Private Limited, the sovereign wealth fund of Singapore, he is on the Investment Board and the International Advisory Board.

Hutchins is a former chairman of Instinet, a former chairnman of SunGard Data Systems, a former director of Nasdaq, and a former director of the Center for American Progress. He has also previously served on the boards of TD Ameritrade, Seagate Technology, MCI, Inc., Gartner, and Sabre Holdings.

The W. E. B. Du Bois Research Institute, established in 1975, was expanded and renamed the Hutchins Center for African and African American Research in 2013 after a $15 million gift from Hutchins via his Hutchins Family Foundation.

He is a partial owner of the Boston Celtics.
