= David Roux =

American businessman, technology investor and philanthropist

- Education: Harvard College; King's College, Cambridge; Havard Business School
- Occupations: Managing Partner, BayPine
- Known for: Co-founder, Silver Lake

David Roux is an American businessman, technology investor and philanthropist. He is the managing partner of the investment firm BayPine. Previously, he co-founded Silver Lake Partners with Jim Davidson, Glenn Hutchins and Roger McNamee.

== Early life and education ==
David Roux grew up in Lewiston, Maine, where he attended grade school and high school. He graduated from Harvard College, has an M.Phil from King's College, Cambridge, and an MBA from Harvard Business School.

== Career ==
After business school, Roux founded Datext and served as its CEO before it was acquired by Lotus Development. He served in leadership roles at Lotus and Oracle Corporation before becoming chairman and CEO of Oracle subsidiary Liberate Technologies. In 1999, he and his associates founded Silver Lake Partners.

In 2020, Roux founded BayPine LP with Anjan Mukherjee and serves as one of its managing partners.

== Affiliations ==
David has served in the boards of numerous private and public companies, including Boston Scientific, Symantec, Veritas Technologies, Seagate Technology, Business Objects, UGS Corp, Gartner Group, Intelsat, and Avaya, among others. He is currently chairman of The Jackson Laboratory. David previously served on the boards of Bowdoin College, National Audubon Society, the Environmental Defense Fund (EDF) and Center for Advanced Study in the Behavioral Sciences at Stanford University.

== Philanthropy ==
David is chairman of the Roux Family Foundation, through which he and his wife, Barbara, support a variety of education, conservation, biomedical research, global public health and veterans organizations. In 2013, he established the Roux Prize to honor individuals who have used health evidence in impactful ways. In 2014, David established The Roux Family Center for Genomics and Computational Biology at Jackson Laboratory. Most recently, he underwrote the construction of the Roux Center for the Environment which opened in 2018 at Bowdoin College.

Most recently, David and Barbara Roux have collaborated with Northeastern University to create The Roux Institute in Portland, Maine. This project was announced in January 2020 to promote regional economic development in Northern New England and will be supported by a $100 million grant from the Roux family. The project broke ground in September 2024 with a timeline for completion into 2027, and a total expected cost of $500 million.
