= Avi Networks =

Company

- Industry: Software
- Founded: 2012
- Founders: Murali Basavaiah; Ranga Rajagopalan; Umesh Mahajan; Guru Chahal
- Fate: Acquired by VMware (2019)
- Headquarters: Santa Clara, California, United States
- Key people: Amit Pandey (CEO)
- Products: Avi Vantage Platform
- Parent: VMware
- Website: avinetworks.com

Avi Networks is a company that provides software for the delivery of enterprise applications in data centers and clouds. Acquired by VMware in 2019, Avi Networks provides application services including local and global load balancing, application acceleration, security, application visibility, performance monitoring, service discovery, and container networking services. The company is headquartered in Santa Clara, California and has R&D, support, engineering, and sales offices in Europe and Asia.

== History ==
Avi Networks was founded in 2012 by Murali Basavaiah, Ranga Rajagopalan, Umesh Mahajan, and Guru Chahal and is headquartered in Santa Clara, California. Prior to Avi Networks, the founding team spent several years developing data center networking and storage solutions at Cisco Systems.

Avi Networks has raised $115 million in four rounds of venture funding. The initial round of $12.2 million was led by Greylock and Light Speed ventures, the second round of $20.8 million was led by Menlo ventures in addition to Greylock and LightSpeed and the third round added DAG ventures to the investment team. The most recent round of $60 million added Cisco Systems. The current CEO is Amit Pandey, who has experience as CEO with startups such as TerraCotta and Zenprise.

In December 2018, Avi Networks announced the appointment of Mark Anderson as executive chairman.

On June 13, 2019, VMware announced its intent to acquire Avi Networks, which finalized on July 11, 2019.

== Technology ==
Avi Networks introduced a software-only approach to application delivery and services with central management. The Avi Vantage Platform architecture separates the control or management plane from the data plane creating a distributed fabric of application service delivery points that are centrally managed. These service delivery points, called Avi Service Engines, deliver elastic load balancing, application acceleration, and security services on a per-application basis. The Avi Service Engines also send real-time application telemetry to the central Avi Controller which continuously analyzes the information to deliver application performance, security, and end-user insights.

Avi software runs on bare metal servers, virtual machines, and containers in data centers, private, and public clouds. The Avi Controller automates provisioning, configuration, and scaling of services through integration with VMware vCenter, OpenStack, SDN controllers, public clouds such as Amazon AWS and Google Cloud Platform, Red Hat OpenShift and Ansible, and container orchestration platforms such as Kubernetes, Docker, and Mesos.
