= Paul Segre =

American businessman

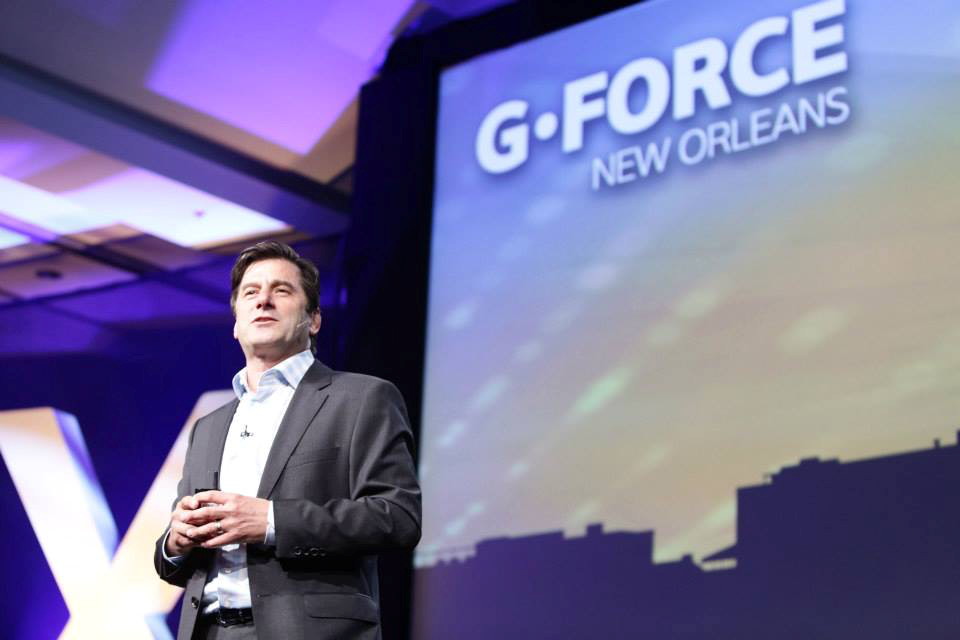
- Education: Bachelor's degree, mathematical sciences Master's degree, operations research
- Alma mater: Stanford University
- Occupation: CEO of Synamedia
- Known for: Former CEO of Genesys

Paul Segre is an American businessman who was named CEO of Synamedia on October 23, 2020. He was previously best known as the CEO of Genesys in Daly City, California. Segre received a bachelor's degree in the mathematical sciences and a master's degree in Operations Research from Stanford University in 1983.

In 2002, Segre was named chief technology officer of Genesys. He later became the company's chief operating officer. In October 2007, Segre replaced Wes Hayden as president and CEO of Genesys. From 2007 to 2012, Segre was the president of the Applications Group at Alcatel-Lucent. Before joining Genesys, Segre worked with DSC (Digital Switch Corporation), AT&T Network Systems and Bell Labs.

In 2014, Segre was recognized as a finalist for the Ernst & Young's Entrepreneur of the Year Award.

In 2018, Segre was named one of Glassdoor's Top 25 CEOs in Canada. He was ranked 14 with a 96% approval rating from employees. Since taking over at Synamedia, his Glassdoor approval rating has plummeted to 47%.
