= Mario Mazzola =

- Born: 1946 (age 79–80); Sicily, Italy
- Education: University of Bologna
- Occupations: Engineer, technology executive
- Years active: 1970s–present
- Employer(s): Cisco Systems (1993–2016), Pensando Systems (2017–present)
- Known for: Co-founding Crescendo Communications, Cisco Systems executive, networking technology development
- Spouse: Luciana Cavallet

Mario Mazzola is an Italian-American engineer and former technology executive who served as senior vice president and chief development officer at Cisco Systems, Inc. He began working for Cisco Systems in 1993. He is a graduate of the University of Bologna. In 2014 he was the recipient of Armenia's Global High-Tech Award.

== Early life ==
Mazzola was born and raised in Sicily, Italy. His first engineering position was with Olivetti in the 1970s. Olivetti's partnerships with Intel brought him to Silicon Valley.

== Career ==
=== Early career ===
In the 1980s, Mazzola co-founded David Systems, a company that attempted to integrate PBX technology with local area network technologies. At David Systems, he began working with Prem Jain and Luca Cafiero.

=== Crescendo Communications ===
Mazzola co-founded Crescendo Communications, which developed network switching hardware. In 1993, Cisco Systems acquired Crescendo Communications for $94.5 million, marking Cisco's first major acquisition.

During acquisition negotiations, Mazzola requested that Cisco retain all 62 Crescendo employees for at least two years. This led to the establishment of what became known internally as the "Mario Rule," requiring both CEOs to approve before terminating employees from newly acquired companies.

=== Cisco Systems ===
Mazzola joined Cisco in September 1993 as Vice President and General Manager. Crescendo's technology became the basis for Cisco's Catalyst 6000/6500 series switches.

In August 2001, Mazzola was appointed Senior Vice President and Chief Development Officer, a position created for him. In this role, he oversaw Cisco's research and development strategy and engineering organization.

==== Spin-in companies ====
Mazzola participated in Cisco's "spin-in" strategy, where the company funds startups as the sole investor before acquiring them. He was involved in several such ventures:

- Andiamo Systems - Focused on storage networking technology
- Nuova Systems - Developed unified computing systems
- Insieme Networks - Created data center networking solutions, acquired by Cisco for $863 million in 2013

According to Business Insider, Cisco invested $2.38 billion in spin-in companies involving Mazzola and his team over two decades.

=== Later career ===
In 2016, Mazzola left Cisco along with Jain and Cafiero.

In 2017, he co-founded Pensando Systems with his former colleagues. The company is based in Milpitas and develops distributed services platforms and raised $278 million in funding.

== Personal life ==
Mazzola is married to Luciana Cavallet. In 2015, they donated $1 million to establish a scholarship endowment at the American University of Armenia.
