= Airgo Networks =

- Type: Subsidiary
- Founded: May 2001; 25 years ago
- Headquarters: Palo Alto, California, U.S.
- Key people: Gregory Raleigh
- Products: WLAN
- Parent: Qualcomm
- Website: www.qca.qualcomm.com

Airgo Networks (formerly Woodside Networks), is a Palo Alto, California-based company specializing in the development of multiple-input multiple-output (MIMO) wireless technology. Airgo Networks was founded in 2001 by Gregory Raleigh, V.K. Jones, David Johnson, Geert Awater, Rolf de Vegt and Richard van Nee.

Airgo was a lead proponent of the 802.11n standard. The company began shipping the world’s first MIMO-OFDM chipsets in 2003.

In September 2005, Airgo Networks launched its third generation True MIMO chip set with support for data rates up to 240 Mbit/s.

On December 3, 2006, Qualcomm announced that it would acquire Airgo Networks for an undisclosed amount. Airgo is now owned by Qualcomm, although still located in Palo Alto, while Qualcomm's headquarters is in San Diego.
