= Silver Lake (investment firm) =

American private equity firm

Silver Lake Technology Management, L.L.C.
- Type: Private
- Industry: Private equity
- Founded: 1999; 27 years ago
- Founders: Jim Davidson; Glenn Hutchins; Roger McNamee; David Roux
- Headquarters: New York City; Menlo Park, California; United States
- Number of locations: Multiple offices in 4 countries
- Key people: Ken Hao (chairman); Mike Bingle (vice chairman); Egon Durban (co-CEO); Greg Mondre (co-CEO); Joe Osnoss (managing partner)
- AUM: US$110 billion (2025)
- Website: www.silverlake.com

Silver Lake Technology Management, L.L.C., is an American global private equity firm focused on technology and technology-enabled investments. Silver Lake is headquartered in New York City and Menlo Park, California.

In June 2024, Silver Lake was ranked 12th in Private Equity International's PEI 300 ranking of the largest private equity firms in the world.

== History ==
Silver Lake was founded in 1999, at the height of the late-1990s technology boom to make private equity investments in mature technology companies as opposed to the startups pursued by venture capitalists. Among the firm's founders were Jim Davidson, who had led the Technology Investment Banking business at Hambrecht & Quist; David Roux, who had an operational and entrepreneurial background, having been chairman and CEO of Liberate Technologies, executive vice president at Oracle Corporation, and senior vice president at Lotus Development; Roger McNamee, as the representative of Integral Capital Partners, a hybrid investment fund that made investments in publicly traded companies and venture capital investments in early-stage startups; and Glenn Hutchins, who came from Blackstone Group, had been a special advisor on economic and healthcare policy in the early Clinton administration, and had worked at Thomas H. Lee Partners.

The firm raised its first fund, Silver Lake Partners, with US$2.3 billion of investor commitments; it was among the best-performing funds of its vintage.

The firm's second fund, Silver Lake Partners II, was raised in 2004 with $3.6 billion of commitments.

The firm's third fund, Silver Lake Partners III, was raised in 2007 with $9.6 billion of commitments. Also in 2007, the firm launched a middle-market investment business, Silver Lake Sumeru, hiring Ajay Shah and the former investment team of Shah Capital Partners. Sumeru completed fundraising for its debut fund in 2008 with $1.1 billion of capital.

In 2011, Silver Lake Kraftwerk was launched to provide growth capital to later-stage companies in technology and tech-enabled businesses across the operations, energy, and resources industries.

After the sale of Skype to Microsoft in 2011, Silver Lake was accused of unfairly depriving Skype employees of an options windfall. At issue was a clause in the Skype employee stock option grant agreement. The repurchase right gave Skype the authority to buy back shares at the grant price, when an employee left the company, even when those shares were vested.

In 2013, the firm raised its fourth fund, Silver Lake Partners IV, which closed in 2013 with $10.3 billion in committed capital.

In 2017, the firm raised its fifth fund, Silver Lake Partners V, which closed at $15 billion of commitments. Jim Davidson retired from the managing partner committee.

In September 2020, it was announced that Silver Lake was negotiating to invest more than $1 billion in Reliance Retail, an Indian retail company.

In January 2021, the firm raised $20 billion for its sixth fund, Silver Lake Partners VI. In December, Silver Lake purchased a 33.3% stake in the Australian Professional Leagues (APL). The group organizes Australia's national association football leagues (the A-League Men, A-League Women and A-League Youth). Silver Lake also had a stake in City Football Group, which owns A-League club Melbourne City FC. Silver Lake has estimated the value of the APL and its affiliate holdings at over US$300 million.

In May 2024, the firm raised $20.5 billion for its seventh fund, Silver Lake Partners VII.

In August 2025, Silverlake invested $400 million in a joint venture with Commonwealth Asset Management's Adam Fisher and Peter Rumbold to secure powered land for resale to data-center developers.

In September 2026, Silver Lake filed a lawsuit against Carl Icahn and several hedge funds in the Delaware Court of Chancery, seeking to block appraisal claims related to its acquisition of Endeavor Group Holdings.

== Key personnel ==
In December 2019, Silver Lake appointed Egon Durban, a founding principal of Silver Lake, and Greg Mondre as co-CEOs; it also promoted Joe Osnoss to managing partner. Silver Lake announced Ken Hao as chairman and Mike Bingle vice chairman and managing partner emeritus, with the launch of Silver Lake Partners VI. In December 2023, Silver Lake promoted Christian Lucas to managing partner.

== Investments ==
Since 1999, Silver Lake made investments through leveraged buyout transactions, minority growth investments and private investment in public equity (PIPE) investments. Some of its private equity investments include:

Investment	Year	Sector	Company description	Ref.
TikTok USDS	2026	Social media	TikTok announced on January 22, 2026, that ByteDance and the company have come to a deal to launch an American version of TikTok. 15% percent of TikTok USDS was purchased by a group led by Oracle, MGX Fund Management Limited, and Silver Lake, with the remaining five percent coming from other investors.	
Electronic Arts	2025	Video games and entertainment	In September 2025, Silver Lake announced the acquisition of video game company Electronic Arts (EA). The company, which develops game series such as Madden NFL and The Sims, was acquired for a historic $52.5 billion.	
Altera	2025	Integrated circuits	Silver Lake acquired 51% stake in Altera.	
Diamond Baseball Holdings	2022	Sports	Silver Lake acquired direct ownership from subsidiary Endeavor in late 2022. Diamond Baseball Holdings owns and operates over 40 Minor League Baseball teams.	
Software AG	2022	Integration software	In February 2022, Silver Lake Invested €344 million. In April 2023, it offered to buy out the firm for €2.2 billion	
Integrity	2021	Insurtech	In December 2021, Silver Lake Invested $1.2 billion	
Australian Professional Leagues	2021	Sports	In December 2021, Silver Lake acquired a 33.3% shareholding	
Group 42	2021	Information technology	In April 2021, Silver Lake announced an investment of around $800 million to Group 42, a major part of the Emirates' COVID-19 response and vaccination programme.	
Klarna	2020	Financial	In September 2020, Silver Lake made investments in Klarna Bank totaling a reported $500 million, for a less than 5 percent stake.	
Jio	2020	E-commerce	In May 2020, Silver Lake invested a reported $753 million in Reliance Retail's digital unit, Jio. In June 2020, Silver Lake invested another reported $602 million in the company.	
Expedia Group	2020	E-commerce	On April 23, 2020, Silver Lake and Apollo Global Management, Inc. anchored Expedia Group's $3.2 billion new capital raising.	
Airbnb	2020	E-commerce	On April 6, 2020, Silver Lake and Sixth Street Partners invested $1 billion.	
Twitter	2020	Social media	On March 9, 2020, Silver Lake made a $1 billion investment.	
Waymo	2020	Autonomous driving	On March 2, 2020, Silver Lake led Waymo's first external investment round.	
TEG Pty Ltd	2019	Ticketing company		
First Advantage	2019	Worker analysis	On November 27, 2019, Silver Lake agreed to acquire First Advantage from Symphony Technology Group (STG) for $1.25 billion.	
City Football Group	2019	Sports	On November 27, 2019, Silver Lake announced a definitive agreement to make a $500 million equity investment in City Football Group.	
Verily	2019	Biotechnology	On January 3, 2019, Silver Lake led a $1 billion investment round in Alphabet's subsidiary.	
ServiceMax	2018	Information technology	On December 13, 2018, GE Digital announced its intention to sell the majority of ServiceMax to Silver Lake Partners, while retaining a minority stake of 10% in the future of the company.	
AMC	2018	Entertainment	On September 14, 2018, Silver Lake Alpine invested $600 million.	
GoodRx	2018	Telemedicine	In 2018, Silver Lake bought a reported 35.3% of equity in GoodRx, valuing the company at a reported $2.8 billion. In 2020, Silver Lake invested another $100 million into GoodRx through a private placement set to the price of GoodRx's IPO.	
Ant Group	2018	Financial	In 2018, Silver Lake made investments in Ant Group totaling a reported $500 million. In 2020, as Ant Group approached its IPO, the company was reportedly worth $210 billion in comparison to its 2018 reported worth of $150 billion. This increase would create a 40% return for these funds if they were to sell in the IPO at that valuation.	
Credit Karma	2018	Financial	On March 28, Silver Lake made a $500 million secondary investment.	
Blackhawk Network	2018	E-commerce	On January 16, 2018, Silver Lake and P2 Capital Partners purchased Blackhawk Network, a company offering prepaid gift, reward and incentive technologies and solutions.	
WP Engine	2018	Information technology	On January 4, 2018, Silver Lake invested $250 million in WP Engine, a WordPress digital experience platform.	
Cornerstone OnDemand	2017	Worker management	On November 8, 2017, Silver Lake Alpine led a $300 million investment in Cornerstone OnDemand, a cloud-based learning and human capital management software company.	
Unity Technologies	2017	Game engine	On May 24, 2017, Silver Lake announced an investment in Unity	
SoFi	2017	Financial	On February 24, 2017, Silver Lake led a $500 million Series F financing round.	
Ancestry	2016	Genealogy	On April 1, 2016, Silver Lake and GIC made an investment in Ancestry, the online family history data and personal DNA testing company.	
Symantec	2016	Cybersecurity	On February 4, 2016, Silver Lake made a strategic investment of $500 million in Symantec. On June 13, 2016, it was announced that Symantec would acquire Blue Coat, and Silver Lake invested another $500 million in conjunction with the transaction.	
SolarWinds	2015	Information technology	On October 21, 2015, Silver Lake purchased SolarWinds for $60.10 per share, giving the company a total equity value of $4.5 billion. In October 2018, SolarWinds went public through an IPO.	
EMC	2015	Information technology	On October 12, 2015, EMC announced that they had agreed on a buy-out by Michael Dell and Silver Lake for $33.15 per share in a complicated cash transaction which included tracking stock in VMware, which remained a publicly traded company. The November 2023 sale of VMware to Broadcom yielded the largest-ever gain in the private equity industry for Silver Lake and Dell, a combined total of $70 billion in cash and stock.	
Motorola Solutions	2015	Information technology	On August 5, 2015, Silver Lake invested $1 billion in Motorola Solutions in convertible senior notes with a 5-year term at $68.50 per share to help the company make new partnerships, investments, and acquisitions for its public safety solutions and services businesses. The company was then valued at $12.6 billion. Motorola Solutions also used a portion of the investment to fund a share buyback.	
Dell	2013	Information technology	On February 5, 2013, Dell announced that it had agreed on a buy-out by Michael Dell and Silver Lake for $13.65 per share in cash. The shares of founder and CEO Michael Dell and some of its key management were not included in this purchase. Microsoft additionally provided $2 billion in the form of a loan to assist with the buy-out. Upon completion of the deal Dell de-listed from NASDAQ and the Hong Kong Stock Exchange and became fully privately owned company as it was before its first initial public offering. According to Michael Dell, this move made it easier to work on a long-term growth strategy as the company could make choices that would payout on the longer term, without the need the address to demands of (short term) individual share-holders. The deal was completed on October 30, 2013, and at $24.4 billion was then the largest technology buyout ever, surpassing the 2006 buyout of Freescale Semiconductor for $17.5 billion. Other smaller investors were MSD Capital, an investment firm established to manage the wealth of Michael Dell, and Microsoft with its $2 billion loan, and there were several debt-facilities from banks like Barclays, Credit Suisse, Bank of America and Royal Bank of Canada. In December 2018, Dell shareholders agreed to a proposal by Dell to engage in a reverse merger with the tracking stock tied to its interest in software provider VMware in which existing holders were invited to cash out some or all of their interest. Dell Technologies is now a public company again.	
Global Blue	2012	Financial	On May 24, 2012, Silver Lake acquired Global Blue, a leading VAT services provider in Europe, for around €1 billion.	
Endeavor	2012	Sports and entertainment	On May 2, 2012, Silver Lake acquired a minority stake in William Morris Endeavor (WME). In December 2013, WME and Silver Lake announced they would acquire IMG. In July 2016, Silver Lake helped back WME-IMG's acquisition of UFC. In October 2017, WME-IMG announced the formation of a new holding company, Endeavor, which took on the full portfolio of owned and operated brands formerly under the WME-IMG banner. Endeavor went public in 2021, trading under ticker symbol "EDR" on the NYSE. In April 2024, Silver Lake acquired the remaining shares of the company to take it private in a deal that valued Endeavor at $13 billion. The take-private transaction was completed on March 24, 2025.	
Alibaba	2011	E-commerce	In 2011 and 2012, Silver Lake made investments in Alibaba totaling a reported $500 million. In September 2014, Alibaba listed on the NYSE in the largest ever US-listed IPO, with Silver Lake maintaining a stake worth more than $5.1 billion at the time.	
GoDaddy	2011	Web hosting	On July 1, 2011, Silver Lake and others joined with Bob Parsons to take GoDaddy private. In 2015, GoDaddy re-entered the public market.	
Skype	2009	Communication software	Silver Lake, Andreessen Horowitz and the Canada Pension Plan Investment Board announced the acquisition of 65% of Skype for $1.9 billion from eBay, valuing the business at $2.75 billion. In May 2011, Microsoft agreed to acquire Skype for $8.5 billion in cash.	
Avaya	2007	Communication software	Silver Lake and TPG Capital completed an $8.2 billion leveraged buyout of the enterprise telephony and call center technology company that was formerly a unit of Lucent.	
Sabre	2006	E-commerce	Silver Lake and TPG Capital announced a deal to buy Sabre, which operates Sabre Travel Network and Sabre Airline Solutions, for approximately $4.3 billion in cash, plus the assumption of $550 million in debt. Earlier in 2006, Blackstone acquired Sabre's chief competitor Travelport.	
NXP Semiconductors	2006	Electronics	In August 2006, a consortium of Silver Lake, KKR and AlpInvest Partners acquired a controlling 80.1% share of the semiconductors unit of Philips for €6.4 billion. The new company, based in the Netherlands, was renamed NXP Semiconductors.	
SunGard	2006	Information technology	SunGard was acquired by a consortium of seven private equity investment firms in a transaction valued at $11.3 billion. The partners in the acquisition were Silver Lake, which led the deal as well as Bain Capital, Blackstone, Goldman Sachs Alternatives, KKR, Providence Equity Partners, and TPG Capital. This represented the largest leveraged buyout completed since the takeover of RJR Nabisco at the end of the 1980s leveraged buyout boom. Also, at the time of its announcement, SunGard would be the largest buyout of a technology company in history, a distinction it would cede to the buyout of Freescale Semiconductor. The SunGard transaction is also notable in the number of firms involved in the transaction. The involvement of seven firms in the consortium was criticized by investors in private equity who considered cross-holdings among firms to be generally unattractive. In 2015 the consortium sold the bulk of the Sungard business to FIS.	
Broadcom	2005	Electronics	In 2005, the semiconductor division of Agilent was acquired by Silver Lake and KKR, to form Avago Technologies, one of the largest privately held semiconductor companies in the world. In 2009, Avago completed a $650 million initial public offering. In 2013, Silver Lake reinvested $1 billion in Avago to help finance its acquisition of LSI. In 2015, Silver Lake supported Avago's $37 billion acquisition of Broadcom, the biggest tech deal on record at the time.	

== Investment strategies ==
Silver Lake operates through four primary strategies, all focused on technology investments:

- Silver Lake Partners makes private equity investments in large-cap technology and tech-enabled companies. Silver Lake Partners comprises the bulk of the firm's assets under management.
- Silver Lake Alpine provides structured equity and debt investments in technology and technology-enabled companies.
- Silver Lake Waterman provides growth capital, via a proprietary growth debt product, to later-stage growth companies in technology and technology-enabled industries.
- Silver Lake Long Term capital is a long-term strategy that allows a broad mandate to invest in debt and equity across geographies and industries.
