= Alexander Asseily =

British-Lebanese investor and entrepreneur

- Born: London, England
- Education: BSc Product Design, 1997, MSc Mechanical Engineering, Stanford University, 1998
- Occupations: Entrepreneur, Investor

Alexander Asseily is a British/Lebanese technology entrepreneur and investor. He has been a founder of various companies including consumer electronics company Jawbone, women's health company, Elvie, and Zulu Group. His business interests in the field are extensive, and he has held executive roles with companies such as Lilium, Atomico Ventures and Azimo.

== Education and early career ==
Raised in Beirut, Lebanon and London, UK, Asseily was educated in England before moving to California to obtain a Bachelor of Science in product design in 1997 and a master's in mechanical engineering in 1998 from Stanford University.

In 1999, Asseily founded Aliph (AliphCom) with Hosain Rahman to develop voice communications technologies that were based on ideas originating from his Stanford senior thesis, starting with noise suppression products. In 2002, the company won a contract with DARPA, the Pentagon's research body, to look into ways for soldiers to communicate in adverse noise conditions. The product was initially trademarked Noise-Assassin.

== Notable entrepreneurial work ==
In September 2004, Aliph company released its first consumer headset product under the Jawbone brand, followed by the Jawbone Bluetooth headset in 2006. In 2010, Aliph launched the Jambox wireless speakers on the back of its success in Bluetooth headsets. It was one of the first Bluetooth speakers that was considered to be truly portable with a sleek design and high sound quality.

In 2011, Aliph started operating as Jawbone, a company that had at the time secured more than $100 million in growth funding from the Mayfield Fund, Khosla Ventures, Sequoia Capital, Andreessen Horowitz, Yuri Milner and J.P. Morgan, among others. Jawbone subsequently released the Mini Jambox and Big Jambox, with differing options in size, portability and sound output. Asseily was CEO of Jawbone until 2007, executive chairman until 2011 and non-executive chairman until his departure in January 2015.

In 2011-2012, Asseily raised $14 million in seed financing to develop State, a social network to connect people through their opinions, which he co-founded with his brother Mark Asseily that launched at TechCrunch Disrupt in September 2013.

He founded Zulu Group in 2013 to invest in high-impact ideas. That same year, Asseily co-founded Chiaro Technology with Tania Boler in 2013. The women's health startup is best known for developing the wearable breast pump, the Elvie Pump, and its pelvic floor exerciser, the Elvie Trainer, which were accompanied by an app to track progress. The trainer product won the Best R&D Award at the AXA PPP Health Tech and You awards 2015 and was also the winner of the Red Dot Product Design Award in 2016.

In 2016, Asseily invested in Lilium, an electric vertical-takeoff-and-landing (eVTOL) jet aircraft startup, where he was executive vice chairman. The company went public on the NASDAQ in 2021.

== Other investments ==
Asseily was an entrepreneur partner at Atomico, which invests in technology companies and founded in 2006 by Skype co-founder, Niklas Zennström.

He was also non-executive chairman at Azimo, a money transfer business based in London. Azimo was acquired by Papaya Global in 2022.

In 2011, Asseily also invested in Lulu, a dating intelligence app marketed at college-age women.

Asseily acted as an advisor to Osper, a company that provides pre-paid debit cards for children, after investing in the company in 2013. Alongside other tech investors, Asseily backed SmartUp, an app designed to aid start-ups. He is also an investor in the club and work space Second Home.

== Personal life and recognition ==
He has produced two documentaries pertaining to conflict in the Middle East and acted as executive producer for feature-length documentary Aluna. The film centers around the ancient Kogi tribe of Colombia, who emerge from their native land to warn the rest of the world about environmental dangers and how to address them. The film was released in June 2012. He also produced the short film Two Men, One War, 33 Years On, which was broadcast on CNN, about two Lebanese civil war fighters reconciling with their past.

In 2015, he partnered with a design studio to reimagine the disco ball as a programmable modular lighting sculpture known as "Disco Disco". The project was showcased at exhibitions in London and Paris. Asseily was recognized as one of Europe's top technology entrepreneurs in the Financial Times Eurotech 50 list that same year. Business Insider named Asseily the 33rd most influential person in Silicon Valley in 2013.
