= The Venice Project (disambiguation) =

The Venice project can refer to:

- The Venice Project - drama film directed by Robert Dornhelm
- Joost formerly code-named The Venice Project - peer-to-peer video distribution service (the new venture of Niklas Zennström and Janus Friis, founders of Skype)
