= Wire Swiss =

Software company headquartered in Switzerland

Wire Swiss GmbH
- Formerly: Zeta Project Swiss GmbH
- Company type: Private
- Industry: Communication software
- Founded: 2012
- Founders: Jonathan Christensen, Priidu Zilmer, Alan Duric
- Headquarters: Zug, Switzerland
- Key people: Benjamin Schilz, CEO; Adam Low, CPTO; Oliver Brown, CCO
- Products: Wire
- Number of employees: 50
- Website: wire.com

Wire Swiss GmbH is a software company with headquarters in Zug, Switzerland. Its development center is in Berlin, Germany. The company is best known for its messaging application called Wire.

The Wire app allows users to exchange end-to-end encrypted instant messages, as well as make voice and video calls. The software is available for the iOS, Android, macOS, Linux and Windows operating systems and WebRTC-compatible web browsers. It uses the Internet to make voice and video calls; send text messages, files, images, videos, audio files and user drawings depending on the clients used. It can be used on any of the available clients, requiring a phone number or email for registration. It is hosted inside the European Union and protected by European Union laws.

Many employees working on Wire have previously worked with Skype, and Skype's co-founder Janus Friis is backing the project. Audio quality is one of Wire's key selling points.

Since January 2024 the company is headed by Benjamin Schilz as CEO. Before joining Wire, Schilz founded Acorus Networks and later worked for the security company F5. In April 2024, the company announced a strategic partnership with the Schwarz Group, where the companies of the Schwarz Group would invest in Wire.

== History ==
Wire Swiss GmbH was founded in Fall 2012 by Jonathan Christensen, Alan Duric and Priidu Zilmer, who previously worked at Skype and Microsoft. Jonathan Christensen previously co-founded Camino Networks in 2005 with Alan Duric, who also co-founded Telio. Camino networks was later acquired by Skype, a division of Microsoft Corporation. At Skype, Jonathan was responsible for getting Skype into new platforms such as Internet televisions and set-top boxes, while Priidu Zilmer, former head of design at Vdio, lead the Skype design team. On December 7, 2017, the company announced that former Huddle CEO Morten Brøgger had replaced Alan Duric as the company's CEO, and that Duric would join Wire’s Board of Directors and resume his role as CTO/COO.

The company launched the Wire app on December 3, 2014. Shortly after its launch, the company retracted a claim from their website that the app's messages and conversation history could only be read by the conversation participants. In August 2015, the company added group calling to their app. From its launch until March 2016, Wire's messages were only encrypted between the client and the company's server. In March 2016, the company added end-to-end encryption for its messaging traffic, as well as a video calling feature. Wire Swiss GmbH released the source code of the wire client applications under the GPLv3 license in July 2016. The company also published a number of restrictions that apply to users who have compiled their own applications. Among other things, they may not change the way the applications connect and interact with the company's centralized servers. Wire Swiss started open sourcing Wire's server code in April 2017. On September 19, 2017, the company announced that they had finished open sourcing the server code, licensed under the AGPL. In July 2019 Wire raised $8.2m investment from Morpheus Ventures and others. On July 18 of the same month, 100% of the company's shares have been taken over by Wire Holdings Inc., Delaware, USA. As of August 13, 2020 the Wire Group Holding GmbH from Germany is the sole shareholder of Wire Swiss GmbH.

== App ==
=== Features ===
Wire allows users to exchange text, voice, photo, video and music messages. The application also supports group messaging.

The app allows group calling with up to ten participants. A stereo feature places participants in "virtual space" so that users can differentiate voice directionality. The application adapts to varying network conditions.

The application supports the exchange of animated GIFs up to 5MB through a media integration with a company called Giphy. The iOS and Android versions also include a sketch feature that allows users to draw a sketch into a conversation or over a photo. YouTube, SoundCloud, Spotify and Vimeo integrations allow users to share music and videos within chats.

Wire is available on mobile and web. The web service is called Wire for Web. Wire activity is synced on iOS, Android and web apps. The desktop version supports screen sharing.

Wire also includes a function for ephemeral messaging in 1:1 and group conversations.

With Wire for Teams, Wire introduced a paid product with a series of features available to businesses. It offers the administration of team members: Adding and removing people, assigning roles, and inviting guests to specific chats.

=== Technical ===
Wire provides end-to-end encryption for its instant messages. Wire's instant messages are encrypted with Proteus, a protocol that Wire Swiss developed based on the Signal Protocol. Wire's voice calls are encrypted with DTLS and SRTP, and its video calls with RTP. In addition to this, client-server communication is protected by Transport Layer Security.

== Business model ==
Wire Swiss GmbH receives financial backing from a firm called Iconical. According to an article published by Reuters, Wire Swiss has not disclosed how much funding it has received, and in March 2016, it had yet to discover a sustainable business model. Wire Executive Chairman Janus Friis told Bloomberg that the company will "never create an advertising-based business model", but "might charge for certain premium services in the future".

In July 2017, Wire Swiss announced the beta version of an end-to-end encrypted team messaging platform. In October 2017, Wire officially released the team messaging platform as a subscription based communication solution for small businesses.

== See also ==
- Comparison of instant messaging clients
- Comparison of VoIP software
- Internet privacy
- List of video telecommunication services and product brands
- Secure instant messaging
