= Nikki Hemming =

Australian businesspeople (born 1967)

Nikki Hemming (born 1967) is the CEO and part owner of Sharman Networks and President of LEF Interactive, an agency based in Sydney, Australia, responsible for promoting and developing Kazaa, a peer-to-peer file sharing network, since 2002. As such, she has been a figure in the dispute between peer-to-peer networks and the music industry including a legal case between the Australian Record Industry Association (ARIA) and the Recording Industry Association of America (RIAA).

She is also suing Jon Newton, founder and editor of Canada's p2pnet, for alleged defamation.

== Early career ==
She was born Nicola Anne Hemming in Northampton, England in 1967, and she emigrated to Australia in the early 1990s to work for Virgin Interactive. Hemming had previously worked in setting up offices in Germany, Spain and South Africa as well as working for Virgin Interactive and Grandslam Entertainment in the UK before relocating to Sydney. By 1997, Hemming was the CEO of Sega World, a now defunct theme park in the Darling Harbour district of the city. Sega World cost A$70 million to build but failed to attract sufficient visitors even during the Sydney Olympics. After it closed in 2000, Hemming worked for Viacom for a short while.

== Sharman Networks ==
By 2002, Hemming had established LEF Interactive Pty Ltd, standing for Liberté, Égalité, Fraternité, which would be responsible for managing Sharman Networks.

Sharman Networks was established in Vanuatu, with the stated intention of investing in Internet companies.

In March 2002, Sharman licensed Kazaa and the associated Fasttrack software from company founder Niklas Zennström after Kazaa had been sued by every major record label and movie studio in the US.

As at March 2002, Sharman Networks had a decentralised structure which Hemming had set up. Hemming was the only public figure associated with the company and was widely believed to be the owner. The secretive nature of the new ownership arrangements meant that it took nearly a year for the record and movie industries to have enough information to take legal action against the company.

In the meantime, Kazaa had become popular, reaching an estimated 64 million downloads of the software with four million installations of the program running at any one time. By 2003, Kazaa was the ninth most popular website in the world.

In 2003, a judge in Los Angeles found that Kazaa was subject to US copyright rules. The US Supreme Court found in MGM Studios, Inc. v. Grokster, Ltd. decided during June 2005, that peer-to-peer networks such as Kazaa could be sued for copyright infringement. Although the justices could not agree whether it changed a previous ruling in, what is known as the "Betamax case" Sony Corp. of America v. Universal City Studios, Inc. that it is exempt if there are significant legitimate users of the technology.

Kazaa was originally a party but action was dropped against it because it was based in Vanuatu and Australia. Hemming claims that she has offered to work with the recording industry to develop a secure system to download files. She signed a licensing deal with Altnet and Streamwaves to allow the distribution of 20,000 songs.

Kazaa settled all of its outstanding legal issues together with Janus Friis and Niklas Zennström, the original founders of Kazaa, in August 2006 and all litigation ceased in Australia and the rest of the world.

== Sources ==
- About Sharman Networks page
- ZDNet Australia story on Hemming's plans for Kazaa 24 April 2002
- Woody, Todd (1 February 2003). "The Race to Kill Kazaa". Wired.
- Biography Research Center Online Gale Group Farmington Hills Michigan Retrieved 13 August 2005
- "Pirate queen". The Age. 5 March 2003.
- "report on raids". Sydney Morning Herald. 14 February 2004.
- "Sydney Morning Herald article on evidence by Sharman Director of Technology Phil Morle on the acquisition of Kazaa". Sydney Morning Herald. 8 December 2004.
