= Kazaa =

Defunct peer-to-peer file sharing application

Kazaa Media Desktop
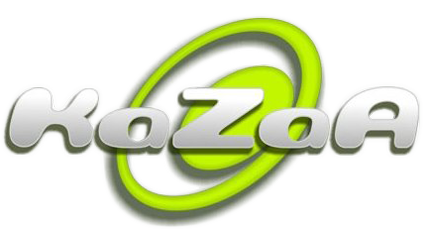

- Developer: Sharman Networks
- Release: March 1, 2001; 25 years ago
- Final release: 3.2.7 / 26 November 2006; 19 years ago
- Operating system: Microsoft Windows
- Type: Peer-to-peer
- License: Proprietary
- Website: www.kazaa.com

Kazaa Media Desktop (/kəˈzɑː/ ka-ZAH; once stylized as "KaZaA", but later usually written "Kazaa") was a peer-to-peer file sharing application using the FastTrack protocol licensed by Joltid Ltd. and operated as Kazaa by Sharman Networks. Kazaa was subsequently under license as a legal music subscription service by Atrinsic, Inc., which lasted until August 2012.

Kazaa Media Desktop was commonly used to exchange MP3 music files and other file types, such as videos, applications, and documents over the Internet. The Kazaa Media Desktop client could be downloaded free of charge; however, it was bundled with adware and for a period there were "No spyware" warnings found on Kazaa's website. During the years of Kazaa's operation, Sharman Networks and its business partners and associates were the target of copyright-related lawsuits, related to the content distributed via Kazaa Media Desktop on the FastTrack protocol.

By August 2012, the Kazaa website was no longer active.

== History ==
Kazaa and FastTrack were originally created and developed by Estonian programmers from BlueMoon Interactive including Jaan Tallinn and sold to Swedish entrepreneur Niklas Zennström and Danish programmer Janus Friis (who were later to create Skype and later still Joost and Rdio). Kazaa was introduced by the Dutch company Consumer Empowerment in March 2001, near the end of the first generation of P2P networks typified by the shutdown of Napster in July 2001. Skype itself was based on Kazaa's P2P backend, which allowed users to make a call by directly connecting them with each other.

Initially, some users of the Kazaa network were users of the Morpheus client program, formerly made available by MusicCity. Eventually, the official Kazaa client became more widespread. In February 2002, when Morpheus developers failed to pay license fees, Kazaa developers used an automatic update ability to shut out Morpheus clients by changing the protocol. Morpheus later became a client of the gnutella network.

== Lawsuits ==
Consumer Empowerment was sued in the Netherlands in 2001 by the Dutch music publishing body, Buma/Stemra. The court ordered Kazaa's owners to take steps to prevent its users from violating copyrights or else pay a heavy fine. In October 2001 a lawsuit was filed against Consumer Empowerment by members of the music and motion picture industry in the US. In response Consumer Empowerment sold the Kazaa application to Sharman Networks, headquartered in Australia and incorporated in Vanuatu. In late March 2002, a Dutch court of appeal reversed an earlier judgment and stated that Kazaa was not responsible for the actions of its users. Buma/Stemra lost its appeal before the Dutch Supreme Court in December 2003.

In 2003, Kazaa signed a deal with Altnet and Streamwaves to try to convert users to paying, legal customers. Searchers on Kazaa were offered a free 30-second sample of songs for which they were searching and directed to sign up for the full-featured Streamwaves service.

However, Kazaa's new owner, Sharman, was sued in Los Angeles by the major record labels and motion pictures studios and a class of music publishers. The other defendants in that case (Grokster and MusicCity, makers of the Morpheus file-sharing software) initially prevailed against the plaintiffs on summary judgment (Sharman joined the case too late to take advantage of that ruling). The summary judgment ruling was upheld by the Ninth Circuit Court of Appeals, but was unanimously reversed by the US Supreme Court in a decision titled MGM Studios, Inc. v. Grokster, Ltd.

Following that ruling in favor of the plaintiff labels and studios, Grokster almost immediately settled the case. Shortly thereafter, on 27 July 2006, it was announced that Sharman had also settled with the record industry and motion picture studios. As part of that settlement, the company agreed to pay $100 million in damages to the four major music companies—Universal Music, Sony BMG, EMI and Warner Music—and an undisclosed amount to the studios. Sharman also agreed to convert Kazaa into a legal music download service. Like the creators of similar products, Kazaa's owners have been taken to court by music publishing bodies to restrict its use in the sharing of copyrighted material.

While the US action was still pending, the record industry commenced proceedings against Sharman on its home turf. In February 2004, the Australian Record Industry Association (ARIA) announced its own legal action against Kazaa, alleging massive copyright breaches. The trial began on 29 November 2004. On 6 February 2005, the homes of two Sharman Networks executives and the offices of Sharman Networks in Australia were raided under a court order by ARIA to gather evidence for the trial.

On 5 September 2005, the Federal Court of Australia issued a landmark ruling that Sharman, though not itself guilty of copyright infringement, had "authorized" Kazaa users illegally to swap copyrighted songs. The court ruled six defendants—including Kazaa's owners Sharman Networks, Sharman's Sydney-based boss Nikki Hemming and associate Kevin Bermeister—had knowingly allowed Kazaa users illegally to swap copyrighted songs. The company was ordered to modify the software within two months (a ruling enforceable only in Australia). Sharman and the other five parties faced paying millions of dollars in damages to the record labels that instigated the legal action.

On 5 December 2005, the Federal Court of Australia ceased downloads of Kazaa in Australia after Sharman Networks failed to modify their software by the 5 December deadline. Users with an Australian IP address were greeted with the message "Important Notice: The download of the Kazaa Media Desktop by users in Australia is not permitted" when visiting the Kazaa website. Sharman planned to appeal against the Australian decision, but ultimately settled the case as part of its global settlement with the record labels and studios in the United States.

In yet another set of related cases, in September 2003, the Recording Industry Association of America (RIAA) filed suit in civil court against several private individuals who had shared large numbers of files with Kazaa; most of these suits were settled with monetary payments averaging $3,000. Sharman Networks responded with a lawsuit against the RIAA, alleging that the terms of use of the network were violated and that unauthorized client software (such as Kazaa Lite) was used in the investigation to track down the individual file sharers. An effort to throw out this suit was denied in January 2004. However, that suit was also settled in 2006 (see above).

Separately, in Duluth, Minnesota, the recording industry sued Jammie Thomas-Rasset, a 30-year-old single mother. On 5 October 2007, Thomas was ordered to pay the six record companies (Sony BMG, Arista Records LLC, Interscope Records, UMG Recordings Inc., Capitol Records Inc. and Warner Bros. Records Inc.) $9,250 for each of the 24 songs they had focused on in this case. She was accused of sharing a total of 1,702 songs through her Kazaa account. Along with attorney fees, this would have cost Thomas half a million dollars. Thomas testified that she does not have a Kazaa account, but her testimony was complicated by the fact that she had replaced her computer's hard drive after the alleged downloading took place, and later than she originally said in a pre-trial deposition. Thomas-Rasset appealed the verdict and was given a new trial. In June 2009 that jury awarded the recording industry plaintiffs a judgment of $80,000 per song, or $1.92 million. This is less than half of the $150,000 amount authorized by statute. The federal court found the award "monstrous and shocking" and reduced it to $54,000. The recording industry offered to accept a settlement of $25,000, with the money going to charities that support musicians. Apparently undaunted, Thomas-Rasset was able to obtain a third trial on the issue of damages. In November 2010 she was again ordered to pay for her violation, this time $62,500 per song, for a total of $1.5 million. Her attorneys raised a challenge to the constitutional validity of massive statutory damages, where actual damages would have been $24. But this challenge was rejected by the supreme court in 2013. The final judgement against Thomas-Rasset was $222,000.

== Bundled malware ==
In 2006 StopBadware.org identified Kazaa as a spyware application. They identified the following components:

- Cydoor (spyware): Collects information on the PC's surfing habits and passes it on to Cydoor Desktop Media.
- B3D (adware): An add-on which causes advertising popups if the PC accesses a website which triggers the B3D code.
- Altnet (adware): A distribution network for paid "gold" files.
- The Best Offers (adware): Tracks user's browsing habits and internet usage to display advertisements similar to their interests.
- InstaFinder (hijacker): Redirects URL typing errors to InstaFinder's web page instead of the standard search page.
- TopSearch (adware): Displays paid songs and media related to a Kazaa search.
- RX Toolbar (spyware): The toolbar monitors all sites visited with Microsoft Internet Explorer and provides links to competitors' websites.
- New.net (hijacker): A browser plugin that allowed users to access several of its own unofficial Top Level Domain names, e.g., .chat and .shop. The main purpose of this was to sell domain names such as www.record.shop which is actually www.record.shop.new.net (ICANN did not allow third-party registration of generic top level domains until 2012).

In response, "clean" third-party clients such as Kazaa Lite (which also provided slightly extended functionality) gained popularity with Kazaa users. First released in April 2002, by mid-2005 Kazaa Lite was almost as widely used as the official Kazaa client itself. As it connected to the same FastTrack network, it could exchange files with all Kazaa users.

== Transitional period ==
Kazaa's legal issues ended after a settlement of $100 million in reparations to the recording industry. Without further recourse, and until the lawsuit was settled, the RIAA actively sued thousands of people across the US for sharing copyrighted music over the network. Particularly, students were targeted and most were threatened with a penalty of $750 per song. Although the lawsuits were mainly in the US, other countries also began to follow suit. Beginning in 2008, however, RIAA announced an end to individual lawsuits.

While Napster lasted just three years, Kazaa survived much longer. However, the lawsuits (and a failed venture into a legal, monthly music subscription service similar to Napster) eventually ended the company.

== See also ==
- Bearshare – Peer-to-peer file sharing application
- eMule – Free peer-to-peer file sharing application for Microsoft Windows
- iMesh – Defunct file sharing client
- LimeWire – Peer-to-peer file sharing application
- Napster – Online peer-to-peer file sharing software
- The Pirate Bay – Website providing torrent files and magnet links
- WinMX – Freeware peer-to-peer file sharing program
- μTorrent – Proprietary adware BitTorrent client
