= State (website) =

Web platform aimed at using natural language processing to facilitate opinion sharing

State.com
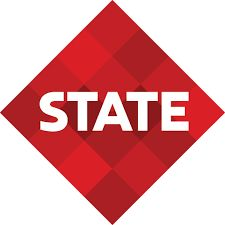
- Website type: Opinion poll, Global opinion network
- Available in: English
- Owner: Equal Media Ltd.
- Website: state.com
- Registration: Optional
- Launched: 2014; 12 years ago
- Current status: Defunct

State was a semantic web platform created by London, UK-based Equal Media Ltd. It was announced in 2013 and launched in 2014.

According to the company, the platform aimed to build a global opinion network using natural language processing, databases and sentiment analysis. The company stated that the service sought to democratize online conversations by assigning equal weight to individual user opinions.

By 2020, the service had become inactive and in 2024 Equal Media Ltd was dissolved.

In 2025, a new version of the platform was launched under the name Collective Thinking using the same domain name. This is a separate product from the one discussed on this page.

== History ==
Equal Media was founded by Jawbone founder Alex Asseily and his brother Mark Asseily, who raised $14 million in seed financing in May 2012 from funders such as Atomico.

State launched in closed alpha in May 2013 with around 10,000 users and at TechCrunch Disrupt in September 2013 it launched an invite-only beta release. When State launched its mobile app and the platform to the public in February 2014, it had about 30 employees, most of whom worked at headquarters in London. It also had an office in San Francisco.

Its advisors included Sir Tim Berners-Lee, Deepak Chopra, Troy Carter, Eli Pariser, Andrew Paulson, and Nigel Shadbolt.

== Features ==
State had a large dictionary of "headlines", or structured expressions organized semantically. This allowed users to opine more specifically, as Asseily explained: "The world isn’t as thumbs-up/thumbs-down as we may have imagined. They are adding texture to their opinions." Furthermore, users could “tune”—i.e., follow—in to specific topics such as politics or technology, and could also import friends from Facebook, Google Plus, and Twitter. Because opinions were computer-readable, they could automatically be summarized and cross-referenced.

Re/code writer Liz Gannes described it as an "interest graph" startup.

== Business model ==
Asseily envisioned State "eventually becom[ing] a research-on-demand service" providing insights into public opinion accessible to researchers and organizations. For example, "insights reports" based on aggregated opinions could "aim to capture sentiment about a concept, brand, or event, which [were initially] free for State users".

Examples of such insights included the following: State users generally viewed "Facebook as a whole" negatively while opinions of the company's new Paper app were overwhelmingly positive. Regarding the surveillance disclosures by Edward Snowden, some people held conflicted opinions towards Edward Snowden and the Prism programme. As Asseily explained, "In general terms, some people who thought Snowden was a villain, also thought Prism was bad and likewise, some thought Snowden was a hero but that Prism was a good thing".
