= NextGenTel =

Norwegian telecommunications company

- Company type: Private
- Industry: Telecommunication
- Founded: 2000
- Headquarters: Bergen, Norway
- Key people: Sondre Aarrestad (CEO)
- Services: Broadband; IPTV; Telephony
- Parent: NextGenTel Holding
- Website: www.nextgentel.no

NextGenTel is a Norwegian telecommunications company headquartered in Bergen, with offices in Trondheim, Oslo, Stavanger, and Kristiansand. They offer ADSL, SHDSL, ADSL2+, VDSL2, IPTV, IP Telephony, mobilephone subscriptions, and WiMax solutions. Wth 140,000 customers they are Norway's third-largest Internet service provider after Telenor and Altibox.

The company was established on March 1, 2000 delivering Internet via ADSL. It has since expanded to Internet and TV solutions (triple play) over fiber and wireless broadband to private households and housing associations.

NextGenTel was acquired by Swedish-Finnish telecommunications company TeliaSonera in May 2006. In December 2012, the company was acquired by Telio. Since 2019, NextGenTel has been a fully owned subsidiary of Telecom 3 Holding AS.
