= Vdio =

2013 Internet television service

Vdio Inc.
- Website type: Video on demand
- Available in: English & French
- Website: www.vdio.com
- Commercial: No
- Launched: April 2, 2013
- Current status: Suspended operations.
- Content license: United States, UK & Canada

Vdio Inc. was an internet television service created by Skype and Rdio co-founder Janus Friis in 2011. On April 2, 2013, Vdio was officially launched for Rdio premium subscribers. Vdio's platform for sharing content was a pay-per-view system compared to Rdio's unlimited streaming. Similar to the main players in the video streaming market, Amazon and Netflix, Vdio offered a varied catalog that ranges from cult classic titles to new releases from major studios. From April 2013, the service was available in the United States and the United Kingdom (though it has now been discontinued). Current Rdio subscribers were given US$25 in credit to spend on Vdio.

On August 6, 2013, they relaunched the Vdio service in Canada check at Blog Rdio Canada. Later, it became available to the United States, United Kingdom and Canada until the video service was ultimately suspended in all 3 countries. After closing, Vdio's url re-directed to the main Rdio website.

Several of Friis' other companies, including the video-focused startup Joost, used peer-to-peer technology to achieve lower cost content delivery.

On December 27, 2013, Vdio announced over email that it was discontinuing its beta program, citing that it was not able to provide the "differentiated customer experience we had hoped for". They also posted a short document for existing customers.
