= PowerReviews =

American consumer reviews software company

- Type: Subsidiary
- Industry: Marketing technology
- Founded: 2005
- Headquarters: Chicago, Illinois, USA
- Area served: Worldwide
- Products: Ratings and reviews software
- Parent: Syndigo (via 1WorldSync)
- Website: www.powerreviews.com

PowerReviews is a business software development company based in Chicago, Illinois. It provides software to brands and retailers that allow them to collect, display and analyze different forms of user-generated content (UGC) on their e-commerce websites.

The company's software allows product ratings and reviews, answering customer questions, product sampling, images, videos, and social content, and analytics tools to examine the impact of user-generated content and to benchmark product performance.

PowerReviews is headquartered in Chicago with an office in London. The London office services Europe, the Middle East and Africa.

== History ==
=== Founding and sale to Bazaarvoice ===
PowerReviews was founded in Chicago in 2005. By 2012 it had acquired $37 million in funding from among others from Menlo Ventures, Draper Richards, Lehman Brothers, Tenaya Capital, and Four Rivers Group.

Bazaarvoice, a competitor, bought PowerReviews in 2012. The transaction was announced on 24 May 2012 at a reported value of about $151 million and closed on 12 June 2012. In the complaint it later filed to challenge the deal, the United States Department of Justice put the total consideration, including both cash and non-cash components, at approximately $168.2 million. Because the deal fell below the reporting thresholds of the Hart–Scott–Rodino Antitrust Improvements Act, it was not notified to the antitrust agencies in advance, and the Department of Justice opened its investigation only after the acquisition had closed.

The acquisition was opposed by the United States Department of Justice for antitrust concerns, focused on the ratings and review industry's relatively small marketplace and the potential importance to adjacent industries.

In 2014, consumer reviews company Viewpoints purchased PowerReviews from Bazaarvoice. The two companies combined under the PowerReviews name.

PowerReviews subsequently acquired BzzAgent from Dunnhumby in July 2018 and Stella Pulse from StellaService in July 2019.

In August 2023, PowerReviews was purchased again, this time by 1WorldSync, a product content management technology company.
