= EMI Songbook Series =

Compilation album series

The EMI Songbook Series is a series of 10 compact disc compilation albums released by EMI in 1998 - 1999. Each disc features songs specifically chosen by a notable cult figure from 20th century popular culture. The sleeve work for each disc frequently includes essays, illustrations or other contributions from the featured individual. Clive Barker compiled a CD for this series which included music from Danny Elfman, Diamanda Galás... etc. Hunter S. Thompson and Robert Crumb provided two of the most acclaimed compilations in the series.

== Albums ==
- Hunter S. Thompson - Where Were You When the Fun Stopped?
- Iain Banks - Personal Effects
- Gerry Anderson - Evocation
- Clive Barker - Being Music
- Gilbert Shelton - Honky Soul, Race Music, Hard Bop & Anachronic Jazz
- Peter Bagge - Rockin' Poppin' Favorites
- Ralph Steadman - I Like It
- Robert Crumb - That's What I Call Sweet Music
- Savage Pencil - The Antiquack - Dead Duck Selection
- Ivor Cutler - Cute, (H)ey?

== Hunter S. Thompson's selections ==
Hunter S. Thompson's compilation album is titled Where Were You When the Fun Stopped? It contains eighteen tracks, listed below.

1. Ballad of Thunder Road - Robert Mitchum
2. I Smell a Rat - Howlin' Wolf
3. Spirit in the Sky - Norman Greenbaum
4. The Hula Hula Boys - Warren Zevon
5. Maggie May - Rod Stewart
6. The Wild Side of Life/It Wasn't God Who Made Honky Tonk Angels - Hank Thompson, Tanya Tucker, Kitty Wells
7. Will the Circle Be Unbroken - Nitty Gritty Dirt Band
8. Mr. Tambourine Man - Bob Dylan
9. Walk on the Wild Side - Lou Reed
10. If I Had a Boat - Lyle Lovett
11. Stars on the Water - Rodney Crowell
12. Carmelita - Flaco Jimenez, Dwight Yoakam
13. Why Don't We Get Drunk - Jimmy Buffett
14. American Pie - Don McLean
15. White Rabbit - Jefferson Airplane
16. The Weight - The Band
17. Melissa - The Allman Brothers Band
18. Battle Hymn of the Republic - Herbie Mann
