= Atomico =

London-based venture capital firm

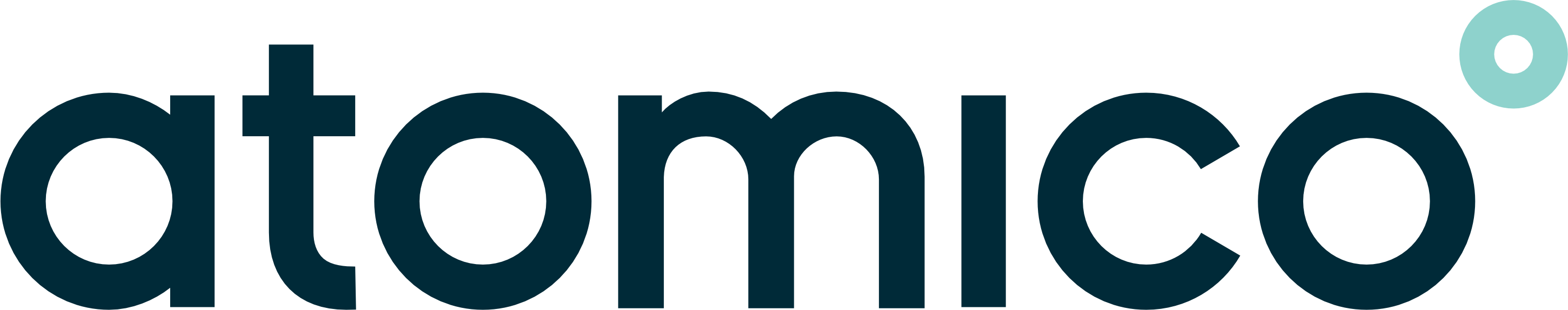
- Company type: Private
- Industry: Venture capital
- Founded: 2006; 20 years ago
- Founder: Niklas Zennström
- Products: Venture capital, growth capital
- Number of employees: 57
- Website: www.atomico.com

Atomico is a European Venture Capital firm headquartered in London, with offices in Paris, Berlin and Stockholm. Its founder and CEO is Niklas Zennström, a serial entrepreneur who co-founded Skype and Kazaa.

== History and investments ==
It has invested in more than 155 companies across the globe via 7 funds, Atomico Ventures I, the $165 million Atomico Ventures II, Atomico III, which closed at $476 million in November 2013, the $765 million Atomico IV, the $820 million Atomico V, the $1.1 billion Atomico VI, and most recently, the $1.24 billion Atomico VII. The company publishes an annual report into the European technology industry.

Areas of interest for Atomico, include Industrial Automation, Internet Infrastructure & Security, and Future of Food. Notable growth investments in these categories include CADDi ($38 million Series C), Lakera ($20 million Series A led by Atomico), and FarmDrop (£7 million Series A).

The company has been involved with exits or substantial transactions in companies including Supercell (sold a majority stake to SoftBank, valuing the business at $3 billion in 2013), The Climate Corporation (acquired by Monsanto for $1.1 billion in 2013), Xobni (acquired by Yahoo! in 2013), PowerReviews (acquired by Bazaarvoice in 2012), Rovio's $1 billion IPO in September 2017, and LendInvest's IPO on the London Stock Exchange in July 2021.

== See also ==
- List of venture capital firms
