= EMI =

British music recording and publishing company

EMI Group Limited
- Final logo used from 2003 to 2012

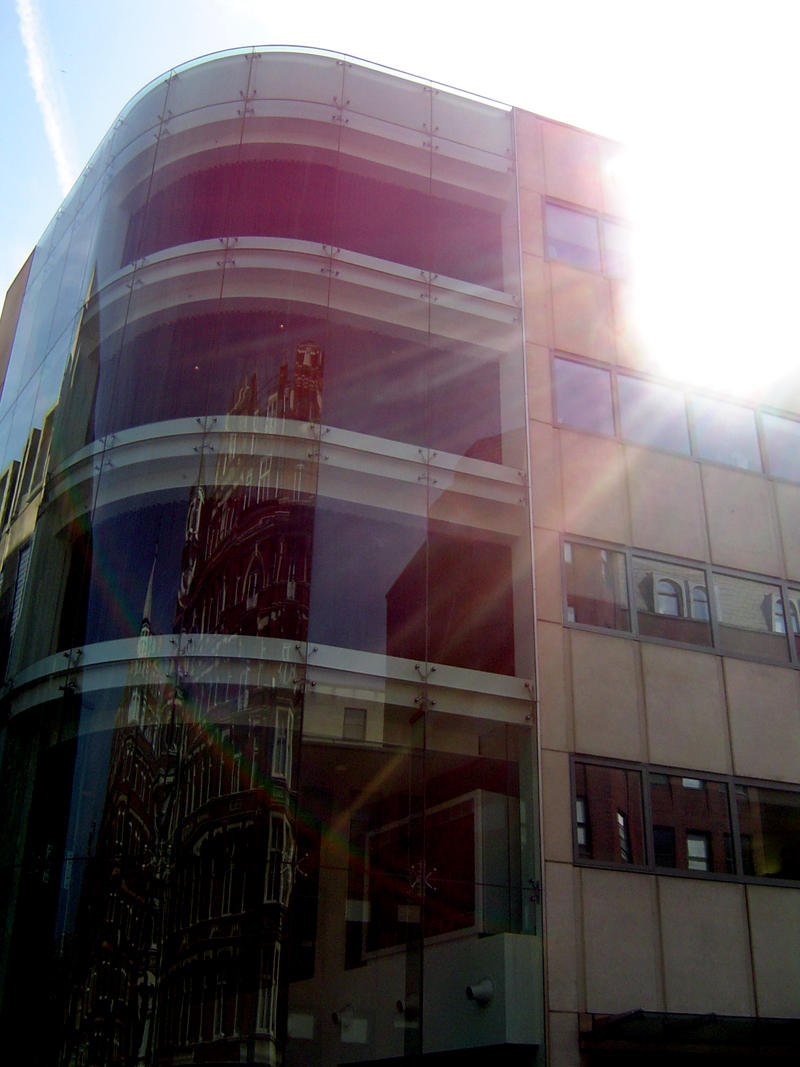
- EMI's former building in London, since owned by Warner Music UK
- Formerly: Electric and Musical Industries Ltd. (1931–1971); EMI Limited (1971–1979); Thorn EMI Limited (1979–1980); Thorn EMI plc (1980–1996); EMI Group plc (1996–2007)
- Type: Public (until 2007); Private (after 2007)
- Traded as: LSE: EMI (until 2007)
- ISIN: GB0000444736 (until 2007)
- Industry: Music
- Predecessors: Columbia Graphophone Company; Gramophone Company
- Founded: 31 March 1931; 95 years ago
- Defunct: 28 September 2012; 14 years ago
- Fate: Split up: EMI Music Publishing acquired by a consortium led by Sony Music Publishing comprising; Sony Corporation of America; The estate of Michael Jackson; Mubadala Development Company PJSC; Jynwel Capital Limited; The Blackstone Group's GSO Capital Partners LP; David Geffen (later wholly owned by and absorbed into Sony/ATV); Warner Music Group acquired Parlophone, Chrysalis Records (UK artists and Ramones catalogue until 2016), EMI Classics, Virgin Classics, 2CD Originals Series and EMI's Belgian, Czech/Slovak, Danish, French, Norwegian, Polish, Portuguese, Spanish and Swedish operations (including Russian EMI partner SBA/Gala and Chinese EMI partner Gold Typhoon); Universal Music Group acquired Capitol Records, Virgin Records, The Blue Note Label Group, Positiva Records and most of the international operations amongst the bulk.; BMG Rights Management acquired Mute Records and Virgin Music Publishing; Blue Raincoat Music (parent since 2019 is Reservoir Media Management) in 2016 acquired the Chrysalis British catalogue (except 3 artists and Ramones)
- Successors: EMI Music Publishing; Virgin EMI Records (later split into EMI Records and its imprint, Virgin Records); EMI Records Nashville; Minos EMI; Studios 301; EMI Recorded Music Australia
- Headquarters: Westminster, London, England, United Kingdom
- Area served: Worldwide
- Key people: Founding CEO Lenard John Brown; Roger Faxon (Former CEO); Ruth Prior (Former CFO)
- Revenue: £1.072 billion (2009) $1.65 billion (2009)
- Operating income: £163 million (2009) (EMI Music) £135 million (2009) (EMI Music Publishing)
- Owners: Terra Firma Capital Partners (2007–2011); Citigroup (2011 – 28 September 2012); Universal Music Group (since 28 September 2012) (EMI Group); Sony Music Publishing (since 28 September 2012) (EMI Music Publishing); Warner Music Group (since 1 July 2013) (EMI Records Ltd; renamed Parlophone Records Ltd.)
- Number of employees: 5,500 (2008)
- Divisions: List of EMI labels
- Subsidiaries: EMI Records; Virgin Records; Capitol Records; Parlophone
- Website: www.universalmusic.com/label/emi/

EMI Group Limited (formerly EMI Group plc until 2007; originally an initialism for Electric and Musical Industries, abbreviated as EMI) was a British transnational conglomerate founded in March 1931 in London. At the time of its acquisition by Universal Music in 2012, it was the fourth largest business group and record label conglomerate in the music industry, and was one of the "Big Four" record companies (later the "Big Three"). Its labels included EMI Records, Parlophone, Virgin Records, and Capitol Records. Following EMI's dissolve, most were acquired by Universal Music Group. Parlophone was acquired by Warner Music.

EMI was listed on the London Stock Exchange, and was also once a constituent of the FTSE 100 Index, but faced financial problems and was sold to Terra Firma Capital Partners in 2007. After the acquisition, EMI underwent a profound restructuring and became a private company. During Terra Firma's ownership, EMI accumulated around $4billion in debt. This led to its acquisition by Citigroup in February 2011. Citigroup's ownership was temporary, as EMI announced in November 2011 that it would sell its music arm to Vivendi's Universal Music Group for $1.9 billion and its publishing business to a Sony/ATV consortium for around $2.2 billion. Other members of the Sony consortium include the estate of Michael Jackson, the Blackstone Group, and the Abu Dhabi–owned Mubadala Development Company. Following the sale, EMI's locations in the United Kingdom, the United States, and Canada were divested to reduce debt.

EMI Music Publishing is owned by Sony Music Publishing, the music publishing division of Sony Music which bought another 70% stake in EMI Music Publishing 2018.

== History ==
Electric and Musical Industries Ltd was formed in March 1931 by the merger of the Columbia Graphophone Company and the Gramophone Company, with its "His Master's Voice" record label, firms that have a history extending back to the origins of recorded sound. The company produced sound recordings as well as recording and playback equipment.

The company's gramophone manufacturing led to 40 years of success with larger-scale electronics and electrical engineering.

In October 1979, EMI merged with Thorn Electrical Industries to create Thorn EMI.

On 16 August 1996, Thorn EMI shareholders voted in favour of demerging Thorn from EMI. The company became EMI Group plc, and the electronics and rentals divisions were divested as Thorn plc.

The company was divided and sold in 2012.

== Electronics research and development ==
=== Television ===
In 1934, an EMI research team led by Sir Isaac Shoenberg developed the electronic Marconi-EMI system for television broadcasting, which replaced Baird's electro-mechanical system following its introduction in 1936. After the Second World War, EMI resumed its involvement in broadcast equipment production, providing the BBC's second television transmitter at Sutton Coldfield. It also manufactured broadcast television cameras for British television production companies and the BBC. The commercial television ITV companies also used them alongside cameras made by Pye and Marconi. Their most commercially successful piece of equipment was the EMI 2001 colour television camera, which was widely used in the British television industry from the end of the 1960s until the early 1990s. Exports of this piece of equipment were low, however, and EMI left this area of product manufacture.

=== Blumlein and radar ===
EMI engineer Alan Blumlein received a patent for the invention of stereophonic sound in 1931. He was killed in 1942 whilst conducting flight trials on an experimental H2S radar set.

During and after World War II, the EMI Laboratories in Hayes, Hillingdon developed radar equipment (including the receiver section of the British Army's GL-II anti-aircraft fire-control radar), microwave devices such as the reflex klystron oscillator (having played a crucial role in the development of early production types following on from the British Admiralty Signal School's pioneering NR89, the so-called "Sutton tube"), electro-optic devices such as infra-red image converters, and eventually guided missiles employing analogue computers.

=== Photomultipliers ===
For many years, the company was internationally respected as a photomultiplier manufacturer. This part of the business was transferred to Thorn as part of Thorn-EMI, then later became the independent concern Electron Tubes Ltd.

=== Computers and CT scanner ===
The EMI Electronic Business Machine, a valve and magnetic drum memory computer, was built in the 1950s to process the British Motor Corporation payroll.

In 1958, the EMIDEC 1100, the UK's first commercially available all-transistor computer, was developed at EMI's Central Research Laboratories in Hayes under the leadership of Godfrey Hounsfield, an electrical engineer at EMI.

In the early 1970s, with financial support by the UK Department of Health and Social Security as well as EMI research investment, Hounsfield developed the first CT scanner, a device which revolutionised medical imaging. In 1973, EMI was awarded a prestigious Queen's Award for Technological Innovation for what was then called the EMI scanner; in 1979, Hounsfield won the Nobel Prize for his accomplishment.

After brief success in the medical imaging field, EMI's manufacturing activities were sold off to other companies, such as Thorn (see Thorn EMI). Subsequently, development and manufacturing activities were sold off to other companies and work relocated.

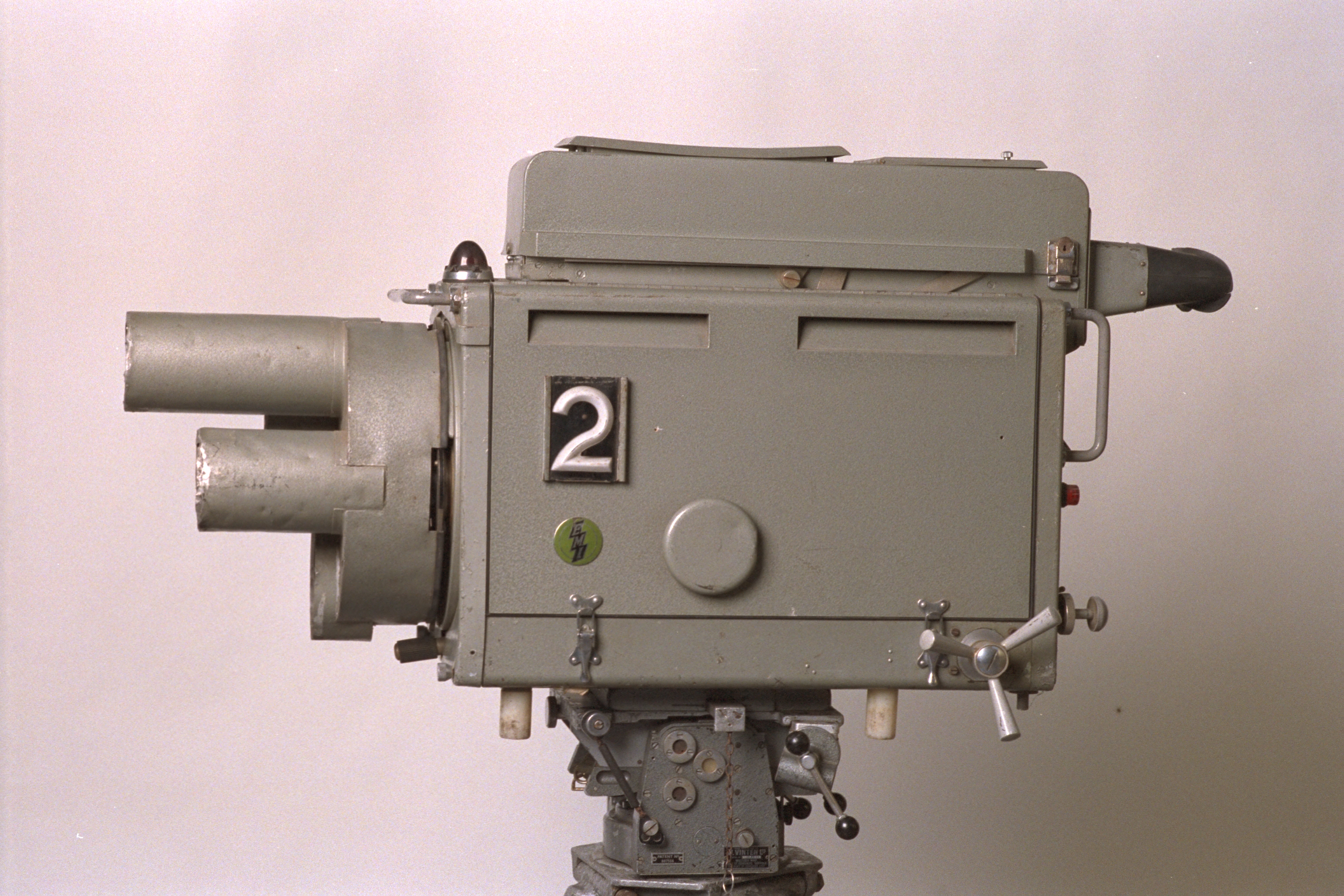
Emitron television camera

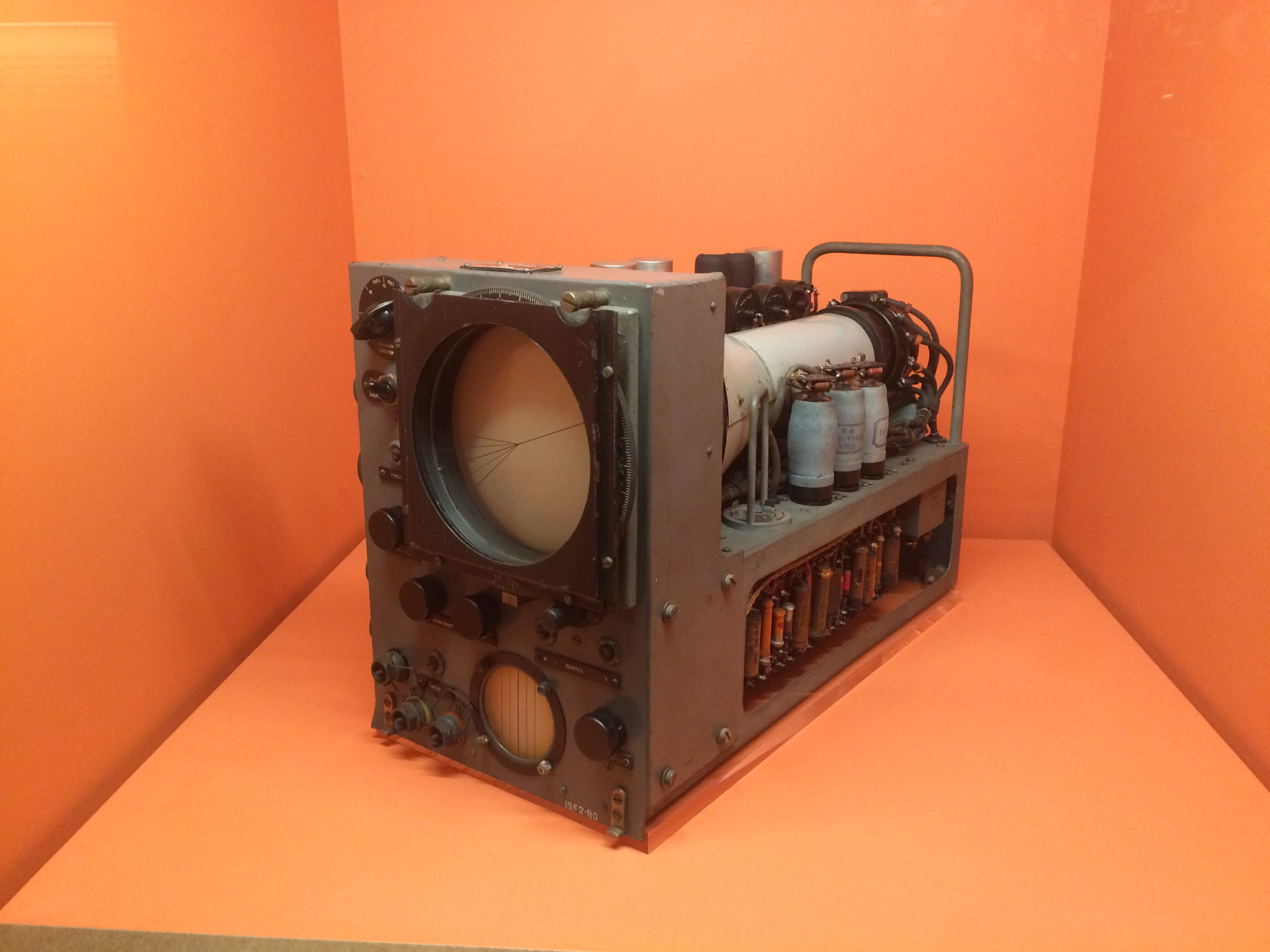
H2S radar display set

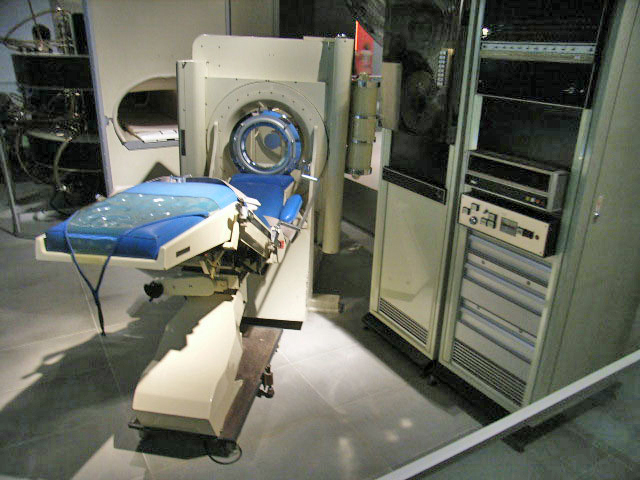
First commercially available CT scanner made by EMI

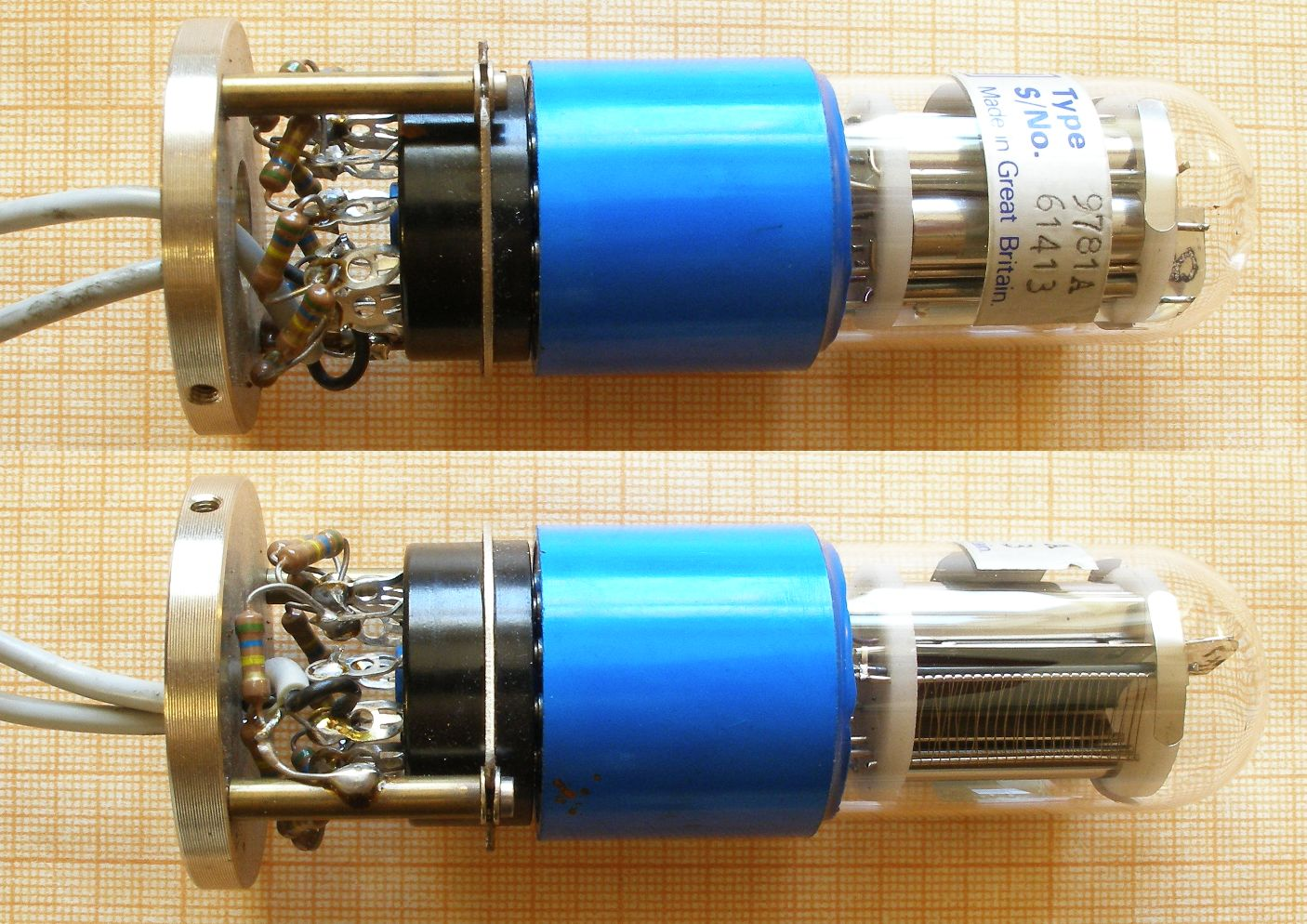
EMI photomultiplier tubes

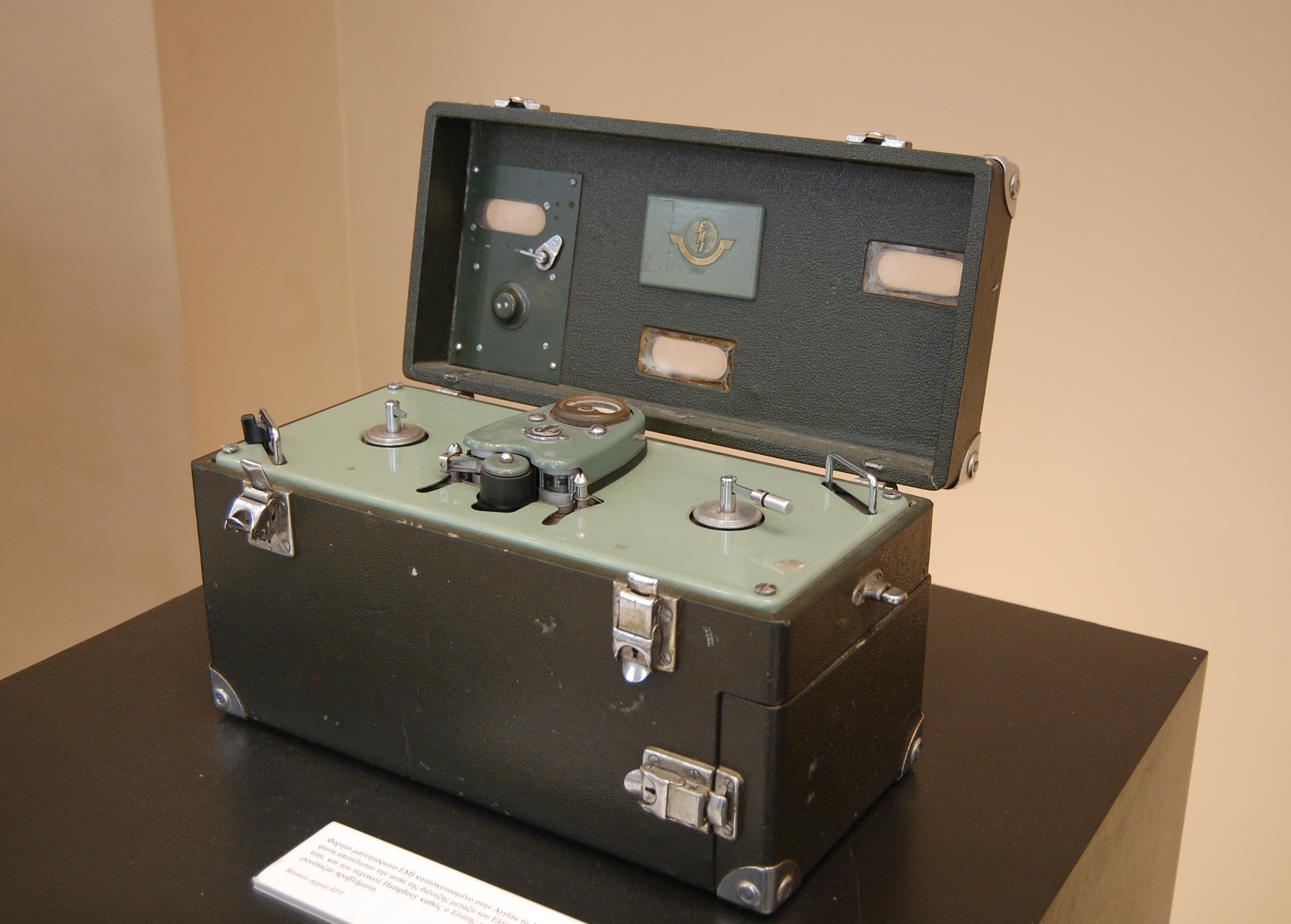
EMI tape recorder

=== Emihus ===
Emihus Electronics, based in Glenrothes, Scotland, was owned 51% by Hughes Aircraft, of California, US, and 49% by EMI. It manufactured integrated circuits, electrolytic capacitors and, for a short period in the mid-1970s, hand-held calculators under the Gemini name.

== Music ==
Early in its life, the Gramophone Company established its subsidiary operations and branch offices in a number of many other countries inside and outside of the British Commonwealth, including Europe, the Middle East and Africa as well as in Canada, Russia, India, China, Japan, Australia and New Zealand. Gramophone's (later EMI's) Australian and New Zealand subsidiaries dominated the popular music industries in those countries across the Asia-Pacific region from the 1920s until the 1960s, when other locally owned labels (such as Festival Records) began to challenge the near monopoly of EMI. Over 150,000 78-rpm recordings from around the world are held in EMI's temperature-controlled archive in Hayes, some of which have been released on CD since 2008 by Honest Jon's Records.

In 1931, the year the company was formed, it opened the legendary recording studios at London's Abbey Road. During the 1930s and 1940s, its roster of artists included Arturo Toscanini, Sir Edward Elgar, and Otto Klemperer, among many others. During this time EMI appointed its first A&R managers. These included George Martin, who later brought the Beatles into the EMI fold.

When the Gramophone Company merged with the Columbia Graphophone Company (including Columbia's subsidiary label Parlophone) in 1931, the new Anglo-American group was incorporated as Electric & Musical Industries Limited. At this point, the Radio Corporation of America had a majority shareholding in the new company due to RCA purchasing the Victor Talking Machine Company in 1929. Victor owned 50% of the British affiliated Gramophone Company, giving RCA chairman David Sarnoff a seat on the EMI board.

EMI subsequently sold to Columbia USA due to anti-trust action taken by its American competitors.

RCA sold its stake in EMI in 1935, but due to its 1929 takeover of Victor, RCA retained the North and South American rights to the "His Master's Voice" trademark.

In 1938, ARC-Brunswick was taken over by CBS, which then sold the American Brunswick label to American Decca Records, which along with its other properties, Vocalion Records and Aeolian Vocalion Records, used it as a subsidiary budget label afterward. CBS then operated Columbia as its flagship label in both the United States and Canada.

EMI retained the rights to the Columbia name in most other territories including the UK, Australia and New Zealand. It continued to operate the label with moderate success until 1973, when it was retired and replaced by the EMI Records imprint, making records with the Columbia Records label manufactured outside North America between 1972 and 1992 rare.

In 1990, following a series of major takeovers that saw CBS Records acquired by the Sony of Japan, EMI sold its remaining rights to the Columbia name to Sony and the label is now operated exclusively throughout the world by Sony Music Entertainment; the exception being Japan, where the trade mark is owned by Columbia Music Entertainment.

EMI released its first LPs in 1952 and its first stereophonic recordings in 1955 (first on reel-to-reel tape and then LPs, beginning in 1958). In 1957, to replace the loss of its long-established licensing arrangements with RCA Victor and Columbia Records (Columbia USA cut its ties with EMI in 1951), EMI entered the American market by acquiring 96% of the stock for Capitol Records USA.

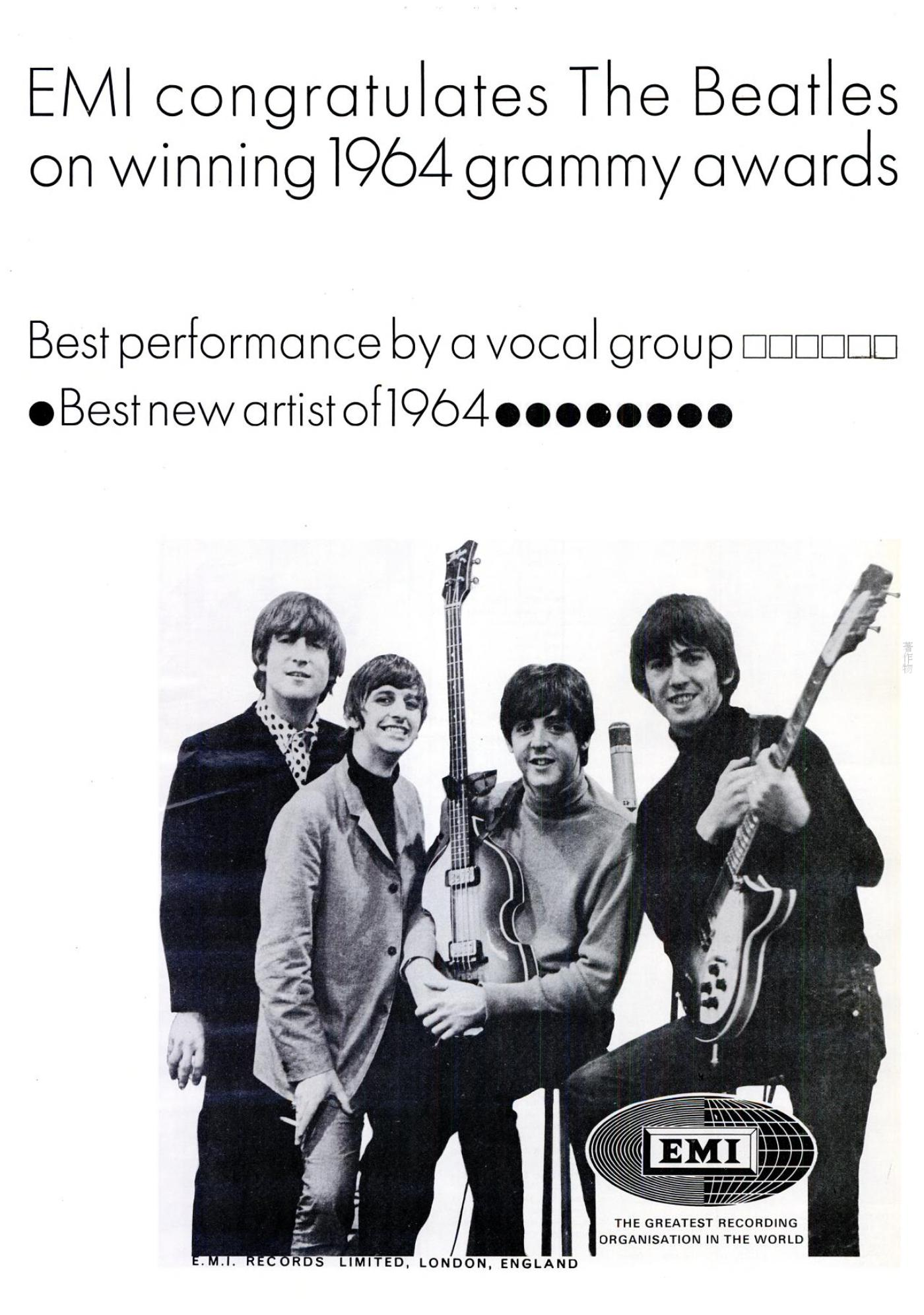
Trade ad of congratulations to the Beatles for their 1964 Grammys

From 1960 to 1995, its "EMI House" corporate headquarters was located at 20 Manchester Square London, England, the stairwell from which was featured on the cover of the Beatles' Please Please Me album. In addition, an unused shot from the Please Please Me photo session, featuring the boys in short hair and clean cut attire, was used for the cover of the Beatles' first double-disc greatest-hits compilation entitled 1962–1966 (also known as "The Red Album"). In 1969, Angus McBean took a matching group photograph featuring the boys in long hair and beards to contrast with the earlier clean cut image to show that the boys could have appeal across a wide range of audiences. This photo was originally intended for the Get Back album which later was entitled Let It Be. The photo was used instead for the cover of the Beatles' second greatest-hits double-disc compilation entitled 1967–1970 (also known as "The Blue Album"). (The two compilations were released in 1973.)

EMI's classical artists of the period were largely limited to the prestigious British and European orchestras, such as the Philharmonia Orchestra and London Symphony Orchestra as well as the Choir of King's College, Cambridge. During the era of the long-playing record (LP), very few American and Canadian orchestras had their principal recording contracts with EMI, one notable exception being that of the Pittsburgh Symphony Orchestra, especially during the tenure of William Steinberg.

From the late 1950s to the early 1970s, the company enjoyed huge success in the popular music field under the management of Sir Joseph Lockwood. The strong combination of EMI and its subsidiary labels (including Parlophone, His Master's Voice, Columbia and Capitol Records) along with a roster of stellar groups such as the Hollies, the Shadows, the Beach Boys and the Beatles along with hit solo performers such as Frank Sinatra, Cliff Richard, and Nat 'King' Cole, made EMI the best-known and most successful recording company in the world at that time.

In 1967, while shifting its focus on pop and rock music roster to Columbia and Parlophone, EMI converted HMV solely to a classical music label exclusively. For the emerging progressive rock genre including Pink Floyd, who had debuted on Columbia, EMI established a new subsidiary label, Harvest Records, two years later.

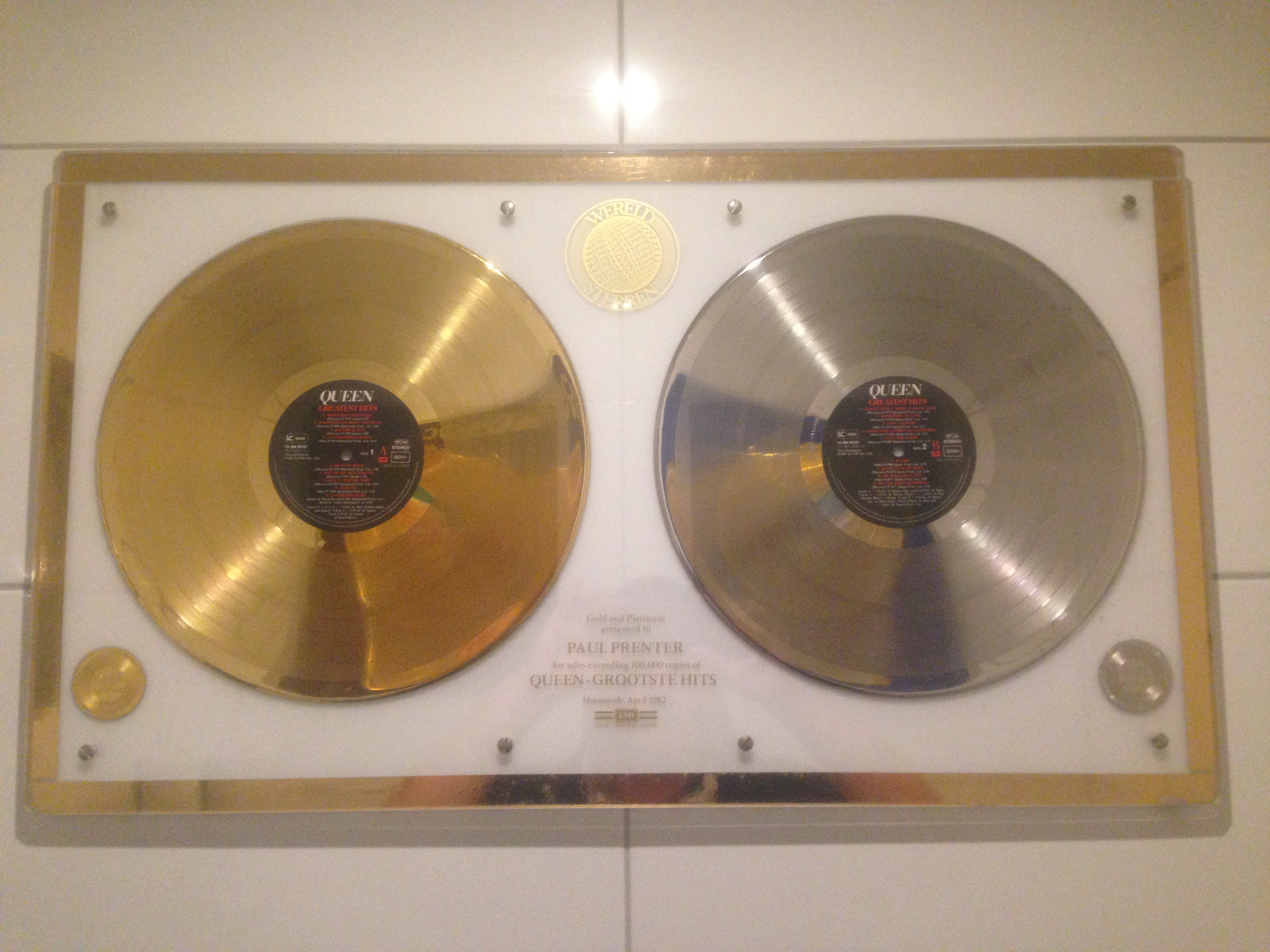
Gold and silver discs issued by EMI in 1982 for Queen's Greatest Hits

In 1971, Electric & Musical Industries changed its name to EMI Ltd. and on 1 January 1973 EMI phased out most of its heritage labels and replacing them with the EMI imprint. On 1 July 1973 the Gramophone Company subsidiary (The Gramophone Co. Ltd.) was renamed EMI Records Ltd as well, and in 1978, EMI launched EMI America Records as its second label in the United States after Capitol. In July of the same year, EMI Ltd. reorganized its record division, unifying and restructuring its worldwide music operations under the newly formed division, EMI Music. Initially, EMI Music consisted of two operational arms: "EMI Music Europe and International," headquartered in London and headed by EMI Records Ltd., which covered all interests outside of North America; and "EMI Music Worldwide," based in Hollywood and headed by its principal U.S. subsidiary, Capitol Industries-EMI Inc. (later Capitol-EMI Music, Inc.), which covered the music group's interests in North America. In February 1979, EMI Ltd acquired United Artists Records and with it its subsidiary labels Liberty Records and Imperial Records. Eight months later, Thorn Electrical Industries merged with EMI Ltd. to form Thorn EMI.

Sometime in the late 1980s, EMI America merged with sister label Manhattan Records, founded in 1984, becoming EMI Manhattan and eventually EMI USA when Capitol absorbed it in 1989.

Also in 1989, Thorn EMI bought a 50% interest in Chrysalis Records, completing the buyout two years later. Six months after completing the buyout of Chrysalis, Thorn EMI bought Virgin Records from Richard Branson in one of its highest-profile and most expensive acquisitions in record music history. In 1992, Thorn EMI entered the Christian music market by acquiring Sparrow Records.

=== Aftermath of demerger from Thorn ===
Due to the increasing divergence of business models, Thorn EMI shareholders voted in favour of demerger proposals on 16 August 1996. The resulting media company was now known as EMI Group PLC. In 1997, EMI Records USA was folded into both Virgin and Capitol.

Since the 1930s, the Pathé Records label headquartered in Shanghai, China had been published under the EMI banner and since then, EMI had also been the dominant label in the cantopop market throughout Greater China until the genre's decline in the mid-1980s. Between the years 2004–2006, EMI then completely and totally divested itself from the c-pop market, and after that, all Hong Kong music artists previously associated with EMI had their music published by Gold Label, a concern unaffiliated with EMI and with which EMI did not yet hold any interest.

On 21 November 2000, Streamwaves and EMI signed a deal licensing EMI's catalogue in a digital format for their online streaming music service. This was the first time EMI had licensed any of its catalogue to a streaming music website.

Pop star Robbie Williams signed a six-album deal in 2002 paying him over £80 million ($157 million), which was not only the biggest recording contract in British music history at the time, but also the second biggest in music history behind that of Michael Jackson.

Apple Records, the record label representing the Beatles, launched a suit against EMI for non-payment of royalties on 15 December 2005. The suit alleged that EMI had withheld $50 million from the record label; however, an EMI spokesman noted that audits of record label accounts are not that unusual, confirming at least two hundred such audits performed on the label, but that these audits rarely result in legal action. A legal settlement was announced on 12 April 2007 and terms were undisclosed.

On 2 April 2007, EMI announced it would be releasing its music in DRM-free formats. These were to be issued in AAC format, which gave higher quality for the same bitrate compared with the ubiquitous MP3 format. The music would be distributed via Apple's iTunes Store (under the iTunes Plus category).

Tracks were to cost $1.29/€1.29/£0.99. Legacy tracks with FairPlay DRM would still be available for $0.99/€0.99/£0.79 – albeit with lower quality sound and DRM restrictions still in place. Users would be able to 'upgrade' the EMI tracks that they had already bought for $0.30/€0.30/£0.20. Albums were also to be available at the same price as their lower quality, DRM counterparts and music videos from EMI would also be DRM-free. The higher-quality, DRM-free files became available worldwide on iTunes on 30 May 2007, and were expected to appear on other music download services soon thereafter.

Following this decision, Universal Music Group also announced sales of DRM-free music (which was described as an experiment).

In May 2006, EMI attempted to buy Warner Music Group, which would have reduced the world's four largest record companies (Big Four) to three; however, the bid was rejected. Warner Music Group launched a Pac-Man defense, offering to buy EMI. EMI rejected the $4.6 billion offer.

=== Terra Firma takeover ===
After a decline in the British market share from 16% to 9%, and the announcement that it had sustained a loss of £260 million in 2006/2007, in August 2007 EMI was acquired by Terra Firma Capital Partners for £4.2 billion. Following the transition, several artists including Radiohead left EMI, while other artists such as Paul McCartney had left ahead of the takeover. At the same time, the Rolling Stones signed a one-album deal with Interscope Records/Universal Music Group outside its contract with EMI, which expired in February 2008, and then in July 2008 signed a new long-term deal with Universal Music Group. The Terra Firma takeover was also reported to have been the catalyst behind a lawsuit filed by Pink Floyd over unpaid royalties. In January 2011 Pink Floyd signed a new global agreement with EMI.

Around the same time, Guy Hands, CEO of Terra Firma Capital Partners, came to EMI with restructuring plans to cut between 1,500 and 2,000 jobs and to reduce costs by £200 million a year. As a result, the UK chief executive Tony Wadsworth left EMI after 25 years in January 2008. The cuts were planned to take effect over the year 2008, and would affect up to a third of EMI's 5,500 staff. Thirty Seconds to Mars tried to exit their contract with EMI following the layoff of its staff and due to unpaid royalties, prompting the label to file a lawsuit for $30 million citing breach of contract. The suit was later settled following a defence based on a contract case involving actress Olivia de Havilland decades before. Jared Leto explained, "The California Appeals Court ruled that no service contract in California is valid after seven years, and it became known as the De Havilland Law after she used it to get out of her contract with Warner Bros." Many industry watchers viewed the suit as a punitive harassment meant to scare other musicians. The band's troubles with the label resonate through their third studio album This Is War (2009) and were the subject of the 2012 documentary Artifact.

In 2008, EMI withdrew from the South-East Asian market entirely, forcing its large roster of acts to search out contracts with other unaffiliated labels. As a result, the South-East Asian market was the only region in the world where EMI was not in operation, although the record label continued to operate in Hong Kong and Indonesia (which was named Arka Music Indonesia). The Chinese and Taiwanese operation of EMI as well as the Hong Kong branch of Gold Label, was sold to Typhoon Group and reformed as Gold Typhoon. The Philippine branch of EMI changed its name to PolyEast Records, and was a joint venture between EMI itself and Pied Piper Records Corporation. The physical audio and video products of the label have been distributed in South-East Asia by Warner Music Group since December 2008 (Note: In September 2008, EMI withdrew from the Southeast Asian market, including Malaysia. Some Warner Music offices in Southeast Asia, including Malaysia and South Korea but excluding countries such as the Philippines and Taiwan, started an exclusive partnership with EMI Music. This partnership allowed them to manufacture, market, and distribute EMI releases within the region, including national repertoire. The partnership ended in August or September of 2013 when Universal Music Group acquired EMI. However, Warner Music acquired Parlophone and some other EMI assets, including select European companies, due to the European Commission's forced divestiture.), while new EMI releases in China and Taiwan, were distributed under Gold Typhoon which was previously known as EMI Music China and EMI Music Taiwan, respectively. Meanwhile, the Korean branch of EMI (known as EMI Korea Limited) had its physical releases distributed by Warner Music Korea. EMI Music Japan, the Japanese EMI branch, remains unchanged from the reflection of Toshiba's divestiture to the business by EMI buying the whole branch way back July 2007, making it a full subsidiary.

In July 2009, there were reports that EMI would not sell CDs to independent album retailers in a bid to cut costs, but in fact only a handful of small physical retailers were affected.

=== Citigroup ownership ===
In February 2010, EMI Group reported pre-tax losses of £1.75 billion for the year ended March 2009, including write-downs on the value of its music catalogue. In addition, KPMG issued a going concern warning on the holding company's accounts regarding an ability to remain solvent.

Citigroup (which held $4 billion in debt) took 100% ownership of EMI Group from Terra Firma Capital Partners on 1 February 2011, writing off £2.2 billion of debt and reducing EMI's debt load by 65%. The group was put up for sale and final bids were due by 5 October 2011.

=== Sony/Universal/Warner sale ===
On 12 November 2011, it was announced that EMI would sell its recorded music operations to Universal Music Group (UMG) for £1.2 billion ($1.9 billion) and its music publishing operations to Sony/ATV Music Publishing-for $2.2 billion. Among the other companies that had competed for the recorded music business was Warner Music Group which was reported to have made a $2 billion bid. However, IMPALA has said that it would fight the merger. In March 2012, the European Union opened an investigation into Universal's purchase of EMI's recorded music division and had asked rivals and consumer groups whether the deal will result in higher prices and shut out competitors.

On 21 September 2012, the sale of EMI to UMG was approved in both Europe and the United States by the European Commission and the Federal Trade Commission respectively. The European Commission approved the deal, however, under the condition that the merged company divest itself of one third of its total operations to other companies with a proven track record in the music industry. To comply with this condition, UMG divested V2 Records, Parlophone Records, Sanctuary Records, Chrysalis Records, Mute Records, EMI Classics, Virgin Classics, the 2CD Originals Series and EMI's regional labels in most of Europe. These labels were operated separately under the name "Parlophone Label Group", pending their sale. Universal would, however, retain its ownership of the Beatles' library (moved to the newly formed Calderstone Productions) and Robbie Williams' Chrysalis recordings (moved to the Island Records label).

Universal Music Group completed its acquisition of EMI on 28 September 2012, followed by worldwide compliance and complete rebranding by 1 April 2013. In compliance with the conditions of the European Commission, on 22 December, Universal Music Group sold the Mute catalogue, previously property of EMI, to German-based music rights company BMG. On 8 February 2013, Warner Music Group signed an agreement to acquire Parlophone, Chrysalis Records, EMI Classics, Virgin Classics, the 2CD Originals Series and some of EMI's regional labels across Europe for US$765 million (£487 million). Regulatory approval was received on 15 May. Universal retained EMI's former European labels in Ireland, Italy, the Netherlands, Germany, Switzerland, Austria, Hungary, and Finland.

Universal Music has continued to operate EMI entities it retained using the EMI name and formed Virgin EMI Records as a UMG label unit in the UK. The former EMI Records Ltd. was renamed Parlophone Records Ltd. in 2013, when Warner Music Group acquired Parlophone Music Group which has the rights to the old EMI Records catalogue.

The Australian and New Zealand EMI Columbia catalogues, including recordings by John Farnham, who went by Johnny during his time with the label, were ceded to Universal Music Australia's imprint EMI Recorded Music and Universal Music New Zealand respectively.

Warner Music incorporated EMI Classics and Virgin Classics into its Warner Classics unit with the EMI Classics artist roster and catalogue absorbed into the Warner Classics label and the Virgin Classics artist roster and catalogue absorbed into the revived Erato Records label.

On 14 November 2013, EMI's Middle Eastern branch was folded into Universal Music, causing the distribution of Warner Music Group's releases in that region to be moved to Universal Music.

On 30 June 2014, Universal Music Group re-established EMI's Taiwanese division, with A-Mei, Rainie Yang and Show Lo signing first to the label.

In May 2016, an independent company, Blue Raincoat Music, bought most of Chrysalis's British catalogue from Warner Music, making Chrysalis an independent label again. However, the remainder of Chrysalis's British catalogue, namely other past artists Spandau Ballet, Jethro Tull, the Ramones and The Proclaimers, stayed with Parlophone in the UK and (excluding Ramones) Rhino Entertainment in the United States. The Ramones American back catalogue remained with Island's sister label Geffen Records, the successor of MCA Records, which previously distributed the band's releases on Radioactive Records, and is licensed to Universal Music Enterprises. Additionally, the majority of Chrysalis's American catalogue also remained with Capitol Music Group, parent of Island's and Geffen's sister label Capitol Records, and is currently distributed by that label. Debbie Harry's only Chrysalis album with an American release, KooKoo, was later divested by Capitol. The European Chrysalis catalogue, including Harry's four albums, plus the rights to ten artists not originally signed to the label are owned and distributed by Blue Raincoat.

The number of initial non-Chrysalis artists was later increased to 11 after adding former EMI artists Naked Eyes. Belinda Carlisle's only Chrysalis album, A Woman & a Man, had its distribution and rights outside the US reverted to CMG's Virgin Records, Carlisle's former label which was the second in her career.

Also in May 2016, the history of the record label was examined in the hour-long BBC documentary EMI: The Inside Story.

On 16 June 2020, Universal rebranded Virgin EMI as EMI Records, reopening the iconic label, and named Rebecca Allen, former president of Decca Records, as the new EMI's president. UMG has continued to operate Virgin as an imprint of EMI.

== Operations ==
=== Entertainment and leisure ===
In 1964, EMI acquired Blackpool Tower from the Bickerstaffe family. In 1967, it also took over the Winter Gardens complex in Blackpool.

In 1967, EMI acquired the Grade Organisation, the UK's largest showbusiness talent agency, for £7.5 million. This also included the recently acquired Shipman and King chain of 32 cinemas in the Home Counties.

==== Film, theatre and television ====
EMI Films was created in 1969 following the acquisition of Associated British Picture Corporation (ABPC). At the time ABPC owned 270 ABC Cinemas; a half share (under the Associated British Corporation name) in the ITV contractor Thames Television; Elstree Studios at Shenley Road, and had recently bought Anglo-Amalgamated, a film studio. Bernard Delfont of the Grade Organisation became chairman and Chief Executive. In 1970, Delfont sold his own Bernard Delfont Organisation to EMI and the agencies were divested. He later became Chief Executive of EMI in 1979.

Their flagship cinema was the ABC 1 and 2 Shaftesbury Avenue which was built at the old Saville Theatre in London.

In 1974, the Film & Theatre Corporation was split into EMI Cinemas and EMI Leisure Enterprises. On formation, EMI Cinemas ran 272 cinemas in the UK, including those of ABC.

Following EMI's merger with Thorn Electrical Industries in 1979, EMI's film division was renamed Thorn EMI Screen Entertainment. In April 1986, Thorn EMI sold its film production and distribution arm (Thorn EMI Screen Entertainment), home video (Thorn EMI Video), and cinema (ABC Cinemas) operations to businessman Alan Bond. Bond, in turn, sold it to The Cannon Group a week later.

==== EMI Leisure ====
EMI Leisure Enterprises was formed in April 1974 and controlled Blackpool Tower; EMI's 16 squash clubs and five bowling alleys; discotheques; 23 licensed premises and other amusement interests. It began developing new leisure businesses, including Brighton Marina and golf activities with the opening of Aldenham Golf Club. In April 1977 it acquired the Empire Ballroom and Cinema in Leicester Square in London and in September 1977 acquired Bailey Leisure Services Limited which it renamed EMI Dancing which provided the group with dance halls, cabaret clubs and discotheques around the UK. By the late 1970s, the leisure business contributed 15% of group revenues. In 1978, EMI acquired the Prince Edward Theatre. It also owned two other theatres in London as well as theatres in the rest of the UK.

Following the merger with Thorn, part of EMI's leisure interests were sold to Trust House Forte in November 1980 for £16 million. Lord Delfont became chairman and chief executive of THF's leisure division. EMI Social Centres chain of bingo halls remained with Thorn EMI.

The Winter Gardens in Blackpool were sold in 1983 to First Leisure.

==== Hotels and restaurants ====
In 1972, EMI Hotels won a bidding war against Ralston Purina to buy the Golden Egg group from the Kaye brothers for £14 million, which included a stake in Angus Steakhouse restaurants and the Selfridge Hotel, which opened in July 1973.

In June 1977, EMI acquired the Tower Hotel, London. At the end of 1978, they owned four other hotels: Royal Horseguards Hotel; Royal Angus; Royal Trafalgar; and Royal Westminster.

As well as Angus Steakhouse, their restaurants also included Wimpy Bars, Picnic Basket and Tennessee Pancake Houses.

Following the merger with Thorn, seven hotels and 12 Angus Steakhouse restaurants were sold in July 1980 for £23 million to Scottish & Newcastle Breweries.

=== EMI Music Publishing ===
As well as the well-known record label the group also owned EMI Music Publishing, which was the largest music publisher in the world. EMI Music Publishing has won the Music Week Award for Publisher of the Year every year for over 10 years; in 2009, for the first time in history the award was shared jointly with Universal Music Publishing. The publishing arm and record label are separate businesses.

EMI administered the publishing rights of over 1.3 million songs, headlined by Queen, Carole King, The Police, the Motown catalog, Kanye West, Alicia Keys, Drake, Sia, P!nk, Pharrell Williams, and Calvin Harris.

EMI's music publishing operations were sold to a consortium led by Sony/ATV Music Publishing in 2012; BMG acquired the music publishing libraries of Virgin Music (which EMI held) and Famous Music UK (which Sony/ATV held).

== Criticism ==
=== CD price fixing ===
Between 1995 and 2000, music companies were found to have used illegal marketing agreements such as minimum advertised pricing to artificially inflate prices of compact discs in order to end price wars by discounters such as Best Buy and Target in the early 1990s.

In 2002, a settlement found that the publishing and distribution companies Sony Music, Warner Music, Bertelsmann Music Group, EMI and Universal Music, would pay a $67.4 million fine and distribute $75.7 million in CDs to public and non-profit groups in restitution for price fixing. None of the companies admitted wrongdoing. It was estimated customers were overcharged by nearly $500 million and up to $5 per album.

On Internet Freedom Day in January 2013, EMI evoked controversy after the removal of Martin Luther King Jr's "I Have a Dream" speech from Vimeo due to a copyright violation.

== See also ==
- Pathé Records (Baak Doi)
- EMI Archive Trust
- EMI Christian Music Group (EMI CMG)
- EMI Films
- EMI Songbook Series
- EMI Televisa Music/Capitol Latin
- Jim Fifield
- HMV Group
  - Waterstone's
- Picture Music International
- List of EMI artists
- List of EMI labels
- Lists of record labels
