= Jawbone (company) =

Defunct technology company

AliphCom, Inc.
- Trade name: Jawbone (2008)
- Industry: consumer electronics industry
- Founded: 1999
- Founder: Alexander Asseily; Hosain Rahman
- Defunct: July 2017
- Fate: Liquidated
- Headquarters: San Francisco
- Key people: Yves Béhar

AliphCom, Inc. (doing business as Aliph, Jawbone) was an American technology company based in San Francisco. It made consumer products, including a fitness tracker, Bluetooth headphones, and wireless speakers.

The company was liquidated in July 2017 and co-founder Hosain Rahman moved to health products with Jawbone Health Hub.

== History ==
AliphCom was founded by Alexander Asseily and Hosain Rahman in 1999.

With Lawrence Livermore Labs, Aliph researched noise suppression with grants from the United States Navy and DARPA in 2002. In 2004, Aliph released a noise-cancellation headset, which used military technology to erase background noise. The company's Bluetooth headset, the Jawbone, was released in 2006. Another headset was released in 2008 and 2009.

AliphCom changed its name to Jawbone in 2010.

Wireless speaker Jambox and Fitness tracker UP were introduced in 2011. Headset ERA was released in January 2014. The company stopped producing its fitness trackers and soon sold all its remaining inventory. The company was liquidated in July 2017. Jawbone's fitness tracker was removed from shops in 2018.

Aliph Brands holds the license to Jawbone products and others.

== Legal proceedings ==
Jawbone patents were used to sue technology companies like Samsung in 2021.
