= Kevin Bermeister =

Australian businesspeople (born 1960)

- Born: 1960 (age 65–66); South Africa
- Occupation: entrepreneur
- Known for: Ozisoft (founder); Brilliant Digital Entertainment Inc. (founder & CEO)
- Awards: Yeshiva Center Leadership in Philanthropy

Kevin Bermeister (born 1960 in South Africa) is an Australian entrepreneur with businesses in the computer, multimedia and Internet industries.

Bermeister is a technology innovator, real estate investor, philanthropist, and the founder, chairman and CEO of Brilliant Digital Entertainment Inc. (BDE). Bermeister was a founding investor in Skype.

== Career ==
In 1983, Bermeister established Ozisoft, one of the first interactive multimedia companies. By 1990, Ozisoft was Australia's largest video games distributor. In 1992, Bermeister and Mark Dyne led a management buyout together with Sega Enterprises to form Sega Ozisoft Pty Limited representing exclusively the world's largest video game publisher.

In 1994, Bermeister and his property consortium Jacfun negotiated rights to property at Sydney's Darling Harbour and established the interactive Sega World Sydney amusement park, operated through a joint venture including shareholders Sega Enterprises Japan, Mitsubishi Corp. and Mitsui Corp.

Bermeister founded Brilliant Digital Entertainment Inc. in 1996, focusing on 3D graphics streaming and compression for which it was granted 8 patents. BDE was the founding member of the Distributed Industry Computing Association. The company developed a number of Internet interests including Altnet, a joint venture with Joltid Ltd., to develop and market secure distributed storage for content using P2P technology to reduce distribution costs and reach new audiences. In 2003 Altnet, using its distributed storage technology, became the largest provider of secure DRM content, having distributed 75 million licensed files to users of various P2P file sharing software applications. Another initiative undertaken by Altnet under Bermeister's stewardship is Global File Registry, which enables governments and copyright owners to police the distribution of illegal or infringing material over distributed systems and the Internet.

In 2006, Altnet and Kazaa reached a settlement with leading music and motion picture industry plaintiffs. Since then, Bermeister has focused on building and acquiring content, technology and distribution assets for BDE.

In 2006, BDE was acquired by Kinetech Inc., a company with interests in patents and intellectual property licensing relating primarily to certain key distributed technologies that had been licensed by Altnet since 2002 and important to P2P storage and Global File Registry businesses of Altnet. Kinetech's patent and technology portfolio is often referred to as the True Name Patent Portfolio.

In 2008, BDE acquired the Kazaa Trademark and relaunched Kazaa with music licenses from major music labels Universal, Sony, Warner Music Group and EMI, major independent record labels, and leading music publishers.

In 2011, BDE subsidiary Kinetech acquired a majority interest in PersonalWeb LLC PersonalWeb, a Tyler, Texas-based technology company. PersonalWeb develops its software based in part on the 13 pending and issued patents in the Truenames Patent Portfolio.

=== Activity in Israel ===
Bermeister is an active investor in Israeli real estate. In 2011, he teamed with an Israeli retail magnate to bid for Nof Zion, a major residential project in East Jerusalem. In 2012, he acquired a stake in The Leonardo Inn at the entrance to the city. He is a founder of Jerusalem 5800, a long-term planning and research project for greater Jerusalem.

== Charity and sponsorship ==
Bermeister is a major benefactor and supporter of numerous charitable organisations including The Hunger Project, United Israel Appeal, Jewish Care, UniOne Foundation and Jake's Ladder, a foundation for research into cystic fibrosis, The City of David and Binyan Adei Ad. He was recently awarded the Yeshiva Center Leadership in Philanthropy Award.
