= StellaService =

American information and measurement company

- Type: Private
- Industry: Customer service
- Founded: 2009; 17 years ago New York City, New York, U.S.
- Founders: Jordan Leiser; John Ernsberger
- Headquarters: New York City, New York, U.S.
- Services: Stella Metrics; Stella Connect
- Website: stellaservice.com

StellaService Inc. is a privately held American information and measurement company with headquarters in New York City, New York. The company measures and rates the customer service performance of online companies in a process audited by global accounting and auditing firm KPMG. Founded in 2009, it produces both Stella Metrics (a mystery shopping platform) and Stella Connect (a customer feedback system).

== Company background ==
The company was founded in 2009 by Jordan Leiser and John Ernsberger, college roommates at Bucknell University, and incorporated in 2010. Leiser serves as StellaService's Chief Executive Officer and Ernsberger serves as the EVP of sales and service. In 2013 the company received $15 million from a series B round of financing led by Norwest Venture Partners. As of that year the company had raised a total of $22.2 million in financing from investors including Battery Ventures, Consigliere Brand Capital, DFJ Gotham Ventures, RRE Ventures. In 2015 StellaService raised an additional $15 million from Toba Capital and Novel TMT, in a series C round led by Comcast Ventures. The company is headquartered in New York City.

== Software ==
=== Stella Metrics ===
The company launched Stella Metrics in February 2013, a software as a service offering that syndicates the company's proprietary data to online retailers. The company focuses on measuring the customer service performance of retail and eCommerce companies. This is done through hiring a few hundred shoppers to make purchases or returns at companies in the US or UK, and then measuring the quality of delivery, refund speed, and response times via phone or email. Google also licenses StellaService data and utilizes it in the star rating system used on Google AdWords. In addition to this, Stella Metrics has also been integrated into the Google Merchant Profile system.

Each month the company "stress-tests" about three hundred metrics for client companies for approximately twenty thousand Internet transactions. Clients can either view this data about themselves or their competitors. The program has been referred to as a mystery shopping service. StellaService has used this data to release reports on trends on US and UK customer service as well, such as the results of increases in free shipping practices the use and effectiveness of social media as a customer service platform, shipping times and the amount of late packages during high volume shipping periods like holiday seasons, and call waiting times during periods of high call volume. They also publicly rate companies according to their findings.

=== Stella Connect ===
The company produced Stella Connect in 2015, which sends customers feedback request emails including personal information about the representative they were interacting with, including a photo and list of hobbies. The customer rates reps according to a five star system, and provides customers with the option of encouraging the company to provide the rep with small gifts in exchange for any high rated customer service, which can range from lunch to gift cards, or other items of the customer's choice. This feedback is sent directly to the customer rep that has been rated, and to a real-time dashboard where management can view employee performance on a rolling basis. The response rate of customers has been averaged at 40-50%.

== Clients and recognition ==
As of 2011 the websites displaying the StellaService Seal include Zappos.com, Diapers.com and 1-800-Flowers.com. Other clients include Walmart and Abercrombie & Fitch. In May 2013, the company announced a multi-year agreement with Google Inc. StellaService ratings and data are licensed by Google in multiple offerings, including the Google Trusted Stores program. In March 2013, the company received a grant of $250,000 from the New York City Economic Development Corporation to relocate and hire in Manhattan's Financial District as part of the Take the H.E.L.M. program.
