= Ösper =

River in Germany

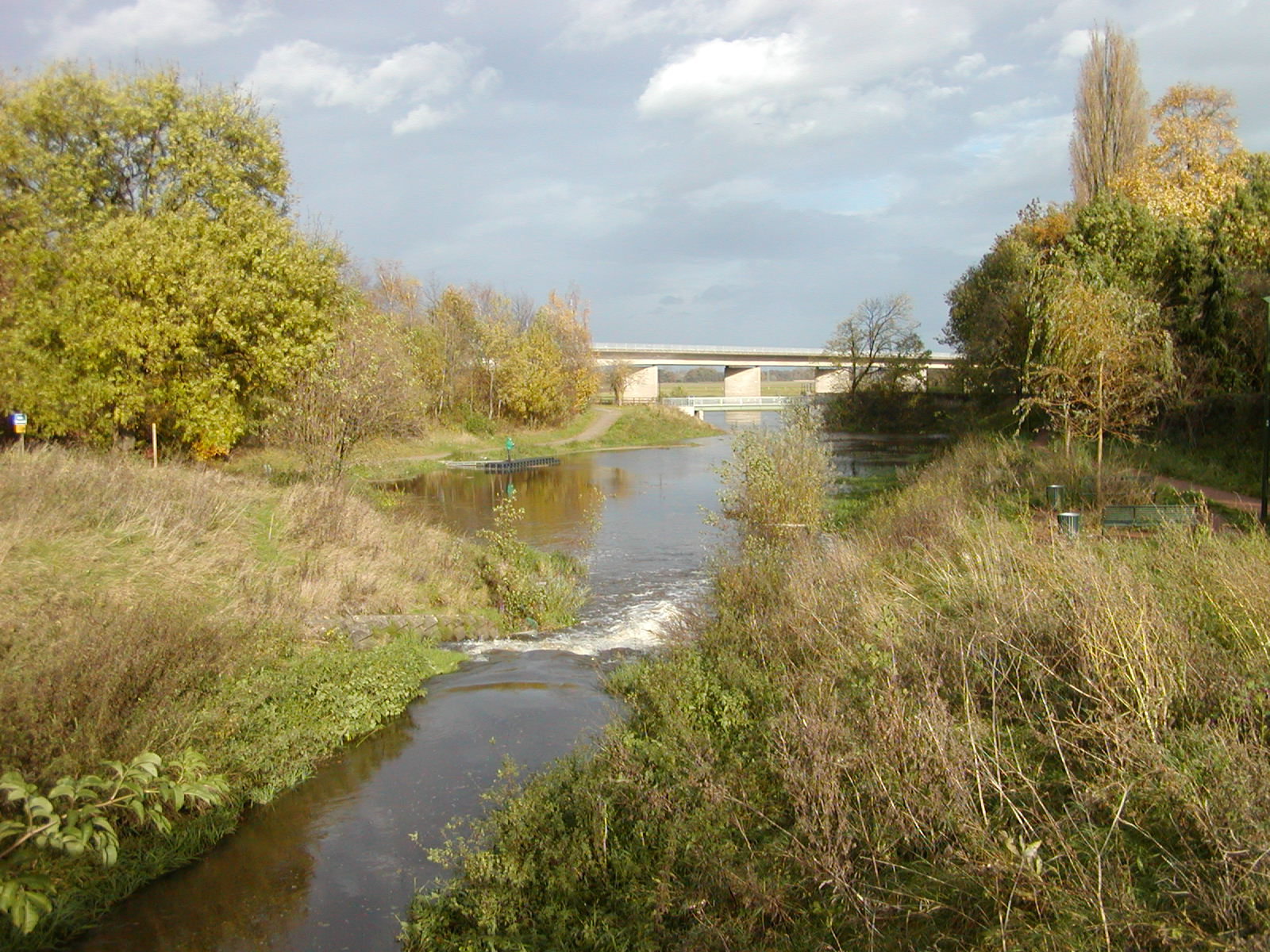

Location
- Country: Germany
- State: North Rhine-Westphalia

Physical characteristics
- Mouth
  - location: Weser
  - coordinates: 52.3805°N 8.9717°E
- Length: 14.5 km (9.0 mi)

Basin features
- Progression: Weser→ North Sea

Ösper is a river of North Rhine-Westphalia, Germany. It flows into the Weser in Petershagen.

== See also ==
- List of rivers of North Rhine-Westphalia
