= Streamwaves =

Former online music service

- Launched: 1999
- Platforms: Windows, Mac OS X, Linux, TiVo, Nokia Internet Tablets
- Pricing model: monthly subscription unlimited
- Availability: United States, United Kingdom, Germany
- Website: http://www.streamwaves.com

Streamwaves was an online music service founded by Jeff Tribble and Daniel Hexter in Dallas, Texas. Founded during file sharing service Napster's legal troubles, Streamwaves was the first company to license major label masters for a subscription service, and the first company to launch a subscription service with major label content in 2002. In 2005 Streamwaves became part of the Rhapsody music service owned by RealNetworks.

== History ==
Streamwaves Inc. was founded in 1999, when Jeff Tribble and Daniel Hexter began work on a legal alternative to illegal file sharing services such as Napster and Kazaa. The final product was a web-based streaming service that did not require users to download any software to play music or save playlists. In November 2000, EMI became the first major label to license a portion of its music catalog to Streamwaves. The two companies launched a separate music service, HigherWaves, on August 13, 2001, offering 10,000 Christian songs by more than 350 musicians. It was the first label-supported music subscription service.

The next major label was Universal Music Group, which signed a licensing agreement with Streamwaves in June 2002. Three months later, Warner Music Group became the third major label to license content to Streamwaves, which now offered over 150,000 digital songs and albums in its collection. Subsequent deals with other labels, including Sony Music Entertainment, Harry Fox Agency, BMI and others brought the size of Streamwaves' library to over 450,000 songs and albums. In 2005, the Streamwaves service was merged with the Rhapsody music service.

== Compatibility ==
Being a browser-based service, Streamwaves did not have most of the compatibility problems other services encountered. The Streamwaves jukebox worked on Windows and Macintosh computers alike. The company lured Macintosh users and members of Mac user communities through discounts on the monthly subscription fee.

== Marketing ==
Streamwaves marketed its service online and through traditional brick and mortar stores such as FYE and CompUSA stores, among others. Hewlett-Packard offered 30-day trials to users of its myhpclub.com and mypresarioclub.com websites. In 2003, Streamwaves took to the task of converting Kazaa users to paying, legal customers. Partnering with Altnet, Streamwaves offered searchers on KaZaA free 30-second samples of songs for which they were searching and directed them to sign up for the full-featured service. Also in 2003, Streamwaves partnered with Excite to provide a co-branded online streaming music store to Excite customers. CD3 Storage Systems, Inc. partnered with Streamwaves to offer free music on all of its Discgear products for the 2004 holiday season.

== See also ==
- iTunes – Apple's media library and media player software
- Zune – Microsoft's former digital media brand
