= Telio =

Norwegian telecommunications company

Telio AS
- Company type: Aksjeselskap
- Industry: Telecommunications
- Founded: 2003
- Headquarters: Oslo, Norway
- Area served: Norway; Denmark; Netherlands; Switzerland
- Key people: Eirik Lunde (CEO); Erik Osmundsen (Chairman); Alan Duric (CTO, Co-founder)
- Services: VoIP
- Number of employees: 100 (2007)
- Parent: NextGenTel Holding
- Website: www.telio.no

Telio (stylized as Tel.io) is a Norwegian telecommunications company that provides VoIP telephony services in Norway, Denmark and the Netherlands with a total of 200,000 customers, making it the second largest VoIP service provider in Norway, after Telenor. It is also a virtual supplier of GSM mobile subscriptions.

== History ==
Founded in 2003, it was the first company to offer VoIP in Norway when it launched the service in 2004. At the time, its competitive advantage was that it offered a fixed price without any minute fees; include free calls to Western Europe, the United States and Canada. The company was placed on the Oslo Stock Exchange in 2006. The company has announced that it will target small and medium sized businesses. In 2007 it launched a cooperation with Tandberg to create a new platform for video based VoIP.

On 20 December 2012, Telio bought NextGenTel. NextGenTel, being the 2nd largest xDSL provider in Norway, allowed Telio to deliver VoIP, Mobile, Internet & IP TV from their own platform. Telio's own free smartphone app Goji which was revealed on 27 April 2011 has gained a lot of users, especially in the Middle East and in USA/Canada.
