= Rdio =

Music streaming service

- Key people: Anthony Bay (CEO); Carter Adamson (Co-founder); Niklas Zennström, Janus Friis (Founders)
- Launched: August 3, 2010
- Discontinued: December 22, 2015
- Platforms: Web, iOS, Android, BlackBerry, Windows Phone, OS X, Windows, Roku OS

Rdio (pronounced "r-dee-oh") was an online music streaming service that offered ad-supported free streaming and ad-free subscription streaming services in 85 countries.

Rdio's library had content from the four major record labels, as well as the Merlin Network and the aggregators BFM Digital, Catapult, CD Baby, boomertunes, INgrooves, and The Orchard. Rdio also offered social networking features, such as the ability to share songs, albums, and playlists with others on Rdio and social networks such as Facebook and Twitter.

On November 16, 2015, Rdio filed for Chapter 11 bankruptcy in which they had to pay $200 million and announced the sale of certain intellectual property to Pandora Radio. The purchase price was $75 million in cash.

== History ==
Rdio was available in over 60 countries.

Rdio was launched by Skype Technologies founders Niklas Zennström and Janus Friis on August 3, 2010. On January 16, 2014 Rdio introduced some free streaming options, supported by audio advertisements.

On November 16, 2015, Rdio filed for Chapter 11 bankruptcy, and reached a deal to sell certain assets and intellectual property to a competitor, Pandora, for $75 million, pending approval by the bankruptcy court. As part of this transition, the Rdio service was discontinued effective December 22, 2015, and some employees were transferred to Pandora, which planned to introduce an "expanded" experience incorporating this IP in late 2016.

== Platforms ==
It was available as a website and via app for Android, BlackBerry, iOS, and Windows Phone mobile devices, which could stream music from Rdio's servers or download music for offline playback; there were also clients for the Roku OS and Sonos systems. The web-based service also offered a native desktop client application for OS X and Windows, as well as a Windows Store application.

== Vdio ==
On April 2, 2013 Rdio launched Vdio, a movie and television show streaming service. Vdio was set up similarly to Rdio but adopted a pay-per-view model. The service focused on newly released titles from major Hollywood studios like Disney, Fox, Universal Studios, and Warner Bros.

Current Rdio subscribers were given US$25 in credit to spend on Vdio.

Vdio was shut down on December 27, 2013.

== Critical reception ==
In 2013, Entertainment Weekly compared a number of music services and judged Rdio the best, grading it "A" and writing that it had "by far the best app and online interface, making database searching and playlist curation easy".

== Partnerships ==
Oi - On November 1, 2011, Rdio entered the Brazilian market by announcing a partnership with Oi, Brazil's largest telecommunications company, under the brand name Oi Rdio.

Cumulus Media - On September 16, 2013, Cumulus Media announced a deal with Rdio that gave the second largest owner and operator of AM and FM radio stations in the United States an online outlet. This partnership gave Rdio broad access to its programming and promoted Rdio on Cumulus stations.

Tesla Motors - On February 6, 2014, Tesla Motors’ CEO Elon Musk announced Rdio would be integrated into its cars in Europe as the default dashboard audio service.

Google Chromecast - On March 31, 2014, Google announced a deal that made Rdio available on Chromecast in 12 countries.

Jaguar Land Rover - In January 2015, Rdio announced a partnership with Jaguar Land Rover. The application went live on Jaguar LandRover's InControlApps Platform on July 3, 2015.

HEOS by Denon - In July 2015, HEOS by Denon announced its new partnership with Rdio.

Roku - Rdio is a special app button on the 'Roku 3' remote control, along with Netflix, Amazon, and Hulu.

== Acquisitions ==
On March 14, 2014, Rdio acquired Indian Music streaming service Dhingana, to push global expansion.

On June 30, 2014, Rdio acquired the social music discovery service TastemakerX. The entire TastemakerX team joined Rdio with TastemakerX CEO Marc Ruxin becoming the new COO.

On November 16, 2015, it was announced that Pandora Radio would acquire Rdio for $75 million in cash. Rdio ceased streaming music on December 22 the same year.

== API ==
Launched in 2011, Rdio's API allowed developers to add music to a web or mobile application with the ability to search, access, and play all of the artists, songs, albums, playlists, and charts in Rdio's catalog.
