= Janus Friis =

Danish entrepreneur (born 1976)

- Born: 26 June 1976 (age 50); Copenhagen, Denmark
- Occupation: Entrepreneur
- Known for: Co-founder of Skype, KaZaA, and Rdio

Janus Friis (Danish: [ˈjɛːnus ˈfʁiˀs]; born 26 June 1976) is a Danish entrepreneur best known for co-founding the file-sharing application Kazaa, and the peer-to-peer telephony application Skype. In September 2005, he and his business partner Niklas Zennström sold Skype to eBay for US$2.6 billion. Friis has maintained ownership interest in Skype through Silver Lake Partners, which sold Skype to Microsoft for $8.5 billion (~$11.7 billion in 2024), in May 2011.

Friis and Zennström also developed Joost—an interactive software application for distributing TV shows and other forms of video content over the Web. The assets of this service were sold to Adconion Media Group in November 2009. Independently, Friis founded video streaming startup Vdio in 2011.

Friis and Ahti Heinla founded Starship Technologies in 2014, to develop small self-driving delivery robots.

== Career ==
Friis had no formal higher education, dropping out of high school before starting a job at the help desk of CyberCity, one of Denmark's first Internet service providers. He met Zennström in 1996. At that time, Zennström headed Tele2 in Denmark, and Friis was hired to run its customer support. Friis and Zennström worked together at Tele2 to launch get2net, another Danish ISP, and the portal everyday.com.

After this, the partners decided to leave Tele2. Friis moved into Zennström's small apartment in Amsterdam in January 2000 where they started developing KaZaA, the company responsible for the most popular software for use with the FastTrack file sharing network protocol. Janus Friis and Niklas Zennström developed the FastTrack protocol in 2001.

From the success of KaZaA's peer-to-peer technology the duo co-founded Joltid, a software company developing and marketing peer-to-peer solutions and peer-to-peer traffic optimization technologies to companies.

Friis is also co-founder of Altnet, a network that sells commercial music to KaZaA users.

Friis founded the online music streaming service Rdio with Zennström in 2010. It filed for bankruptcy in November 2015 and announced the sale of assets to Pandora Radio for $75 million (~$96.7 million in 2024).

In 2012, Friis co-founded Wire, a secure collaboration platform that uses end-to-end encryption to protect digital assets.

Friis and Ahti Heinla founded Starship Technologies in 2014, to develop small self-driving delivery robots. In September 2016, the robots took the streets in San Francisco in a test authorized by the city.

== Awards ==
Friis was named in Time Magazine's list of 100 most influential people in 2006.

In 2006 Friis got the award “IT-prisen” ("The IT Prize") in his home country, given by the Danish IT industry and IDG, for his work and innovation.

He and Zennström were also the co-recipients of the 2006 Wharton Infosys Business Transformation Award, given to business and individuals who have used information technology in a way that changed an industry or society as a whole.

== Personal life ==
He was engaged to Danish recording artist Aura Dione but the couple split up in April 2015.
