= Joost =

2007–2012 Internet TV service

- Screenshot The Joost homepage in May 2009
- Developer: Joost N.V.
- Final release: none (n/a) [±] K.K.
- Preview release: 1.1.7 / 18 June 2008; 18 years ago
- Operating system: Windows XP, Vista; Mac OS X (x86 only), iOS, PlayStation 3
- Available in: English
- Type: P2PTV
- License: Freeware
- Website: www.joost.com

Joost (/ˈdʒuːst/) was an Internet TV service, created by Niklas Zennström and Janus Friis (founders of Skype and Kazaa). During 2007–2008 Joost used peer-to-peer TV (P2PTV) technology to distribute content to their Mozilla-based desktop player; in late 2008 this was migrated to use a Flash-based Web player instead.

Joost began development in 2006. Working under the code name "The Venice Project", Zennström and Friis assembled teams of some 150 software developers in about six cities around the world, including New York City, London, Leiden and Toulouse. According to Zennström at a 25 July 2007 press conference about Skype held in Tallinn, Estonia, Joost had signed up more than a million beta testers, and its launch was scheduled for the end of 2007.

The team signed up with Warner Music, Indianapolis Motor Speedway Productions (Indianapolis 500, IndyCar Series) and production company Endemol for the beta. In February 2007, Viacom entered into a deal with the company to distribute content from its media properties, including MTV Networks, Black Entertainment Television (BET) and film studio Paramount Pictures.

The company went through restructuring several times and sold most of its assets in 2009; it suspended operations in 2012.

== Technology ==
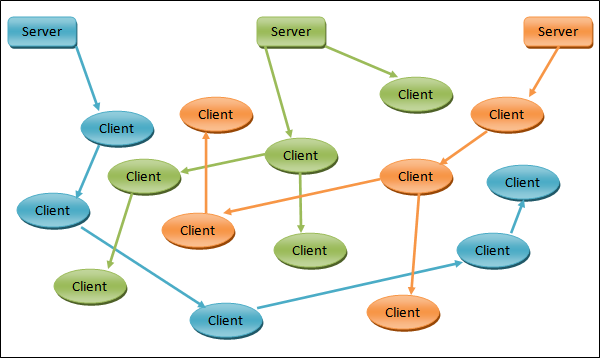
P2PTV overlay network serving three video streams.

The program was based on P2PTV technology and was expected to deliver (relaying) near-TV resolution images. It turned a PC into an instant on-demand TV with no need for an additional set-up box. News updates, discussion forums, show ratings, and multi-user chat sessions (often linked to the active stream/channel) were made possible through the use of semi-transparent widget overlays.

The initial version of the software was based on XULRunner and the audio management re-used the ZAP Media Kit. The peer to peer layer for on-demand video came from the Joltid company, which also provided the peer to peer layer of Skype. A peer to peer layer for live video was developed from scratch, with a first trial run broadcasting March Madness 2008. The video playback used the CoreCodec, CoreAVC H.264 video decoder.

Joost soft launched its Widget API on 29 August 2007 under a non-copyleft open source license and encouraged third-party developers to create tools for its TV 2.0 platform.

In 2009 Joost released a special website for the PlayStation 3 Internet browser that took advantage of some of the browser's full screen and 'x' button capabilities. By holding the 'x' button, you could choose various video options using the d-pad.

As opposed to streaming technology in which all clients get the feed from the server, P2P TV technology differs in the sense that the servers serve only a handful of clients; each of the clients in turn propagate the stream to more downstream clients and so on. This moves the distribution costs from the channel owner to the user.

== Financing ==
As co-owners of Skype, Friis and Zennström received part of a $2.6 billion cash payment when eBay acquired Skype in 2005, which easily covered the development and marketing cost of their Joost venture. Just a week after launching the service, the founders announced that they had raised an additional $45 million. Sequoia Capital, which backed Yahoo, Google and YouTube; Index Ventures, an early investor in Skype; Li Ka-shing, the Hong Kong tycoon; and CBS, the US media group, had all taken "small minority" stakes in the start-up. Viacom was also understood to be among the partners, although the nature of its backing had not been disclosed.

The Joost service was ad-supported, with advertising analogous to that shown on traditional TV, according to former CEO Fredrik de Wahl. Joost had 40 advertisers, including Sony Pictures, BMW, and Sprite. Aside from injected video-advertisements, it served additional interactive advertisements via overlays and short pop-ups that were clickable.

== History ==
Viacom, Inc., and Joost entered into a content provider agreement for the Joost platform on 20 February 2007. Under the agreement, divisions of Viacom (including MTV Networks, BET Networks and Paramount Pictures) were to license their "television and theatrical programming" to Joost. This came shortly after Viacom requested 100,000 potentially infringing videos to be removed from YouTube.com, which showed a preference by Viacom for the Joost platform over YouTube.

As of 2007, Joost had licensing agreements in place with Ministry of Sound TV, Aardman Animation, Warner Music, the production company Endemol, Fremantle Media, RDF Media, Diversion Media, CBS and CenterStaging's rehearsals.com. On 1 May 2007, Joost signed a deal to distribute NHL content, including full game replays of the Stanley Cup Finals, and vintage games. Bollywood distributor Eros International also announced a deal with Joost in 2007. The majority of the content on Joost was restricted to users in the United States of America, due to lack of international licensing arrangements.

The company's first CEO, Frederick de Wahl, was succeeded by Mike Volpi in June 2007. Volpi stepped down in July 2009 amidst a round of job cuts, being succeeded by Matt Zelesko. Volpi blamed the content companies for sidelining Joost.

On 17 December 2008, Joost emailed its customers explaining that the project was moving to a website-only model, and that the Joost application would stop working Friday, 19 December.

Joost's UK subsidiary was liquidated in 2009. On 24 November 2009, Adconion Media Group announced that they would be purchasing the company's assets for an undisclosed amount. Both companies have Index Ventures as a major investor.

On 30 April 2012 the joost.com website announced, without further explanation: "We are re-evaluating the Joost.com purpose and services. For the near-term, we have decided to suspend the site to allow for a full re-evaluation." In May 2012, Adconion rebranded and folded Joost Media into smartclip, another company they had previously acquired. Zennstrom has written a post-mortem analysis of the company, in the 2016 book When Founders Fail.

== See also ==
- Internet Television
- IPTV
