= Niklas Zennström =

Swedish entrepreneur (born 1966)

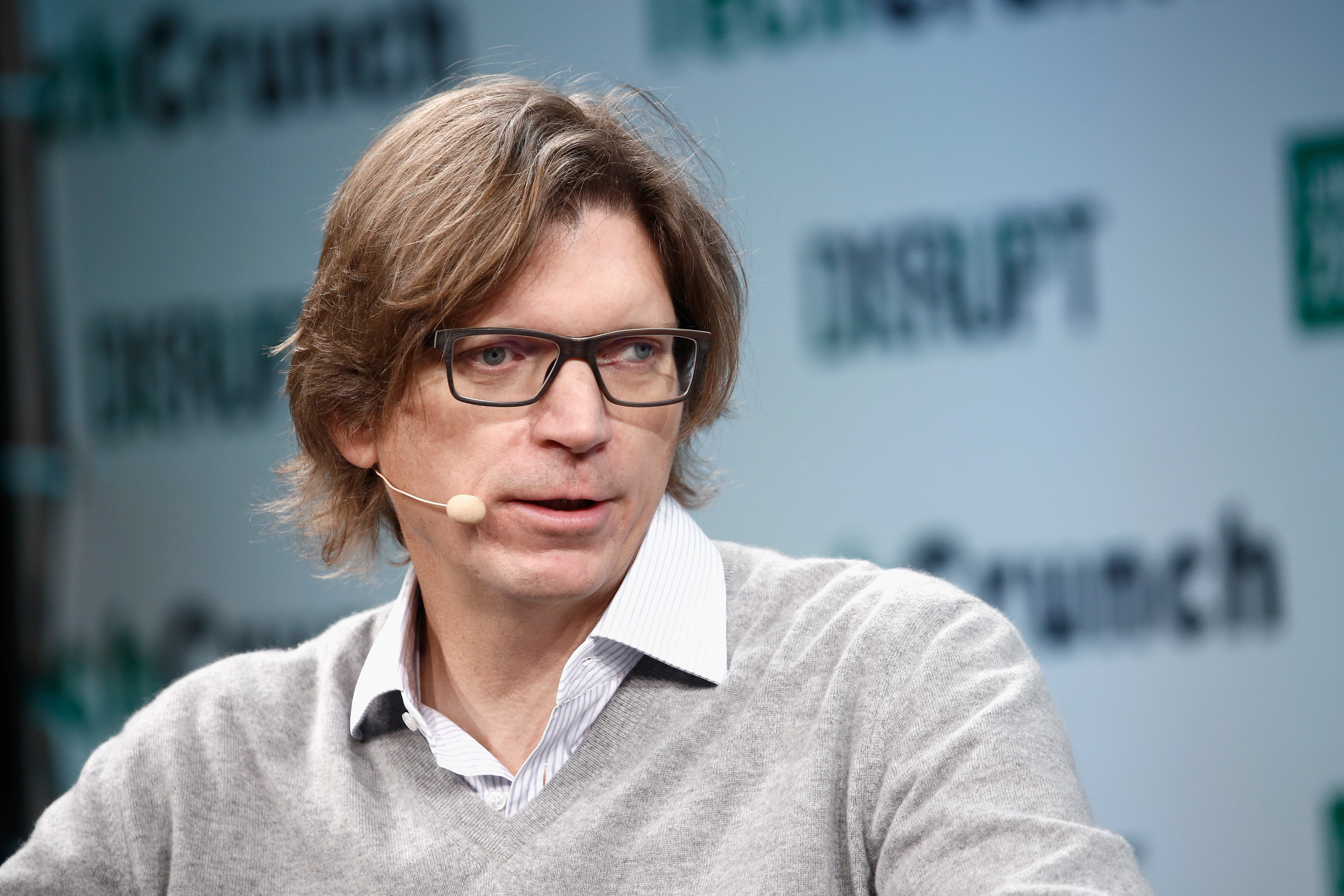
- Zennström in 2016
- Born: 16 February 1966 (age 60); Järfälla, Sweden
- Education: Uppsala University (BSc, MSc)
- Occupations: Entrepreneur and investor
- Years active: 1991–present
- Known for: Co-founding Kazaa, Skype and Atomico
- Title: CEO of Atomico
- Spouse: Catherine Zennström
- Awards: Time 100 (2006); KTH Great Prize (2009); H. M. The King's Medal (2013)

Niklas Zennström (Swedish: [ˈnɪ̌kːlas ˈsɛ̂nːstrœm]; born 16 February 1966) is a Swedish entrepreneur, technology investor, and philanthropist. He is the founder and chief executive officer (CEO) of a European venture capital firm Atomico based in London. Previously, he co-founded the file-sharing service KaZaA and the internet telephony provider Skype with Janus Friis, where he was the CEO until March 2008.

== Early life and education ==
Zennström was born in 1966 in Järfälla, Stockholm County, Sweden, and grew up in Uppsala. He attended Uppsala University, where he earned a bachelor’s degree in business administration and a master's degree in engineering physics. He spent one year as an exchange student at the University of Michigan in Ann Arbor.

Zennström developed an early interest in computing following the release of the Apple Macintosh, which prompted him to enroll in a computer course.

== Career ==
Zennström began his career in 1991 at the telecommunications company Tele2, where he worked under Jan Stenbeck. In 1997, he hired Janus Friis to head customer service of Tele2’s Danish subsidiary. In 1999, he resigned from Tele2 at the peak of the dot-com bubble to co-found Get2Net and Everyday.com with Friis.

In 2001, Zennström and Friis co-founded the peer-to-peer file-sharing application KaZaA which was released in 2003 and became the most downloaded software at that time. It was sold to Sharman Networks in 2002. During this period, Zennström also founded and was CEO of Joltid, a software company that developed traffic optimization technologies, and co-founded the peer-to-peer network Altnet.

In 2003, Zennström and Friis launched Skype, a Voice over Internet Protocol (VoIP) service. In September 2005, eBay acquired Skype for approximately €2.1 billion ($2.6 billion). Zennström was Skype's CEO until 2008. In 2009, he was part of an investor group that repurchased a majority stake in Skype, which was subsequently sold to Microsoft in 2011 for $8.5 billion.

In 2006, he co-founded the internet video service Joost, which was sold in 2009. In 2010, he and Friis launched the music streaming service Rdio which was acquired by Pandora in 2015.

Zennström is also the founder of European venture capital firm Atomico headquartered in London. The firm has invested in technology companies including Supercell, Klarna, Skype, and DeepL. Atomico’s most recent Fund VI raised $1.24 billion.

In August 2026, Zennström joined the board of directors of PsiQuantum, a quantum computing company in which Atomico had invested since 2019. He has been on the board of directors for H&M and the medical technology company Neko Health.

== Philanthropy ==
In 2007, Zennström and his wife, Catherine, established Zennström Philanthropies, a foundation that focuses on climate change and human rights initiatives. Zennström also founded Race for the Baltic, a non-profit organization focused on the environmental restoration of the Baltic Sea. In 2013, he funded a visiting professorship in climate change leadership at Uppsala University. He has been on the advisory board of the Stockholm Resilience Centre and is a member of the Human Rights Watch committee in Sweden.

== Personal life ==
Zennström is married to Catherine Zennström. He is an avid sailor and owns the racing yacht Rán. His team won the Rolex Fastnet Race in 2009 and 2011 and has also won world championships in the TP52 sailing class.

== Awards and recognition ==
- 2006: Named one of Time magazine's 100 most influential people. He also received the European Business Leaders Award for Entrepreneur of the Year, The Economist's Innovation Award, and Business Leader of the Year by European Voice in the same year.
- 2009: Awarded the KTH Great Prize by the Royal Institute of Technology in Stockholm.
- 2011: Received a Lifetime Achievement Award from the Oxford Internet Institute.
- 2013: Awarded H. M. The King's Medal (12th size) by King Carl XVI Gustaf of Sweden.
- 2014: Swedish Startup Hall of Fame
- 2015: Named Alumnus of the Year by Uppsala University.
