= List of video games developed in Estonia =

This is a list of released, cancelled and upcoming video games that are developed in Estonia. The list is sorted by game title, platform, year of release, developer, the Estonian city the developer is headquartered in, as well as the game's publisher. If a developer merely provided smaller-scale assistance to a larger development studio, they are not listed here.

While there are many video games presumed to have been developed in the country prior, this list starts with Kosmonaut, which was the first Estonian video game to be published on a wider commercial scale internationally.

== List ==
=== Personal computers and video game consoles ===
Title	Platform	Year	Developer	City	Publisher	Ref
Kosmonaut	DOS	1990	Bluemoon Software	Tallinn	(Sweden) Scandinavian PC Systems	
SkyRoads	DOS	1993	Bluemoon Software	Tallinn	(Sweden) Creative Dimensions	
SkyRoads: Xmas Special	DOS	1994	Bluemoon Software	Tallinn	(Sweden) Creative Dimensions	
Stellar Xpress	Unnamed VR gear	Cancelled	Bluemoon Software	Tallinn	Unnamed Texas-based VR company	
Roketz	Amiga 1200	1995	The FARM	Tallinn	(Estonia) The FARM	
Roketz	DOS	1996	Bluemoon Software	Tallinn	(Germany) Novitas GmbH	
Mars	Unnamed PC	Cancelled	Bluemoon Interactive	Tallinn	(United States) Hasbro Interactive	
Thunder Brigade	Windows	1998	Bluemoon Interactive	Tallinn	(United States) Interactive Magic	
Thunder Brigade 2	Windows	Cancelled	Bluemoon Interactive	Tallinn	(United States) Interactive Magic	
Air Offensive: The Art of Flying	Windows	2000	Bluemoon Interactive	Tallinn	(Germany) Brightstar Entertainment	
Siia-sinna läbi linna	Windows	2002	Kvadrum / Bluemoon Interactive	Tallinn	(Estonia) Laatse Liikluskaitse Leegion	
DarkSide Tetris	Windows	2007	Beau Monde Network	Pärnu	(Estonia) Beau Monde Network	
Teleglitch	Windows, Linux, macOS	2012	Test3 Projects	Tallinn	(Sweden) Paradox Interactive	
Uos	Windows, Linux	2014	SkisoSoft	Tartu	(Estonia) MTÜ Ekuubis	
RazerWire: Nanowars	Windows, Nintendo Switch, Xbox One, Xbox Series X/S	2018	Hammer&Ravens OÜ	Tallinn	(Poland) RedDeer.Games	
Disco Elysium	Windows, macOS	2019	ZA/UM	Tallinn	(Estonia) ZA/UM	
Shortest Trip to Earth	Windows, Linux	2019	Interactive Fate	Tartu	(Netherlands) Iceberg Interactive	
Voidship: The Long Journey	Windows	2019	Cydonian Games	Tallinn	(Estonia) Cydonian Games	
Death and Taxes	Windows, Linux, macOS, Switch	2020	Placeholder Gameworks	Tartu	(Estonia) Placeholder Gameworks	
Into the Radius	Windows	2020	CM Games	Tallinn	(Estonia) CM Games	
War Room	Windows	2020	Binge Gaming OU, Wastelands Interactive	Tallinn	(Estonia) Binge Gaming OU	
Disco Elysium - The Final Cut	Windows, macOS, PS4, PS5, Xbox One, Xbox Series, Switch, Stadia	2021	ZA/UM	Tallinn	(Estonia) ZA/UM	
Empires in Ruin	Windows	2021	Hammers&Ravens	Tallinn	(China) WhisperGames	
Encodya	Windows, Linux, macOS	2021	Chaosmonger Studio	Tallinn	(Germany) Assemble Entertainment	
Voidspeed Outlaw	Windows	2021	Cydonian Games	Tallinn	(Estonia) Cydonian Games	
Artist Life Simulator	Windows	2022	Interactive Fate	Tartu	(Estonia) Placeholder Gameworks	
Haiku, the Robot	Windows, macOS, Switch	2022	Mister Morris Games	Tallinn	(Estonia) Mister Morris Games	
Hunt and Fight	Windows, Android, Nintendo Switch, Xbox One, PlayStation 4, Xbox Series X/S, PlayStation 5	2022	StartImpulse, Two Cakes Studio OÜ	Tallinn	(Estonia) Two Cakes Studio OÜ	
Into the Radius	Quest	2022	CM Games	Tallinn	(Estonia) CM Games	
Buckshot Roulette	Windows, Linux	2023	Mike Klubnika	Tallinn	(Cyprus) Critical Reflex	
Dark Chess	Windows, Linux, macOS	2023	Tall Troll Games	Tallinn	(Estonia) Tall Troll Games, (China) Hawthorn Games	
Clunky Hero	Windows, Linux, macOS	2023	Chaosmonger Studio	Tallinn	(Estonia) Chaosmonger Studio	
Soul Tolerance: Prologue	Windows, Linux, macOS	2023	Chaosmonger Studio	Tallinn	(Estonia) Chaosmonger Studio	
Three Minutes To Eight	Windows, Linux, macOS	2023	Chaosmonger Studio	Tallinn	(Germany) Assemble Entertainment	
Ale Abbey	Windows	2024	Hammer&Ravens OÜ	Tallinn	(France) Shiro Unlimited	
Broken Alliance	Windows, Linux, macOS	2024	Placeholder Gameworks	Tartu	(China) Hawthorn Games	
Fight Life: Vanguard	Windows, Android	2024	StartImpulse, Two Cakes Studio OÜ	Tallinn	(Estonia) Two Cakes Studio OÜ	
Into the Radius 2	Windows	2024	CM Games	Tallinn	(Estonia) CM Games	
Rusty's Retirement	Windows, macOS	2024	Mister Morris Games	Tallinn	(Estonia) Mister Morris Games	
Time Trap: Hidden Objects Remastered	Windows, macOS, Android, Nintendo Switch, Xbox One, PlayStation 4, Xbox Series X/S	2024	Two Cakes Studio OÜ	Tallinn	(Estonia) Two Cakes Studio OÜ	
Tracery of Fate	Windows	2024	Sign Narva	Narva	(Estonia) Sign Narva	
Untraveled Lands: Chantico	Windows	2024	Tall Troll Games	Tallinn	(China) IndieArk	
CraftCraft: Fantasy Merchant Simulator	Windows, Linux, macOS	2025	Placeholder Gameworks	Tartu	(Estonia) Placeholder Gameworks, (China) Hawthorn Games	
Centum	Windows, macOS, Nintendo Switch, Xbox One, PlayStation 4, Xbox Series X/S, PlayStation 5	2025	Hack The Publisher	Tallinn	(United States) Serenity Forge	
IMMORTAL: And the Death that Follows	Windows, PS5, Xbox Series, Switch	TBA	Mishura Games	Tallinn	(Estonia) Mishura Games	
Let It Boom!	Windows	TBA	CM Games	Tallinn	(Estonia) CM Games	
Nitro Nation VR	Windows	TBA	CM Games	Tallinn	(Estonia) CM Games	
Overstep	Windows, Xbox One	TBA	Gamecan	Pärnu	(Estonia) Gamecan	
Schizollama	Windows, Linux, macOS, PS4, PS5, Xbox One, Xbox Series, Switch, iOS, Android	TBA	Chaosmonger Studio	Tallinn	(Estonia) Chaosmonger Studio	
White Sands	Windows	TBA	Binge Gaming OU	Tallinn	(Estonia) Binge Gaming OU	

=== Smartphones ===
Title	Platform	Year	Developer	City	Publisher	Ref
Drag Racing Classic	Android, iOS	2011	CM Games	Tallinn	(Estonia) CM Games	
Sky Cups	Android, iOS, Windows	2013	Fox3D Games	Tallinn	(Estonia) Fox3D Games	
Treasure Path	Android	2013	Fox3D Games	Tallinn	(Estonia) Fox3D Games	
Find A Hamster	Android	2013	Fox3D Games	Tallinn	(Estonia) Fox3D Games	
Zombie High Dive	Android, iOS	2014	PlayFlame	Rakvere	(United Kingdom) Chillingo	
Total Destruction	Android, iOS	2014	Morsakabi	Tartu	(Estonia) Morsakabi	
Nitro Nation Online	Android, Windows	2014	CM Games	Tallinn	(Estonia) CM Games	
Nitro Nation Online	iOS	2015	CM Games	Tallinn	(Estonia) CM Games	
Nitro Nation Stories	Android	2015	CM Games	Tallinn	(Estonia) CM Games	
House of Languages VR	Android	2015	Fox3D Games	Tallinn	(Estonia) Fox3D Games	
Cube Rule	Android, iOS	2015	PlayFlame	Rakvere	(Estonia) PlayFlame	
Zombie's Got a Pogo	Android, iOS	2015	PlayFlame	Rakvere	(Estonia) PlayFlame	
Oil Hunt	Android, iOS	2015	PlayFlame	Rakvere	(Estonia) PlayFlame	
Public Transport Simulator	Android, iOS	2015	SkisoSoft	Tartu	(Estonia) SkisoSoft	
Escape with Words	Android, iOS	2016	PlayFlame	Rakvere	(Estonia) PlayFlame	
Logic Puzzle Kingdom	Android, iOS	2016	Morsakabi	Tartu	(Estonia) Morsakabi	
Nitro Nation Stories	iOS	2016	CM Games	Tallinn	(Estonia) CM Games	
Fetty Wap: Nitro Nation Stories	Android, iOS	2016	CM Games	Tallinn	(Estonia) CM Games	
Cargo Transport Simulator	Android, iOS	2016	SkisoSoft	Tartu	(Estonia) SkisoSoft	
Oil Hunt 2 - Birthday Party	Android, iOS	2017	PlayFlame	Rakvere	(Estonia) PlayFlame	
Monster Fishing Legends	Android, iOS	2018	PlayFlame	Rakvere	(Estonia) PlayFlame	
Tic Tac Toe Logic	Android, iOS	2018	Morsakabi	Tartu	(Estonia) Morsakabi	
The X-Files: Deep State	Android, iOS, Facebook	2018	CM Games	Tallinn	(United States) FoxNext Games	
Bend!	iOS	2019	PlayFlame	Rakvere	(Estonia) PlayFlame	
PTS - Coach	Android, iOS	2019	SkisoSoft	Tartu	(Estonia) SkisoSoft	
Idle Panzer	Android, iOS	2021	Clickwork Games	Tallinn	(Estonia) Clickwork Games	
Warmasters: Turn-based RPG	Android, iOS	2021	CM Games	Tallinn	(Estonia) CM Games	
Dream Cats: Magic Adventure	Android	2021	CM Games	Tallinn	(Estonia) CM Games	
Police Patrol Simulator	Android, iOS	2021	SkisoSoft	Tartu	(Estonia) SkisoSoft	
Dream Cats: Magic Adventure	iOS	2022	CM Games	Tallinn	(Estonia) CM Games	
Café Dash: Dinner at the Diner	Android, iOS	2022	Friedegggames	Sillamäe	(Cyprus) MAD PIXEL	
Clinic Dash: Crazy Fun Hospital	Android, iOS	2023	Friedegggames	Sillamäe	(Cyprus) MAD PIXEL	
Nitro Nation World Tour	Android, iOS	2023	CM Games	Tallinn	(United States) Mythical Games	
Public Transport Simulator 2	Android	2024	SkisoSoft	Tartu	(Estonia) SkisoSoft	
EarthRush	unnamed tablet device	TBA	Fox3D Games	Tallinn	(Estonia) Fox3D Games	
