= Singularity Summit =

Annual conference

Logo for the 2009 summit

Attendees at the 2009 Singularity Summit

Eliezer Yudkowsky and James Hughes at the 2007 Singularity Summit

Peter Thiel at the 2007 Singularity Summit

The Singularity Summit was the annual conference of the Machine Intelligence Research Institute. It was started in 2006 at Stanford University by Ray Kurzweil, Eliezer Yudkowsky, and Peter Thiel, and the subsequent summits in 2007, 2008, 2009, 2010, 2011, and 2012 have been held in San Francisco, San Jose, New York City, San Francisco, New York City, and San Francisco respectively. Some speakers have included Sebastian Thrun, Rodney Brooks, Barney Pell, Marshall Brain, Justin Rattner, Peter Diamandis, Stephen Wolfram, Gregory Benford, Robin Hanson, Anders Sandberg, Juergen Schmidhuber, Aubrey de Grey, Max Tegmark, and Michael Shermer.

There have also been spinoff conferences in Melbourne, Australia in 2010, 2011 and 2012. Previous speakers include David Chalmers, Lawrence Krauss, Gregory Benford, Ben Goertzel, Steve Omohundro, Hugo de Garis, Marcus Hutter, Mark Pesce, Stelarc and Randal A. Koene.

== 2006 ==
The first Singularity Summit took place in 2006 at Stanford University.

Speakers

Nick Bostrom, Todd Davies, Cory Doctorow, K. Eric Drexler, Tyler Emerson, Douglas Hofstadter, Ray Kurzweil, Bill McKibben, Max More, Christine Peterson, John Smart, Peter Thiel, Sebastian Thrun, Eliezer Yudkowsky.

== 2007 ==
The second Singularity Summit took place in 2007 in San Francisco.

Speakers

Sam Adams, Rodney Brooks, Jamais Cascio, Tyler Emerson, Ben Goertzel, J. Storrs Hall, Charles L. Harper Jr, James Hughes, Neil Jacobstein, Steve Jurvetson, Ray Kurzweil, Peter Norvig, Stephen M. Omohundro, Barney Pell, Christine L. Peterson, Paul Saffo, Peter Thiel, Peter Voss, Wendell Wallach, Eliezer Yudkowsky

== 2008 ==
The 2008 Singularity Summit took place in San Jose.

Speakers

Eric Baum, Marshall Brain, Cynthia Breazeal, Peter Diamandis, Esther Dyson, Pete Estep, Neil Gershenfeld, Ben Goertzel, John Horgan, Ray Kurzweil, Jame Miller, Dharmendra Modha, Bob Pisani, Justin Rattner, Nova Spivack, Vernor Vinge, Glen Zorpette

== 2009 ==
The 2009 Singularity Summit took place in New York.

Speakers

Itamar Arel, Gregory Benford, Ed Boyden, David Chalmers, Aubrey de Grey, Gary Drescher, Ben Goertzel, Stuart Hameroff, Robin Hanson, Marcus Hutter, Randal Koene, Ray Kurzweil, Gary Marcus, Bela Nagy, Michael Nielsen, Anna Salamon, Anders Sandberg, Jurgen Schmidhuber, Brad Templeton, Peter Thiel, Michael Vassar, Gary Wolf, Stephen Wolfram, Eliezer Yudkowsky

== 2010 ==
The 2010 Singularity Summit took place in San Francisco.

Speakers

Lance Becker, Dennis Bray, Ben Goertzel, David Hanson, Demis Hassabis, Ellen Heber-Katz, Ray Kurzweil, Shane Legg, Brian Litt, Steven Mann, Ramez Naam, Irene Pepperberg, James Randi, Terry Sejnowski, Mandayam Srinivasan, Gregory Stock, John Tooby, Michael Vassar, Eliezer Yudkowsky

== 2011 ==
The 2011 Singularity Summit took place in New York on October 15 and 16, 2011.

Speakers

Sonia Arrison, Stephen Badylak, David Brin, Scott Brown, Dan Cerutti, Tyler Cowen, Riley Crane, David Ferrucci, Dileep George, Dmitry Itskov, Ken Jennings, Christof Koch, Ray Kurzweil, John Mauldin, Sharon Bertsch McGrayne, James McLurkin, Michael Shermer, Jason Silva, Jaan Tallinn, Max Tegmark, Peter Thiel, Michael Vassar, Alexander Wissner-Gross, Stephen Wolfram, Eliezer Yudkowsky

== 2012 ==
The 2012 Singularity Summit took place on October 13–14, at Nob Hill Masonic Center, San Francisco.

Speakers

Stuart Armstrong, Linda Avey, Laura Deming, Julia Galef, Temple Grandin, Robin Hanson, Daniel Kahneman, James Koppel, Ray Kurzweil, Nathan Labenz, Melanie Mitchell, Luke Muehlhauser, Peter Norvig, Christopher Olah, Steven Pinker, Noor Siddiqui, Jaan Tallinn, Vernor Vinge, John Wilbanks, Carl Zimmer
