= Priit Kasesalu =

Estonian programmer and software developer

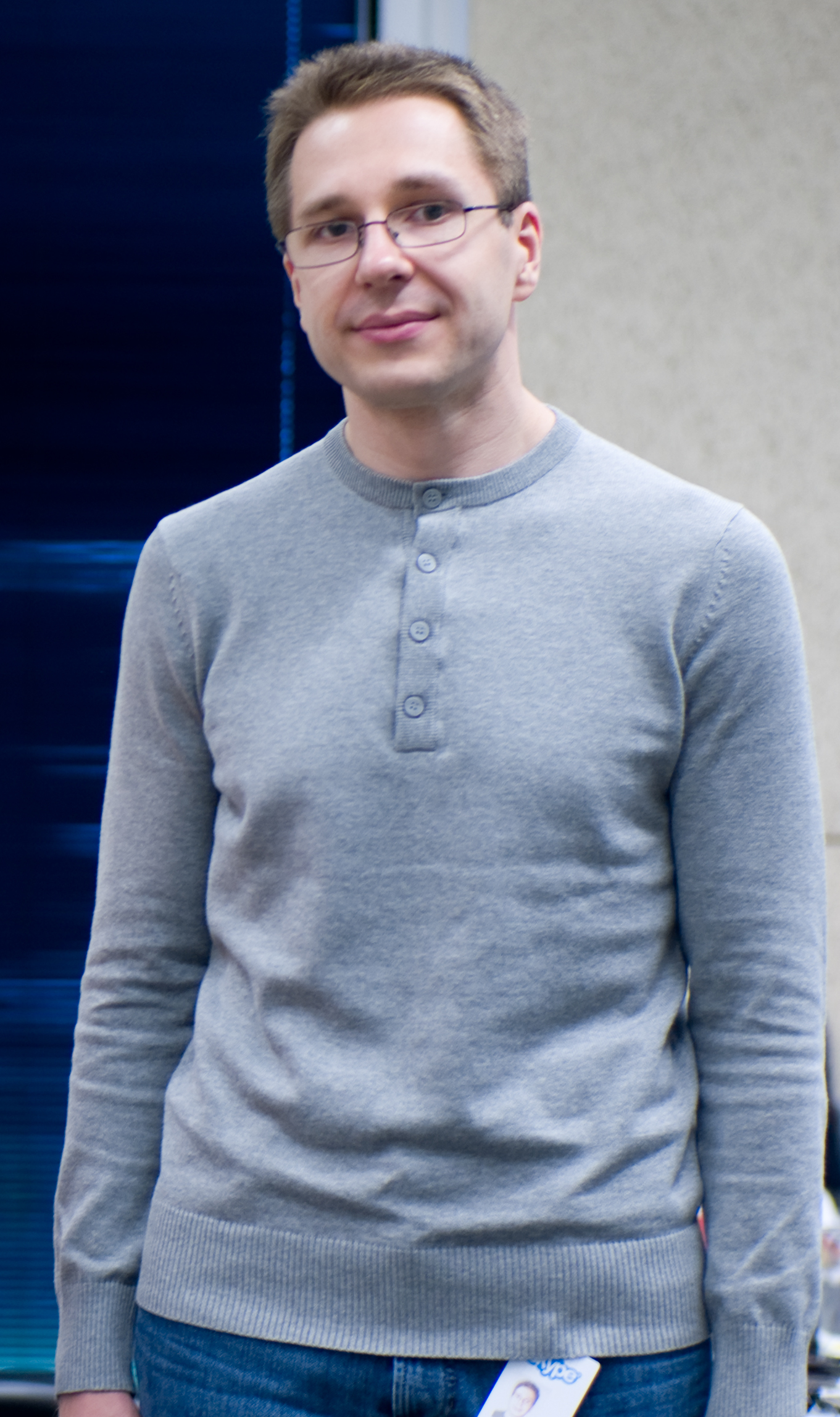
Kasesalu in 2007

Priit Kasesalu (born 10 April 1972) is an Estonian programmer and software developer best known for his participation in the development of Kazaa, Skype and, most recently, Joost. He currently works for Ambient Sound Investments and lives in Tallinn, Estonia.

== Biography ==
He started off as programmer for a local hardware manufacturer in 1986 with his class-mate Jaan Tallinn. The company was assembling 8-bit computers for use in public schools.

In 1992 he studied computer science at Tallinn Technical University.

On 7 June 1993, he and Jaan officially registered BlueMoon as a privately held Estonian software company.

== Work ==
In 1989 he created the first Estonian commercial computer game with Ahti Heinla and Jaan Tallinn, Kosmonaut. This was later remade as SkyRoads and has been further remade/adapted by other companies numerous times.

In 2003 he helped develop Skype with Janus Friis and Niklas Zennström, as well as Heinla and Tallinn. These five also developed Kazaa and Joost.

He has made various contributions to SubSpace under the username PriitK, particularly the Continuum client.

=== Projects ===
The following is a list of projects participated in by Priit Kasesalu.

- Kosmonaut (1992)
- SkyRoads (1993)
- Sound Club (1993)
- Tigma SuperScroll (1995)
- Roketz (PC platform, 1995)
- The Art of Flying (1996)
- Sequel to Sound Club (1996)
- Thunder Brigade (1998)
- Subspace Continuum (1995)
- Kazaa (2001)
- Skype (2003)
- Joost (2006)

== See also ==
- Jaan Tallinn
- Ahti Heinla
