= Skype =

Retired telecommunications software service/application

- Skype 8 for Windows
- Original authors: Priit Kasesalu and Jaan Tallinn
- Developers: Skype Technologies (2003–2011); Microsoft (2011–2025)
- Release: 29 August 2003 (23 years ago)

Final release(s) [±]
- Windows, UWP, discontinued: 15.150.3125.0 / 5 May 2025; 18 months ago
- Windows, desktop, discontinued: 8.150.0.125 / 5 May 2025; 18 months ago
- macOS, discontinued: 8.150.0.125 / 5 May 2025; 18 months ago
- Linux, discontinued: 8.150.0.125 / 5 May 2025; 18 months ago
- Android, discontinued: 8.150.0.125 / 5 May 2025; 18 months ago
- iOS, discontinued: 8.150.0.125 / 5 May 2025; 18 months ago
- Operating system: Windows, Windows Server, Windows Phone, macOS, Linux, Android, iOS, iPadOS, WatchOS, Wear OS, HoloLens, Xbox One, Xbox Series X/S
- Predecessor: MSN Messenger
- Successor: Microsoft Teams
- Available in: 108 languages
- Type: Videoconferencing, VoIP and Instant messaging
- License: Proprietary software
- Website: www.skype.com (archived January 2025)

Skype (/skaɪp/) was a proprietary telecommunications application operated by Skype Technologies, an acquired division of Microsoft, best known for IP-based videotelephony, videoconferencing and voice calls. It also had instant messaging, file transfer, debit-based calls to landline and mobile telephones (over traditional telephone networks), and other features. It was available on various desktop, mobile, and video game console platforms.

Skype was created by Niklas Zennström, Janus Friis, and four Estonian developers, and first released on August 29, 2003. In September 2005, eBay acquired it for $2.6 billion. In September 2009, Silver Lake, Andreessen Horowitz, and the Canada Pension Plan Investment Board bought 65% of Skype for $1.9 billion from eBay, valuing the business at $2.92 billion. In May 2011, Microsoft bought Skype for $8.5 billion and used it to replace its own Windows Live Messenger. As of 2011, most of the development team and 44% of all the division's employees were in Tallinn and Tartu, Estonia.

Skype originally featured a hybrid peer-to-peer and client–server system. It became entirely powered by Microsoft-operated supernodes in May 2012; in 2017, it changed from a peer-to-peer service to a centralized Azure-based service. In February 2023, it was used by 36 million people each day.

The service was retired on 5 May 2025, and the website now redirects users to Microsoft Teams; however, the Skype Dial Pad remains functional for users with paid services.

== Etymology ==
The name for the software was derived from the words "sky" and "peer-to-peer", the latter of which described the software's network architecture. This was then abbreviated to "Skyper"; however, some of the domain names for Skyper were already taken. By dropping the final "r", the title became "Skype", for which domain names were available at the time.

== History ==
Skype logo (2003 - 2006)

Skype icon (2006–2012)

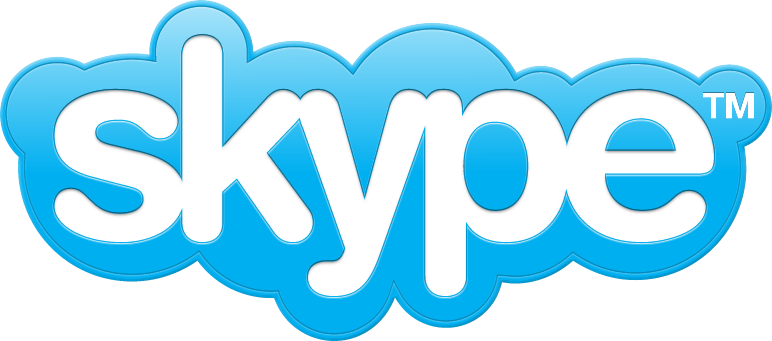
Skype logo (2006–2012)

Skype was founded in 2003 by Niklas Zennström, from Sweden, and Janus Friis, from Denmark. The software was created by Estonians Ahti Heinla, Priit Kasesalu, Jaan Tallinn, and Toivo Annus. Friis and Annus are credited with the idea of reducing the cost of voice calls by using a P2P protocol like that of Kazaa. An early alpha version was created and tested in spring 2003, and the first public beta version was released on 29 August 2003.

In June 2005, Skype entered an agreement with Polish web portal Onet.pl for an integrated offering on the Polish market. On 12 September 2005, eBay Inc. agreed to acquire Luxembourg-based Skype Technologies SA for approximately US$2.5 billion in up-front cash and eBay stock, plus potential performance-based consideration. On 1 September 2009, eBay announced it was selling 65% of Skype to Silver Lake, Andreessen Horowitz, and the Canada Pension Plan Investment Board for US$1.9 billion, valuing Skype at US$2.75 billion. On 14 July 2011, Skype partnered with Comcast to bring its video chat service to Comcast subscribers via HDTV sets.

On 17 June 2013, Skype released free video messaging services for Windows, Mac OS, iOS, iPadOS, Android, and BlackBerry.

Between 2017 and 2020, Skype collaborated with PayPal to provide a money-send feature, enabling users to transfer funds via the Skype mobile app in the middle of a conversation.

=== Microsoft acquisition ===
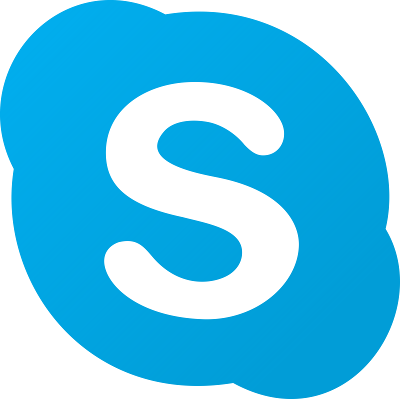
Skype icon (2012–2017)

Skype logo (2012–2017)

Skype icon with updated logo (2017–2019)

On 10 May 2011, Microsoft Corporation acquired Skype Communications, S.à r.l for US$8.5 billion. It was incorporated as a division of Microsoft, which acquired all its technologies with the purchase. The acquisition was completed on 13 October 2011. Microsoft began integrating the Skype service with its own products. Along with taking over the development of existing Skype desktop and mobile apps, it developed a dedicated client app for its then-newly released, touch-focused Windows 8 and Windows RT operating systems, which were made available from Windows Store when the then-new OS launched on 26 October 2012. The following year, it became the default messaging app for Windows 8.1, replacing the Windows 8 Messaging app at the time, and was pre-installed on every device that came with or upgraded to 8.1.

In a month-long transition from 8 to 30 April 2013, Microsoft discontinued its Windows Live Messenger service globally, except in mainland China where it continued to be available until October 2014.

On 11 November 2014, Microsoft announced that in 2015, its Lync product would be replaced by Skype for Business, combining the features of Lync and the consumer Skype software. Organizations that used it could switch their users between the default Skype for Business interface and the Lync interface.

=== Post-acquisition ===
On 12 August 2013, Skype released the 4.10 update for Apple iPhone and iPad apps that allowed HD quality video for iPhone 5 and fourth-generation iPads.

On 20 November 2014, Microsoft Office's team announced that a new chat powered by Skype would be implemented in their software, enabling users to chat with co-workers in the same document.

On 15 September 2015, Skype announced the release of Mojis ("a brand new way to express yourself on Skype")—short video clips and GIFs featuring characters from films and TV shows that could be entered into conversations like emoticons. Skype worked with Universal Studios, Disney Muppets, BBC and other studios to enhance the Mojis collection. Later that year, Gurdeep Singh Pall, Corporate Vice President of Skype, announced that Microsoft had acquired the technology from Talko.

In July 2016, Skype introduced an early Alpha version of a new Skype for Linux client, built with WebRTC technology, after several petitions asked Microsoft to continue development for Linux. In September of that year, Skype updated their iOS app with new features, including an option to call contacts on Skype through Siri voice commands. In October of that year, Microsoft launched Skype for Business for Mac.

In February 2017, Microsoft announced plans to discontinue its Skype Wi-Fi service globally. The application was delisted, and the service itself became non-functional from 31 March 2017. On 5 June 2017, Microsoft announced its plans to revamp Skype with similar features to Snapchat, allowing users to share temporary copies of their photos and video files. In late June 2017, Microsoft rolled out their latest update for iOS, incorporating a revamped design and new third-party integrations, with platforms including Gfycat, YouTube, and UpWorthy. It was not well-received, with numerous negative reviews and complaints that the new client broke existing functionality. Skype later removed this "makeover". In December 2017, Microsoft added "Skype Interviews", a shared code editing system for those wishing to hold job interviews for programming roles.

In April 2017, Microsoft eventually moved the service from a peer-to-peer to a central server based system, enabling cloud-based storage of text messages/pictures and temporary 30-day storage of videos/file attachments/voice messages/call recordings. It also adjusted the user interfaces of apps to make text-based messaging more prominent than voice calling. Skype for Windows, iOS, Android, Mac and Linux all received significant visual overhauls at this time. Users with legacy Skype accounts were able to retain their usernames, while new users are no longer able to manually choose a username. New user registrations associated with a Microsoft account were assigned a username with a live: prefix followed by an autogenerated alphanumeric string.

In 2019, Skype was declared the sixth most-downloaded mobile app of the decade, from 2010 to 2019.

In February 2025, Microsoft announced that Skype would be retired on 5 May 2025, to be replaced with the free version of Microsoft Teams.

== Features ==
Registered users of Skype were identified by a unique Skype ID and may be listed in the Skype directory under a Skype username. Skype allowed these registered users to communicate through both instant messaging and voice chat. Voice chat allowed telephone calls between pairs of users and conference calling and used proprietary audio codec. Skype's text chat client allowed group chats, emoticons, storing chat history, and editing of previous messages. Offline messages were implemented in a beta build of version 5 but removed after a few weeks without notification. The usual features familiar to instant messaging users—user profiles, online status indicators, and so on—are also included.

The Online Number, a.k.a. SkypeIn, service allowed Skype users to receive calls on their computers dialed by conventional phone subscribers to a local Skype phone number; local numbers are available for Australia, Belgium, Brazil, Chile, Colombia, Denmark, the Dominican Republic, Estonia, Finland, France, Germany, Hong Kong, Hungary, India, Ireland, Japan, Mexico, Nepal, New Zealand, Poland, Romania, South Africa, South Korea, Sweden, Switzerland, Turkey, the Netherlands, the United Kingdom, and the United States. A Skype user could have local numbers in any of these countries, with calls to the number charged at the same rate as calls to fixed lines in the country.

Skype supported conference calls, video chats, and screen sharing between 25 people at a time for free, which then increased to 50 on 5 April 2019.

Skype did not provide the ability to call emergency numbers, such as 112 in Europe, 911 in North America, 999 in the UK or 100 in India and Nepal. However, as of December 2012, there was limited support for emergency calls in the United Kingdom, Australia, Denmark, and Finland. The U.S. Federal Communications Commission (FCC) has ruled that, for the purposes of section 255 of the Telecommunications Act, Skype was not an "interconnected VoIP provider". As a result, the U.S. National Emergency Number Association recommended that all VoIP users have an analog line available as a backup.

In 2019, Skype added an option to blur the background in a video chat interface using AI algorithms purely done using software, despite a depth-sensing camera not being present in most webcams.

In 2023, Skype added the Bing AI chatbot to the platform for users who had access to the chatbot.

== Usage and traffic ==
Usage and traffic
Date	Total user accounts (millions)	Active users, daily use (millions)	Skype to Skype minutes (billions)	SkypeOut minutes (billions)	Revenue USD (millions)
Q4 2005	74.7	10.8	—N/a	—N/a	—N/a
Q1 2006	94.6	15.2	6.9	0.7	35
Q2 2006	113.1	16.6	7.1	0.8	44
Q3 2006	135.9	18.7	6.6	1.1	50
Q4 2006	171.2	21.2	7.6	1.5	66
Q1 2007	195.5	23.2	7.7	1.3	79
Q2 2007	219.6	23.9	7.1	1.3	90
Q3 2007	245.7	24.2	6.1	1.4	98
Q4 2007	276.3	27.0	11.9	1.6	115
Q1 2008	309.3	31.3	14.2	1.7	126
Q2 2008	338.2	32.0	14.8	1.9	136
Q3 2008	370	33.7	16.0	2.2	143
Q4 2008	405	36.5	20.5	2.6	145
Q1 2009	443	42.2	23.6	2.9	153
Q2 2009	483	?	25.5	3.0	170
Q3 2009	521	?	27.7	3.1	185
Q4 2009	560	?	36.1	?	?
Q1 2010	?	?	190	12.8	860
Q2 2010	?	?	?	?	?
Q3 2010	?	?	?	?	?
Q4 2010	?	?	?	?	?
Q1 2011	?	?	?	?	?
Q2 2011	?	?	?	?	?
Q3 2011	663	?	?	?	?
Q4 2011	?	?	?	?	?
Q1 2012	?	?	?	?	?
Q2 2012	?	?	?	?	?
Users may have had more than one account; it is not possible to count users, only accounts. The volume of international traffic routed via Skype was significant. In 2009 it was considered the largest international voice carrier (by minutes of calls).

Year	International call market share
2005	2.9%
2006	4.4%
2008	8%
2009	12%
2010	13%
2012	33%
2013	36%
2014	40%

At the end of 2010, there were over 660 million worldwide users, with over 300 million estimated active each month as of August 2015. At one point in February 2012, there were 34 million users concurrently online on Skype.

In January 2011, after the release of video calling on the Skype client for iPhone, Skype reached a record 27 million simultaneous online users. This record was broken with 29 million simultaneous online users on 21 February 2011 and again on 28 March 2011 with 30 million online users. On 25 February 2012, Skype announced that it has over 32 million users for the first time ever. By 5 March 2012, it had 36 million simultaneous online users, and less than a year later, on 21 January 2013, Skype had more than 50 million concurrent users online. In June 2012, Skype had surpassed 70 million downloads on Android.

On 19 July 2012, Microsoft announced that Skype users had logged 115 billion minutes of calls in the quarter, up to 50% since the last quarter.

On 15 January 2014, TeleGeography estimated that Skype-to-Skype international traffic has gone up to 36% in 2013 to 214 billion minutes.

As of March 2020, Skype was used by 100 million people at least once a month and by 40 million people each day.

At the end of March 2020 there was a 70% increase in the number of daily users from the previous month, due to the COVID-19 pandemic. However, Skype also lost a large part of its market share to Zoom.

Skype had continued to experience daily user decline since the pandemic, with the daily user count falling to 36 million in 2023, despite Microsoft's effort to promote Skype in their other services such as Microsoft Outlook. The success of Microsoft Teams has been cited as causing businesses to abandon Skype, with Teams reaching 300 million active users in the 2nd quarter of 2023.

== Closure ==
Microsoft stated on its website Skype would be retired on 5 May 2025 to be replaced with Microsoft Teams for more "modern communications". It also mentioned that users will have the option to sign into Teams on any device that supported Skype credentials, as well as giving users the option to export their Skype data if they do not wish to use Teams. This closure was finalized on 5 May 2025. Existing credit balance for outgoing phone calls can be used via a Skype Dial Pad web application, but no new credit can be purchased.

Users were originally given until January 2026 to export their Skype data; otherwise it would be deleted after the deadline has passed. However, on 20 December 2025, Microsoft announced on its support page for exporting Skype data that the deadline has been extended to June 2026.

== System and software ==
=== Client applications and devices ===
==== Windows client ====
Skype 4.0 (released 2009)

Multiple different versions of Skype had been released for Windows since its conception. The original line of Skype applications continued from versions 1.0 through 4.0. It had offered a desktop-only program since 2003. Later, a mobile version was created for Windows Phones.

In 2012, Skype introduced a new version for Windows 8 similar to the Windows Phone version. On 7 July 2015, Skype modified the application to direct Windows users to download the desktop version, but it was set to continue working on Windows RT until October 2016. In November 2015, Skype introduced three new applications, called Messaging, Skype Video, and Phone, intended to provide an integrated Skype experience on Windows 10. On 24 March 2016, Skype announced that the integrated applications did not satisfy most users' needs and announced that they and the desktop client would eventually be replaced with a new UWP application, which was released as a preview version for the Windows 10 Anniversary Update and dubbed as the stable version with the release of the Windows 10 Creators Update.

The last version of Skype for Windows was Skype 12, which was based on the Universal Windows Platform and runs on various Windows 10-related systems, including Xbox One, Xbox Series X/S, Windows phones, and Microsoft HoloLens. At the time of closure, Microsoft still offered the older Skype 8, which was Win32-based and ran on all systems from Windows XP (which is otherwise unsupported by Microsoft) to Windows 10.

==== Other desktop clients ====
- macOS (10.9 or newer)
- Linux (Debian, Debian-based (Ubuntu, etc.), Fedora, openSUSE)

==== Mobile clients ====
- iOS
- Android

Skype formerly provided a client for feature phones that ran on J2ME, Nokia X, Symbian, BlackBerry OS and BlackBerry 10 devices. In May 2009, a Version 3.0 was available on Windows Mobile 5 to 6.1, and in September 2015, a Version 2.29 was available on Windows Phone 8.1; in 2016, Microsoft announced that this would stop working in early 2017 once Skype's transition from peer-to-peer to client-server was complete.

==== Other platforms ====
- The Nokia N800, N810, and N900 Internet tablets, which run Maemo
- The Nokia N9, which runs MeeGo, comes with Skype voice calling and text messaging integrated; however, it lacks video calling.
- Both the Sony Mylo COM-1 and COM-2 models
- The PlayStation Portable Slim and Lite series, though the user needs to purchase a specially designed microphone peripheral. The PSP-3000 has a built-in microphone, which allows communication without the Skype peripheral. The PSP Go has the ability to use Bluetooth connections with the Skype application, in addition to its built-in microphone. Skype for PlayStation Vita may be downloaded via the PlayStation Network in the U.S. It includes the capability to receive incoming calls with the application running in the background. Skype for PlayStation Portable and PlayStation Vita was discontinued on June 22, 2016.
- The Samsung Smart TV had a Skype app, which could be downloaded for free. It used the built-in camera and microphone for the newer models. Alternatively, a separate mountable Skype camera with built-in speakers and microphones is available to purchase for older models. This functionality has now been disabled, along with any other "TV Based" Skype clients.
- Some devices were made to work with Skype by talking to a desktop Skype client or by embedding Skype software into the device. These were usually either tethered to a PC or had a built-in Wi-Fi client to allow calling from Wi-Fi hotspots, like the Netgear SPH101 Skype Wi-Fi Phone, the SMC WSKP100 Skype Wi-Fi Phone, the Belkin F1PP000GN-SK Wi-Fi Skype Phone, the Panasonic KX-WP1050 Wi-Fi Phone for Skype Executive Travel Set, the IPEVO So-20 Wi-Fi Phone for Skype, and the Linksys CIT200 Wi-Fi Phone.
- 3G Skypephone, created in collaboration between Skype and 3 in 2007

==== Third-party licensing ====
Third-party developers, such as Truphone, Nimbuzz, and Fring, previously allowed Skype to run in parallel with several other competing VoIP/IM networks (Truphone and Nimbuzz provide TruphoneOut and NimbuzzOut as a competing paid service) in any Symbian or Java environment. Nimbuzz made Skype available to BlackBerry users, and Fring provided mobile video calling over Skype as well as support for the Android platform. Skype disabled access to Skype by Fring users in July 2010. Nimbuzz discontinued support of Skype on request in October 2010.

Before and during the Microsoft acquisition, Skype withdrew licensing from several third parties producing software and hardware compatible with Skype. The Skype for Asterisk product from Digium was withdrawn as "no longer available for sale". The Senao SN358+ long-range (10–15 km) cordless phone was discontinued due to loss of licenses to participate in the Skype network as peers. In combination, these two products made it possible to create roaming cordless mesh networks with a robust handoff.

== Technology ==
=== Protocol ===
Skype used a proprietary Internet telephony (VoIP) network called the Skype protocol. The protocol had not been made publicly available by Skype, and official applications using the protocol were also proprietary. Part of the Skype technology relied on the Global Index P2P protocol belonging to the Joltid Ltd. corporation. The main difference between Skype and standard VoIP clients was that Skype operated on a peer-to-peer model (originally based on the Kazaa software), rather than the more usual client-server model (note that the very popular Session Initiation Protocol (SIP) model of VoIP is also peer-to-peer, but implementation generally requires registration with a server, as did Skype).

On 20 June 2014, Microsoft announced the deprecation of the old Skype protocol. Within several months from this date, in order to continue using Skype services, Skype users would have to update to Skype applications released in 2014. The new Skype protocol, Microsoft Notification Protocol 24, was released. The deprecation became effective in the second week of August 2014. Transferred files were saved on central servers after this change.

As far as networking stack support is concerned, Skype only supported the IPv4 protocol. It lacked support for the next-generation Internet Protocol, IPv6. Skype for Business, however, includes support for IPv6 addresses, along with continued support of IPv4.

=== Protocol detection and control ===
Many networking and security companies had claimed to detect and control Skype's protocol for enterprise and carrier applications. While the specific detection methods used by these companies were often private, Pearson's chi-squared test and naive Bayes classification were two approaches that were published in 2008. Combining statistical measurements of payload properties (such as byte frequencies and initial byte sequences) as well as flow properties (like packet sizes and packet directions) had also shown to be an effective method for identifying Skype's TCP- and UDP-based protocols.

=== Audio codecs ===
Skype 2.x used G.729, Skype 3.2 introduced SVOPC, and Skype 4.0 added a Skype-created codec called SILK, intended to be "lightweight and embeddable". Additionally, Skype had released Opus as a free codec, which integrates the SILK codec principles for voice transmission with the CELT codec principles for higher-quality audio transmissions, such as live music performances. Opus was submitted to the Internet Engineering Task Force (IETF) in September 2010. Since then, it has been standardized as RFC 6716.

=== Video codecs ===
VP7 was used for versions prior to Skype 5.5.

As of version 7.0, H.264 was used for both group and one-on-one video chat, at standard definition, 720p, and 1080p high-definition.

=== Skype Qik ===
Skype acquired the video service Qik in 2011. After shutting down Qik in April 2014, Skype relaunched the service as Skype Qik on 14 October 2014. Although Qik offered video conferencing and Internet streaming, the new service focused on mobile video messaging between individuals and groups.

=== Hyperlink format ===
Skype used URIs as skype:USER?call for a call.

== Security and privacy ==
Skype was claimed initially to be a secure communication, with one of its early web pages stating "highly secure with end-to-end encryption". Security services were invisible to the user, and encryption could not be disabled. Skype claimed to use publicly documented, widely trusted encryption techniques for Skype-to-Skype communication: RSA for key negotiation and the Advanced Encryption Standard to encrypt conversations. However, it is impossible to verify that these algorithms are used correctly, completely, and at all times, as there is no public review possible without a protocol specification or the program's source code. Skype provided an uncontrolled registration system for users with no proof of identity. Instead, users might choose a screen name that does not have to relate to their real-life identity in any way; a name chosen could also be an impersonation attempt, where the user claims to be someone else for fraudulent purposes. A third-party paper analyzing the security and methodology of Skype was presented at Black Hat Europe 2006. It analyzed Skype and found a number of security issues with the then-current security model.

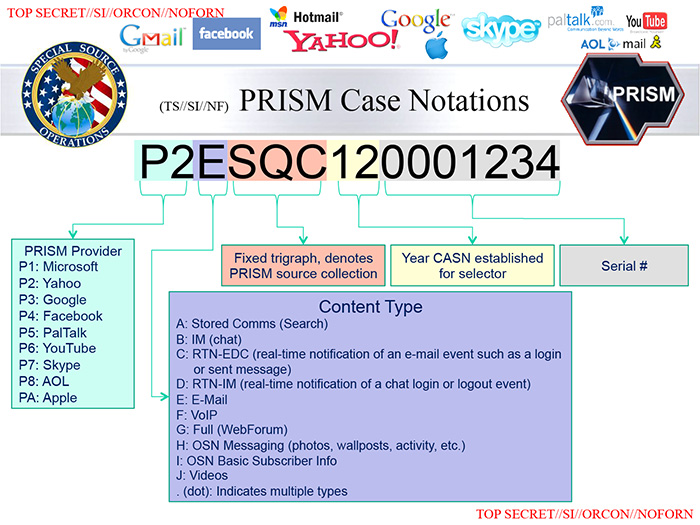
PRISM: a clandestine surveillance program under which the NSA collects user data from companies like Skype and Facebook

Skype incorporated some features that tended to hide its traffic, but it was not specifically designed to thwart traffic analysis and therefore did not provide anonymous communication. Some researchers had been able to watermark the traffic so that it was identifiable even after passing through an anonymizing network.

In an interview, Kurt Sauer, the Chief Security Officer of Skype, said, "We provide a safe communication option. I will not tell you whether we can listen or not." This did not deny the fact that the U.S. National Security Agency (NSA) monitored Skype conversations. Skype's client used an undocumented and proprietary protocol. The Free Software Foundation (FSF) was concerned about user privacy issues arising from using proprietary software and protocols and had made a replacement for Skype one of their high-priority projects. Security researchers Biondi and Desclaux had speculated that Skype might have a back door, since Skype sent traffic even when it was turned off and because Skype had taken extreme measures to obfuscate the program's traffic and functioning. Several media sources reported that at a meeting about the "Lawful interception of IP based services" held on 25 June 2008, high-ranking unnamed officials at the Austrian interior ministry said that they could listen in on Skype conversations without problems. The Austrian public broadcasting service ORF, citing minutes from the meeting, reported that "the Austrian police are able to listen in on Skype connections". Skype declined to comment on the reports. One easily demonstrated method of monitoring was to set up two computers with the same Skype user ID and password. When a message was typed or a call was received on one computer, the second computer duplicated the audio and text. This required knowledge of the user ID and password.

The United States Federal Communications Commission (FCC) has interpreted the Communications Assistance for Law Enforcement Act (CALEA) as requiring digital phone networks to allow wiretapping if authorized by an FBI warrant, in the same way as other phone services. In February 2009, Skype said that, not being a telephone company owning phone lines, it is exempt from CALEA and similar laws, which regulate US phone companies, and it is not clear whether Skype could support wiretapping even if it wanted to. According to the ACLU, the Act is inconsistent with the original intent of the Fourth Amendment to the U.S. Constitution; more recently, the ACLU has expressed concern that the FCC interpretation of the Act is incorrect. It has been suggested that Microsoft made changes to Skype's infrastructure to ease various wiretapping requirements; however, Skype denies the claims.

Sometime before Skype was sold in 2009, the company had started Project Chess, a program to explore legal and technical ways to easily share calls with intelligence agencies and law enforcement.

On 20 February 2009, the European Union's Eurojust agency announced that the Italian Desk at Eurojust would "play a key role in the coordination and cooperation of the investigations on the use of internet telephony systems (VoIP), such as 'Skype'. [...] The purpose of Eurojust's coordination role is to overcome the technical and judicial obstacles to the interception of internet telephony systems, taking into account the various data protection rules and civil rights."

In November 2010, a flaw was disclosed to Skype that showed how computer crackers could secretly track any user's IP address. Due to Skype's peer-to-peer nature, this was a difficult issue to address, but this bug was eventually remedied in a 2016 update.

In 2012, Skype introduced automatic updates to better protect users from security risks, but received some challenge from users of the Mac product, as the updates cannot be disabled from version 5.6 on, both on Mac OS and Windows versions, although in the latter, and only from version 5.9 on, automatic updating can be turned off in certain cases.

According to a 2012 Washington Post article, Skype "has expanded its cooperation with law enforcement authorities to make online chats and other user information available to police"; the article additionally mentions that Skype made changes to allow authorities access to addresses and credit card numbers.

In November 2012, Skype was reported to have handed over user data of a pro-WikiLeaks activist to Dallas, Texas-based private security company iSIGHT Partners without a warrant or court order. The alleged handover would be a breach of Skype's privacy policy. Skype responded with a statement that it launched an internal investigation to probe the breach of user data privacy.

On 13 November 2012, a Russian user published a flaw in Skype's security that allowed any person to take over a Skype account knowing only the victim's email by following seven steps. This vulnerability was claimed to exist for months and existed for more than 12 hours after being published widely.

On 14 May 2013, it was documented that a URL sent via a Skype instant messaging session was usurped by the Skype service and subsequently used in a HTTP HEAD query originating from an IP address registered to Microsoft in Redmond (the IP address used was 65.52.100.214). The Microsoft query used the full URL supplied in the IM conversation and was generated by a previously undocumented security service. Security experts speculate that the action was triggered by a technology similar to Microsoft's SmartScreen Filter used in its browsers.

The 2013 mass surveillance disclosures revealed that agencies such as the NSA and the FBI have the ability to eavesdrop on Skype, including the monitoring and storage of text and video calls and file transfers. The PRISM surveillance program, which requires FISA court authorization, reportedly has allowed the NSA unfettered access to its data center supernodes. According to the leaked documents, integration work began in November 2010, but it was not until February 2011 that the company was served with a directive to comply signed by the attorney general, with NSA documents showing that collection began on 31 March 2011.

On 10 November 2014, Skype scored 1 out of 7 points on the Electronic Frontier Foundation's secure messaging scorecard. Skype received a point for encryption during transit but lost points because communications are not encrypted with a key the provider does not have access to (i.e., the communications are not end-to-end encrypted), users cannot verify contacts' identities, past messages are not secure if the encryption keys are stolen (i.e., the service does not provide forward secrecy), the code is not open to independent review (i.e., not available to merely view, nor under a free-software license), the security design is not properly documented, and there has not been a recent independent security audit. AIM, BlackBerry Messenger, Ebuddy XMS, Hushmail, Kik Messenger, Viber, and Yahoo Messenger also scored 1 out of 7 points.

As of August 2018, Skype now supported end-to-end encryption across all platforms.

=== Cybercrime on application ===
Cybersex trafficking had occurred on Skype and other videoconferencing applications. According to the Australian Federal Police, overseas pedophiles were directing child sex abuse using its live streaming services.

=== Service in the People's Republic of China ===
Since September 2007, users in China trying to download the Skype software client had been redirected to the site of TOM Online, a joint venture between a Chinese wireless operator and Skype, from which a modified Chinese version could be downloaded. The TOM client participated in China's system of Internet censorship, monitoring text messages between Skype users in China as well as messages exchanged with users outside the country. Niklas Zennström, then chief executive of Skype, told reporters that TOM "had implemented a text filter, which is what everyone else in that market is doing. Those are the regulations." He also stated, "One thing that's certain is that those things are in no way jeopardising the privacy or the security of any of the users."

In October 2008, it was reported that TOM had been saving the full message contents of some Skype text conversations on its servers, apparently focusing on conversations containing political issues such as Tibet, Falun Gong, Taiwan independence, and the Chinese Communist Party. The saved messages contain personally identifiable information about the message senders and recipients, including IP addresses, usernames, landline phone numbers, and the entire content of the text messages, including the time and date of each message. Information about Skype users outside China who were communicating with a TOM-Skype user was also saved. A server misconfiguration made these log files accessible to the public for a time.

Research on the TOM-Skype venture has revealed information about blacklisted keyword checks, allowing censorship and surveillance of its users. The partnership had received much criticism for the latter. Microsoft remained unavailable for comment on the issue.

According to reports from the advocacy group Great Fire, Microsoft had modified censorship restrictions and ensured encryption of all user information. Furthermore, Microsoft partnered with Guangming Founder (GMF) in China.

All attempts to visit the official Skype web page from mainland China redirected the user to skype.gmw.cn. The Linux version of Skype was unavailable.

== Localization ==
Skype came bundled with the following locales and languages: Arabic, Bulgarian, Catalan, Chinese (Traditional and Simplified), Croatian, Czech, Danish, Dutch, English, Estonian, Finnish, French, German, Greek, Hebrew, Hungarian, Indonesian, Italian, Japanese, Korean, Latvian, Lithuanian, Nepali, Norwegian, Polish, Portuguese (Brazilian and European), Romanian, Russian, Serbian, Slovak, Slovenian, Spanish, Swedish, Thai, Turkish, Ukrainian, and Vietnamese.

As the Windows desktop program offered users the option of creating new language files, at least 80 other (full or partial) localizations were also available for many languages.

== Customer service ==
In January 2010, Skype rescinded its policy of seizing funds in Skype accounts that have been inactive (no paid call) for 180 days. This was in settlement of a class-action lawsuit. The company also paid up to US$4 to persons who opted into the action.

Skype provided support through their web support portal, support community, @skypesupport on Twitter, and Skype Facebook page. Direct contact via email and live chat was available through their web support portal. Chat Support was a premium feature available to Skype Premium and some other paid users.

Skype's refund policy stated that they would provide refunds in full if customers had used less than €1 of their Skype Credit. "Upon a duly submitted request, Skype will refund you on a pro-rata basis for the unused period of a Product."

Skype had come under some criticism from users for the inability to completely close accounts. Users not wanting to continue using Skype could make their account inactive by deleting all personal information, except for the username.

Due to an outage on 21 September 2015 that affected several users in New Zealand, Australia, and other countries, Skype decided to compensate their customers with 20 minutes of free calls to over 60 landline and 8 mobile phone destinations.

== Educational use ==
Although Skype was a commercial product, it was reported in 2011 that its non-paid version was being used with increasing frequency among teachers, schools, and charities interested in global education projects. A popular use case was to facilitate language learning through conversations that alternate between each participant's native language.

The video conferencing aspect of the software had been praised for its ability to connect students who speak different languages, facilitate virtual field trips, and engage directly with experts.

Skype in the classroom was another free-of-charge tool that Skype had set up on its website, designed to encourage teachers to make their classrooms more interactive, and collaborate with other teachers around the world. There were various Skype lessons in which students could participate. Teachers could also use a search tool and find experts in a particular field. The educational program Skype a Scientist, set up by biologist Sarah McAnulty in 2017, had in two years connected 14,312 classrooms with over 7,000 volunteer scientists.

However, Skype was not adopted universally; some educational institutions in the United States and Europe were blocking the application from their networks. During the COVID-19 pandemic and its resulting implementation of distance education policies, Skype lost much of its market share to competing platforms such as Zoom and Microsoft's own Microsoft Teams.

== See also ==
- Caller ID spoofing
- Comparison of cross-platform instant messaging clients
- Comparison of instant messaging protocols
- Comparison of VoIP software
- List of video telecommunication services and product brands
- Mobile VoIP
- Presence information
- Unified communications
