= Naviaux =

Naviaux is a surname of French origin. People with that surname include:

- Larry Naviaux (1936–2021), American football player and coach
- Robert K. Naviaux (born in 1956), American physician-scientist
- Roger Naviaux (1926–2016; active from 1973), French engineer and entomologist

== See also ==
- Naviauxella, a genus of beetles
