= Skyroads =

Skyroads may refer to:

- Skyroads (band), an electronic pop-rock band based in Tel Aviv, Israel.
- Skyroads (comics), a 1920s comic strip about aviation.
- SkyRoads (video game), a 1993 video game.
