= Singularity Hypotheses: A Scientific and Philosophical Assessment =

2013 book by Amnon H. Eden, James H. Moor, Johnny H. Soraker, and Eric Steinhart

- Hardcover edition
- Author: Amnon H. Eden, James H Moor, Johnny H. Soraker, and Eric Steinhart
- Language: English
- Publisher: Springer
- Publication date: April 3, 2013
- Publication place: United States
- Media type: Print (hardback)
- Pages: 441
- ISBN: 978-3642325595

Singularity Hypotheses: A Scientific and Philosophical Assessment is a 2013 book written by Amnon H. Eden, James H. Moor, Johnny H. Soraker, and Eric Steinhart. It focuses on conjectures about the intelligence explosion, transhumanism, and whole brain emulation.

The book features essays and commentary on the technological singularity. One version of the hypothesis explored in the book states that humans will one day make an intelligent agent that will enter runaway self-improvement cycles, with each new version appearing more rapidly, causing an intelligence explosion and resulting in an intelligence that will far surpass us.

The book's contributing authors include computational biologist Dennis Bray, artificial intelligence researcher Ben Goertzel, neuroscientist Randal A. Koene, philosophers Diane Proudfoot and David Pearce, among others.
