= Ellen Heber-Katz =

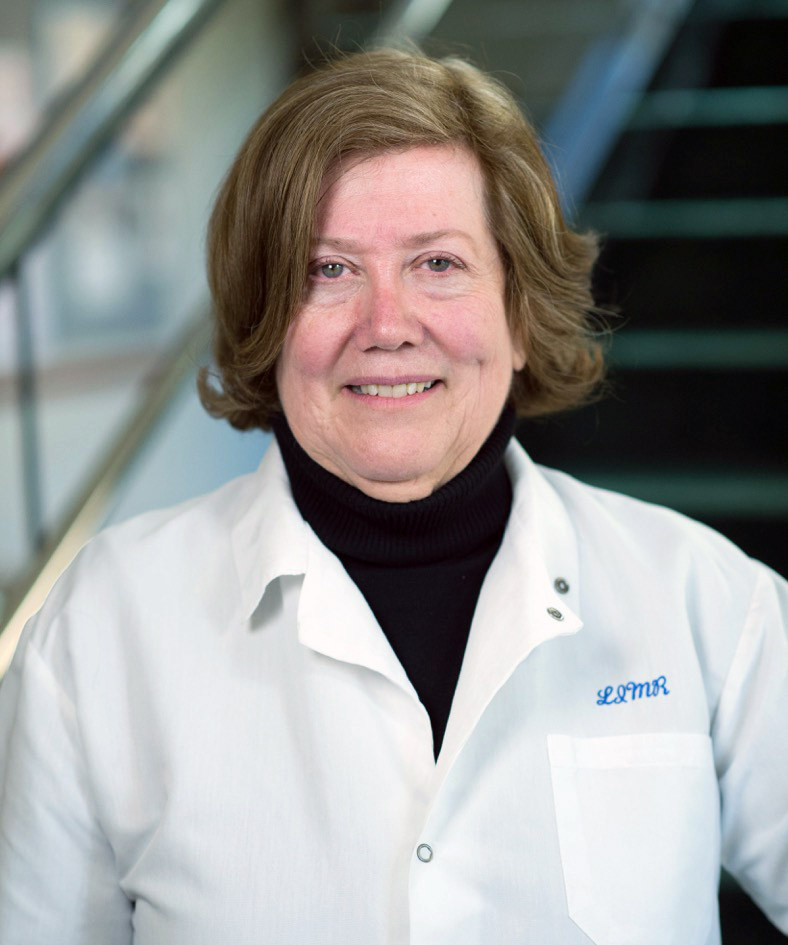
- Born: Philadelphia, Pennsylvania, U.S
- Education: University of Pennsylvania; University of Wisconsin Madison
- Scientific career
- Fields: Immunology, Microbiology
- Workplaces: Lankenau Institute for Medical Research; The Wistar Institute

Ellen Heber-Katz is an American immunologist and regeneration biologist who works as a professor at Lankenau Institute for Medical Research (LIMR). She discovered that the Murphy Roths Large (MRL) mouse strain can regenerate wounds without scarring and fully restore damaged tissue. Her research focuses on immunology, regenerative medicine, and cancer. In July 2015, she expanded her research to include studies funded by the National Cancer Institute (NCI) that investigate novel aspects of breast cancer causation.

== Education and career ==
Heber-Katz received her B.A. in microbiology and immunology in 1969. She received her M.S. in immunology in 1972 from the University of Wisconsin-Madison while studying with Robert E. Click. Her M.S. thesis focused on the role of reducing agents as critical factors in cellular immune responses. In 1976, she earned her Ph.D. in immunology from the University of Pennsylvania, studying with D.B. Wilson.

In her thesis work, she showed that single T-cell subsets could respond to both histocompatibility antigens and environmental antigens, establishing the unity of these two branches of the immune response. She pursued postdoctoral studies at the National Institutes of Allergy and Infectious Diseases (NIAID) in the Laboratory of Immunology, under the immunologists E. Shevach, W.E. Paul, and R. Schwartz. While there, she established the first functional evidence for the formation of a molecular complex between a T-cell antigen and the MHC class Ia molecule, anticipating the crystal structure later determined for this fundamental molecular complex in T-cell biology.

At NIAID, Heber-Katz also conducted experiments that illuminated the molecular details involved in controlling interactions between T-cells and macrophages. The experiment termed the "A/5R experiment" confirmed the Determinant Selection Hypothesis, which concerned the spatial relationships between the histocompatibility I-A and I-E molecules on the surface of antigen-presenting cells, the bound antigen and the recognition structure of the T-cell receptor, contributing to the fundamental understanding of how ‘foreign’ antigens activate the adaptive immune system in mammals.

In 1976, Heber-Katz was appointed as the Assistant Professor at the Wistar Institute. In her viral studies, she developed a T-cell vaccine for the herpes virus HSV-2 that could protect subjects against lethal infection in the total absence of an antibody response. This proved for the first time that, by themselves, T-cells could protect against lethal viral infection. In her autoimmune studies, she developed the “V Region Disease Hypothesis” in showing that the same T-cell receptor in mice and rats recognized different antigens to mediate different diseases.

In 1995, during her investigations into how autoimmune disease arises, Heber-Katz discovered that two of the mouse strains she was using (MRL/LPR and MRL/MPJ) had an unusual ability to heal in a regenerative amphibian-like fashion rather than through a fibrotic response. This was shown first for ear hole closure but was extended to many organ systems such as the heart. Together with Dr. Robert K. Naviaux at the University of California at San Diego, an expert in mitochondrial physiology, Heber-Katz discovered that a key to non-scarring healing in the adult MRL mouse was activation of an embryonic metabolic pattern known as aerobic glycolysis, suggesting the types of molecules involved in this unusual healing response. In particular, hypoxia-inducible factor-1a (HIF-1a) was identified as a critical molecule, based on the discovery that blocking its activity in MRL mice was sufficient to eliminate the regenerative response.

She has investigated therapeutic strategies to activate this regenerative healing response with Phillip Messersmith, a biomaterials chemist at the University of California at Berkeley. An initial milestone was the creation of time-release hydrogel formulations of a prolyl hydroxylase inhibitor that, when delivered subdermally, confers regenerative healing to a normal mouse. She has obtained evidence of regenerative healing of chronic wounds and osteoporosis in aged mice using this experimental therapeutic approach. With Dr. George Hajishengallis at the University of Pennsylvania School of Dentistry, the hydrogel drug formulation was shown to induce rapid and complete bone and soft tissue regrowth in a preclinical model of periodontal disease, characterized by tooth loss and jaw bone degeneration.
