= Laura Deming =

Venture capitalist

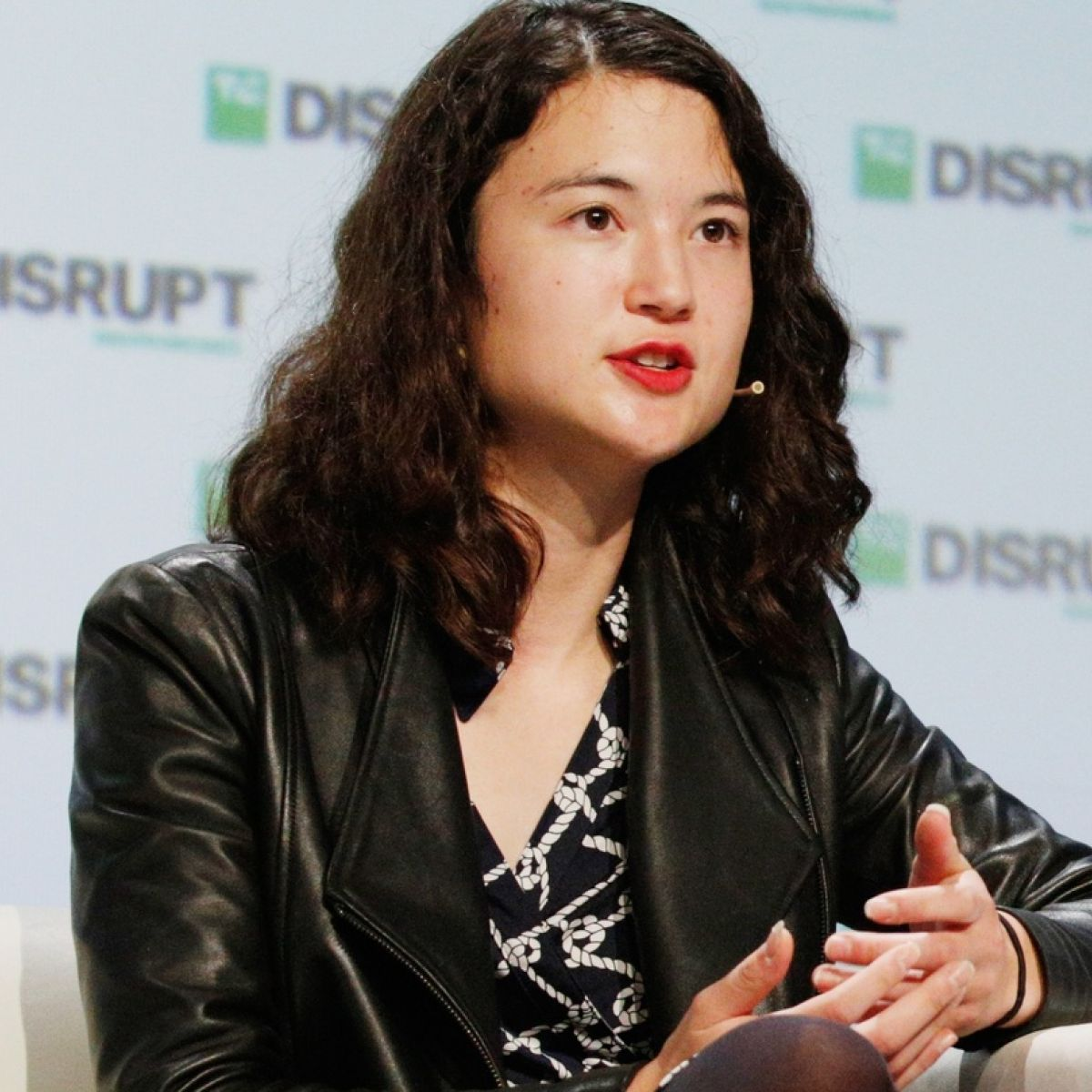
- Deming speaking at TechCrunch Disrupt SF 2018
- Born: 1994 (age 31–32)
- Education: Massachusetts Institute of Technology (dropped out)
- Awards: Thiel Fellowship; Forbes 30 Under 30
- Scientific career
- Fields: Life extension
- Workplaces: The Longevity Fund
- Academic advisors: Cynthia Kenyon

Laura Deming (born 1994) is a venture capitalist whose work focuses on life extension, and using biological research to reduce or reverse the effects of aging.

== Education ==
Laura Deming is the daughter of John and Tabitha Deming; she grew up in New Zealand. Deming and her brother, Trey, were homeschooled; she says she taught herself "calculus and probability and statistics, and French literature and history". At age 8, Deming became interested in the biology of aging, and at age 12 she joined the lab of biogerontologist Cynthia Kenyon at the University of California, San Francisco. Deming was accepted to MIT at age 14 and studied physics, but later dropped out to accept the $100,000 Thiel Fellowship and start a venture capital firm. Deming was one of only two women in the 2011 initial class of Thiel Fellows.

== Career ==
Deming is the founder of and partner at The Longevity Fund, a venture capital firm focused on aging and life extension. The firm raised $4 million in its first fund and $22 million for its second fund, in 2017. The Longevity Fund investments include Unity Biotechnology, which develops senolytic drugs targeting diseases of aging, Navitor Pharmaceuticals, and Metacrine.

In 2018, Deming launched the AGE1 accelerator, a four-month startup program aimed at supporting founders developing longevity-focused companies. The program graduated its first cohort of six on October 10, 2018, including Fauna Bio, a startup using the biology of hibernation to aid in heart attack and stroke recovery. In August 2018, Deming also began advising the newly launched Pioneer, a fund designed to find talent and "lost Einsteins" around the world, for projects in longevity.

In 2023, Deming and Alex Colville founded age1, a venture-capital firm that invests in early-stage companies conducting research related to aging and longevity. As of 2024, the firm has raised $55 million dollars.

Deming believes that science can be used to create biological immortality in humans, and has said that ending aging "is a lot closer than you might think". She has been featured in "30 Under 30" by Forbes magazine, and was featured in "The Age of Ageing", a documentary by National Geographic television channel. She also spoke at the 2012 Singularity Summit and at the 2013 TEDMED conference.

== See also ==
- Calico (company)
- SENS Research Foundation
