= SkyRoads (video game) =

1993 video game developed in Estonia

- Developer: BlueMoon Software
- Publisher: Creative Dimensions
- Programmers: Ahti Heinla; Priit Kasesalu; Jaan Tallinn
- Artist: Kaspar P. Loit
- Composers: Ott Aaloe; Hasso Brück
- Platform: MS-DOS
- Release: 1993; 33 years ago
- Genre: Platform
- Mode: Single-player

SkyRoads is a 1993 video game for MS-DOS developed by BlueMoon Software of Estonia. It is a remake of the 1990 video game Kosmonaut. It sold internationally and got low-cost retail (LCR) distribution deals from the U.S. to Taiwan.

== Gameplay ==
Gameplay screenshot

The space bar and directional keys are used to create an easy "jump and move" motion. Up accelerates the ship, while down slows down the ship. Meters at the bottom indicate the ship's current speed, oxygen level, and fuel level. The meter to the left indicates the level progress, next to a grav-o-meter that describes the planet's gravity (100 is the lowest, giving a weightless feeling, and 1700 is the highest, allowing no jumping). The level is restarted if the ship is destroyed, runs out of fuel or oxygen, or falls off the roads.

Certain colors on the roads indicate special properties upon contact:

- Dark Gray: Ship can't steer left or right and maintains prior angular momentum. (Called "Slippery" in the game)
- Dark Green: Ship decelerates quickly. (Called "Sticky" in the game)
- Light Green: Ship accelerates quickly. (Called "Boost" in the game)
- Light Red: Ship explodes. It is safe to be on the very edge of a light red square. (Called "Burning" in the game)
- Blue: Refills oxygen and fuel. Several levels have hidden blue tiles that must be reached in order to complete the level. (Called "Supplies" in the game)

The levels always end with a tunnel that ends into space, signifying a win.

== Legacy ==
Following the success of the original Skyroads, Bluemoon released a Skyroads XMAS-Special version in 1994, which featured exactly the same interface and features but different and considerably harder levels.

Bluemoon made a simple non-interactive hardware demo to be bundled for the Texas VR gear company titled Stellar Xpress, which effectively was a modern update to SkyRoads/Kosmonaut, but the project was cancelled.

Antonio Scacchetti and Massimiliano Nigro who formed Dev9k Games, were inspired by the game to create their own visual novel variation of it called “Nirvana Pilot Yume”.
