= The X-Files: Deep State =

2018 video game

- Developer: Creative Mobile
- Publisher: FoxNext
- Series: The X-Files
- Platforms: iOS, Facebook, Android
- Release: February 6, 2018
- Genre: Puzzle

The X-Files: Deep State is a spin-off mystery investigation game set in The X-Files universe. It was developed by independent Estonian studio Creative Mobile in collaboration with FoxNext Games and released worldwide on February 6, 2018 for iOS, Android and Facebook.

The game combines traditional hidden object mechanics with interactive narrative presented through branching dialogue and instances of moral choice that impact the story.

On the 20th of March in 2019, Disney successfully completed the acquisition of 21st Century Fox, in which Disney acquired most of Fox's parent company. Disney gained the rights to many of 21st Century Fox's properties, including The X-Files. On the 25th of March in 2019, the developers of The X-Files: Deep State released a tweet stating that the development of the game was currently on hold until further notice. Since then, the game has been removed from Android and iOS app stores, and the developers have removed the game from their website. Development of The X-Files: Deep State was never officially cancelled; however, the game is no longer playable, and no one appears to be working on the project.

== Gameplay ==
A screenshot from The X-Files: Deep State. Players search for hidden objects and clues in thematic scenes.

Players assume the role of a rookie FBI agent. They can customize their gender, race, physical appearance and name, or choose the default character, a female agent named Casey Winter. With the help of Winter's partner, Agent Garret Dale, they investigate paranormal cases, which in tradition of the show can either involve a self-contained "monster-of-the-week" investigation or be a part of larger overarching story of alien conspiracy.

The investigations consist of hidden object puzzles, interactive dialogues and various forensic mini-games. At the end of each case the player is presented with a moral quandary and has to make a choice which will impact the story. Different decisions they made during the investigation are also tallied and then exhibited in the "Case Report" section of the investigation, with statistics showing what percentage of players made similar choices. Some decisions also affect the player's alignment, which ranges from "Believer" to "Skeptic" and influences how Winter is perceived by other characters.

The game is free-to-play and utilizes the freemium model of monetization. Players can spend real money to buy "energy", which is required to progress through the investigation, or "cash" to acquire customization items for their character.

== Story ==
The events of The X-Files: Deep State occur between seasons 9 and 10 of The X-Files series and follow two FBI agents, Casey Winter and Garret Dale, as they investigate paranormal cases and uncover a sinister conspiracy.

=== Season 1 ===
Prologue: The Monster. In spring 2010, FBI agents Winter and Dale are sent to investigate the murder of District Attorney Karen Cooper. Despite all the evidence pointing at the victim's husband, Mark Cooper, Winter starts to suspect that he is covering for the real killer.

Case 1: Trust no 1. After a schizophrenic old physicist is accused of a gruesome double murder, Winter and Dale embark on an investigation that leads all the way to the White House.

Case 2: In Corpore Sano. Winter and Dale get transferred to the X-Files unit. Their new case leads them to Lexington, Kentucky, where a series of mysterious deaths has taken place. They discover that these deaths were caused by a deadly virus and race to find a cure before it turns into a pandemic.

Case 3: The Leper King. Trying to help a senator who is being blackmailed by a hacker, Winter and Dale cross paths with a cyber-terrorist known as the King. A simple case of blackmail suddenly takes a sinister turn.

Case 4: Lights from Above. After a famous performance artist is killed by a flying saucer at a desert art festival, Winter and Dale are dispatched to the desert to find out what really happened. The truth might be more weird than they suspect.

Case 5: Devil Ex Machina. Five scientists and two FBI agents are trapped in an underground laboratory. There's a trans-dimensional demonic parasite hiding in one of them, and it can't be allowed to escape.

Case 6: Water Gate. Desperate to save her partner, Winter gets to the bottom of the conspiracy - only to discover that reality is very different, and far more frightening, than she suspected.

=== Season 2 ===
Case 7: Derailed. Agent Winter is continuing her work in the FBI and start an investigation of a train accident in state Montana on the possibility of a terrorist act, but the case took an unexpected turn of events. The investigation of this case was joined by chief Bowman.

Case 8: The Island.

== Development ==
According to an article written by the developer for VentureBeat, their intention during the game's development was to recreate the feel of the original X-Files by analyzing how societal fears had changed in the 25 years since the show premiered, and adjust the formula accordingly. After some consideration, they decided to concentrate on the themes of "technological advancement and the use of technology to manipulate and form public opinion, and also the relationship between power, legality, and truth", exploring them in a what-if hyperbolic manner. However, during the development process (which started in the early 2016) many of the stories they intended to tell not only became too plausible to be fun, but actually came true.

== Critical reception ==
The game received mixed reviews, with some publications praising it for the quality of narrative and faithfulness to the source material, but criticizing its freemium nature and pricing strategy.

As of May 14, 2018, the game has a score of 59/100 at the Metacritic review aggregate.

The X-Files: Deep State was nominated for the 14th IMGA award in the "People's Choice" category.
