= MetaMed =

2012–2015 American medical consulting firm

MetaMed Research Inc.
- Type: Private
- Industry: Medical consulting
- Founded: 2012
- Founder: Jaan Tallinn; Zvi Mowshowitz; Michael Vassar; Nevin Freeman
- Defunct: 2015
- Headquarters: New York, New York, United States
- Area served: Worldwide
- Services: Personalized medical research
- Website: www.metamed.com

MetaMed Research was an American medical consulting firm that provided personalized medical research services. Its reports offered second opinions based on reviews of clients' medical records and published research. It was founded in 2012 by Michael Vassar (previously of the Singularity Institute), Jaan Tallinn (co-founder of Skype and Kazaa), Zvi Mowshowitz, and Nevin Freeman with startup funding from Silicon Valley investor Peter Thiel. The service was publicly launched in March 2013. MetaMed stated that its researchers were drawn from top universities, as well as prominent technology companies such as Google. Many of its principals were associated with the rationalist movement.

== Concept ==
Vassar founded MetaMed to apply the principles of rationality as taught by Eliezer Yudkowsky to medicine, having left Yudkowsky's Singularity Institute to do so. MetaMed was intended to supplement typical healthcare by providing more detailed research. Writing in January 2015, journalist Sam Frank described the company in Harper's Magazine:

Vassar had left to found MetaMed, a personalized-medicine company, with Jaan Tallinn of Skype and Kazaa, $500,000 from Peter Thiel, and a staff that included young rationalists who had cut their teeth arguing on Yudkowsky’s website. The idea behind MetaMed was to apply rationality to medicine — "rationality" here defined as the ability to properly research, weight, and synthesize the flawed medical information that exists in the world. Prices ranged from $25,000 for a literature review to a few hundred thousand for a personalized study. "We can save lots and lots and lots of lives," Vassar said (if mostly moneyed ones at first). "But it’s the signal — it's the 'Hey! Reason works!' — that matters. ... It's not really about medicine." Our whole society was sick — root, branch, and memeplex — and rationality was the only cure.

== Services ==
Its research teams included physicians, medical specialists, data scientists and librarians.

Company researchers gathered detailed medical information on each client, using this as the basis for the creation of personalized research reports for various conditions (or, in some cases, for the purpose of client performance enhancement). Its service descriptions also listed assessments of diagnostic tests, including their predictive value, and models of links among medical conditions. Vassar's longer-term aim was to aid doctors with advanced artificial intelligence and data from information experts.

MetaMed's personalized medical research services were targeted at the market for concierge medicine, with prices ranging from a few thousand dollars to hundreds of thousands.

The service was generally not covered by insurance.

== Closure ==
By April 2015, MetaMed was defunct. Tallinn said that it had not handled enough cases to learn from experience and improve its performance, preventing its planned feedback loop from developing.
