= Murphy Roths large =

Murphy Roths large (MRL/MpJ) is a strain of laboratory mouse developed in 1999 at The Wistar Institute in Philadelphia, Pennsylvania. Originally bred for autoimmune disease research, it was discovered to have remarkable tissue regeneration abilities.

== Research ==
The MRL/MpJ mouse strain was selectively bred by scientists to have an autoimmune genetic disorder (retained through inbreeding) to be used as a model for autoimmune disease research. After making puncture wounds in their ears, these mice were observed to completely regenerate from these wounds without development of scar tissue. In further research, this mouse strain has been observed to have the ability to also regenerate cardiac tissue, displays a resistance to muscle dystrophy, and is resistant to experiencing hyperglycemia from a diet high in fats.

== Regenerative medicine applications ==
The MRL/MpJ mouse has attracted considerable attention in the field of regenerative medicine owing to its remarkable capacity for tissue repair in the absence of fibrosis. Insights derived from this model have been investigated for their potential translational relevance to human therapies.

One major area of interest is scarless wound healing. The ability of MRL/MpJ mice to regenerate injured tissues without forming scar tissue provides a valuable model for elucidating mechanisms that may help reduce fibrosis in human cutaneous injuries and post-surgical healing.

Cardiac regeneration represents another promising avenue. Experimental studies have demonstrated that MRL/MpJ mice are capable of partial myocardial regeneration following injury, suggesting potential strategies for promoting cardiac repair after myocardial infarction.

Furthermore, this strain has been employed to investigate mechanisms underlying skeletal muscle repair. Its relative resistance to muscular degeneration has provided insights into potential therapeutic approaches for neuromuscular disorders, including muscular dystrophy.

In addition, studies of the MRL/MpJ model have contributed to understanding the role of metabolic regulation in tissue repair. Notably, resistance to diet-induced hyperglycemia in this strain may offer insights into improving wound healing in diabetic conditions.

Despite these promising findings, translation into clinical applications in humans remains limited, and further research is required to evaluate the safety, efficacy, and feasibility of therapeutic strategies inspired by this model.
