= Skype a Scientist =

Science videoconferencing education program

- Founded: 2017
- Founder: Sarah McAnulty
- Purpose: Nonformal learning
- Region served: International, through the Internet
- Key people: Sarah McAnulty, Executive Director
- Staff: 3
- Volunteers: 1,000+
- Website: www.skypeascientist.com

Skype a Scientist is a nonprofit educational organization based in Philadelphia, Pennsylvania, that enables scientists to video conference with students in classrooms. It began as an informal program in 2017, founded by Sarah McAnulty while she was a graduate student at the University of Connecticut. As of 2019, almost 15,000 classrooms and over 7,000 scientists from a total of 43 countries had participated in video conferencing sessions.

== History ==
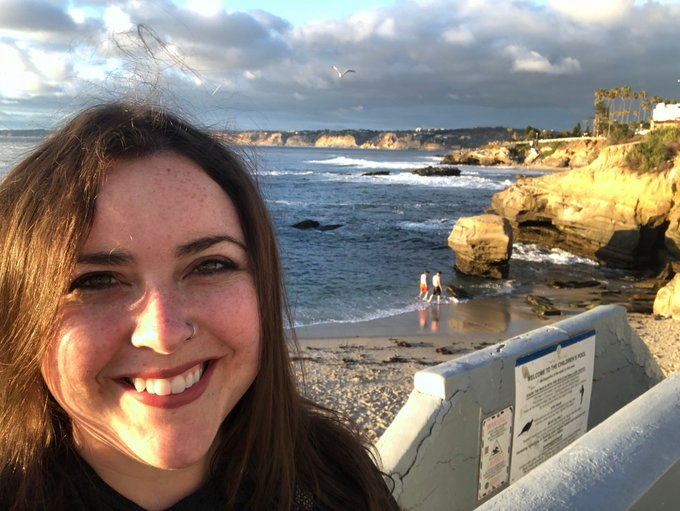
Sarah McAnulty

Sarah McAnulty came up with the idea for Skype a Scientist in 2016 while she was a graduate student in molecular and cell biology at the University of Connecticut in Storrs. Inspiration for the program came from the growing distrust of scientists and the rise of anti-intellectualism in US society. McAnulty was concerned that scientists were portrayed in media as "cold and calculating" and aimed to connect people with scientists through video conferencing to dispel those stereotypes, and to "get people trusting scientists again".

In 2017, McAnulty matched volunteer scientists with teachers and classrooms by hand using a Google spreadsheet, which she shared repeatedly on Twitter and Tumblr. She collected information from scientists and teachers and matched them based on their time zones and type of scientist requested if available. (Note: McAnulty described this process as "the biggest sudoku puzzle of [her] life.") As the program grew, McAnulty recruited her childhood friend, David Jenkins, a graduate student in bioinformatics at Boston University, to write an algorithm that could match scientists with classrooms automatically.

As of 2020, Skype a Scientist is a registered 501(c)(3) non-profit, registered as part of Sarah Mack Scicomm, Inc.

== Video conferencing programs ==
Skype a Scientist's primary project is to provide classrooms of students a video conference with a scientist. Instead of a lecture, the video calls are informal question and answer sessions that last between 30 minutes and 1 hour. Skype a Scientist hopes that this allows students to "meet" scientists, and have their questions answered.

During the first half of 2017, 800 scientists were matched with K-12 classrooms in almost all US states and in 27 other countries. By July 2017, 1,740 classrooms had signed up to be matched during the following academic term. At the same time, 1,755 scientists had volunteered from all 50 US states and 17 other countries across 12 time zones. By February 2019, a total of 14,312 classrooms had been matched with over 7,000 scientists. Participants were from 43 countries and sessions occurred in 14 languages, including American Sign Language.

In 2018, scientists were placed into 28 categories based on their discipline, such as marine biology or computer science. Skype a Scientist also tries to pair students of minority groups with scientists that share the same identity. In 2018, McAnulty stated that sessions are free to schools.

Because some classrooms with poor connections could not access video conferencing tools, Skype a Scientist began a program called "Skype a Scientist Live", where sessions are held over YouTube's live streaming feature. Questions are submitted beforehand and during the stream, and sessions are recorded for later playback. By 2019, video conferencing sessions had expanded beyond schools to correctional facilities and book clubs.

== Other programs ==
"Drunk Scientist Trivia" nights were held at bars in Connecticut, where people could participate in hands-on science activities such as looking through microscopes. Currently, "After Hours Trivia" events are hosted in a virtual space. Additionally, "Skype a Scientist After Hours" allows adults that support the organization through Patreon to converse with scientists.

Skype a Scientist works with artists to sponsor public, science-themed art initiatives. In the Fishtown neighborhood of Philadelphia, local artist Sean Martorana joined Dr. McAnulty and other partners in creating a mural completed in May 2023 depicting the aquatic life in the Delaware River.

Skype a Scientist is funded through direct donations and the subscription service Patreon.
