= Sarah McAnulty =

American squid biologist and science communicator

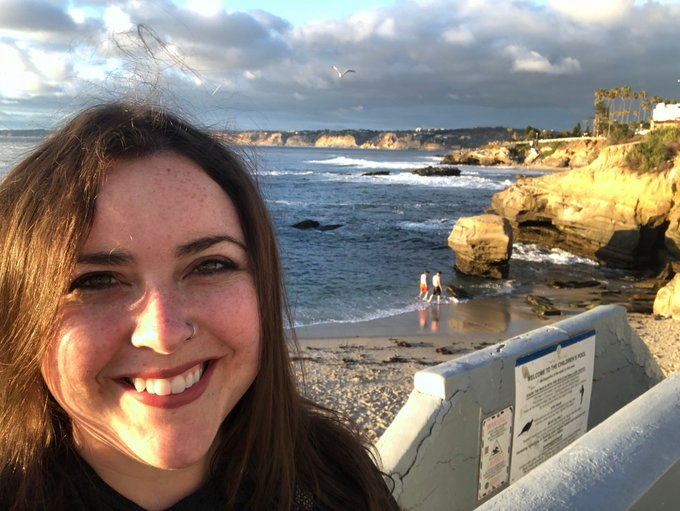
- McAnulty in 2017
- Education: Boston University (BS); University of Connecticut (PhD)
- Known for: Founding Skype a Scientist

Sarah McAnulty is an American squid biologist, artist, and science communicator working to democratize access to science and discovery. She is the founder of Skype a Scientist, a non-profit organization that connects scientists and teachers around the world for live video calls.

== Education ==
McAnulty earned a bachelor's degree in marine science at Boston University in 2011. In 2019, McAnulty was awarded a PhD from the Department of Molecular and Cell Biology at the University of Connecticut. Her graduate work focused on immunology in cephalopods, especially Hawaiian bobtail squid.

== Career ==
McAnulty founded Skype a Scientist in 2017 as a way to increase trust in scientists and improve science literacy.

McAnulty published a squid coloring book in 2018.

In 2019, McAnulty went on a road trip in the southeastern US that she dubbed the "Squids Across America Tour," where she spoke about cephalopods and science communication. She has also led trips for Atlas Obscura in Hawaii.

After graduating from UConn in 2019, McAnulty became a Research Assistant Professor in the same department. She also continued as executive director of Skype a Scientist, a position she still holds.

McAnulty is an advocate for widespread access to science and conservation in her local community, spearheading mural projects and street art to spark everyday curiosity about Philadelphia wildlife. She also uses street art and her own car, the Squidmobile, to promote the Squid Facts Hotline, a service that delivers facts about squid via text message. She has organized mural paintings in the Fishtown and Kensington neighborhoods featuring local wildlife.

McAnulty was the 2023 recipient of the American Society for Cell Biology Public Service Award, given to honor national leadership and outstanding public service in support of biomedical research or advocacy of sound research policies.
