= Robert K. Naviaux =

American scientist

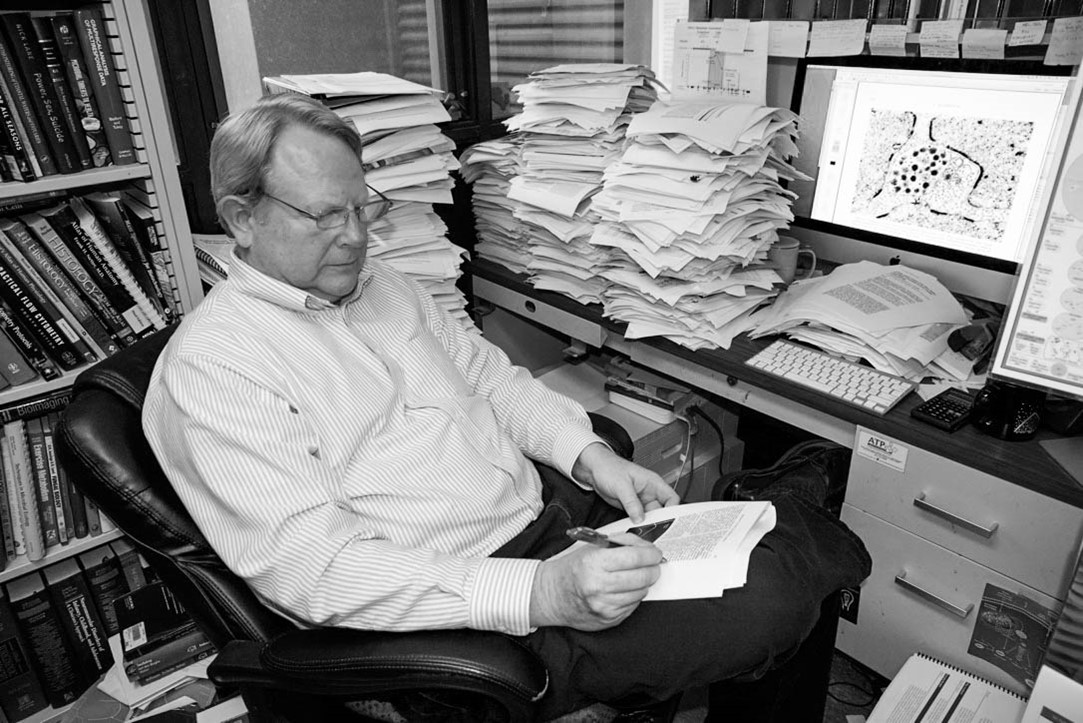
- Born: Robert Keith Naviaux; June 27, 1956; Woodland, California, U.S.
- Education: Georg August University, Göttingen, Germany (undergraduate biochemistry) University of California, Davis (BS) Indiana University (MA, MD, PhD; human genetics and virology)
- Known for: Discovery of the cause of Alpers syndrome, Metabolic features of the cell danger response (CDR), Mitochondrial and metabolic features and stages of the healing cycle (salugenesis), Hyperpurinergia hypothesis for the genesis and treatment of autism
- Spouse: Jane Crowley Naviaux (m. 1987)
- Children: 2
- Awards: Inaugural Kelsey Wright Award, UMDF (2001) Autism trailblazer award, Autism Speaks (2011) Lifetime achievement award, MMS (2018) Pioneering achievement award, ISEAI (2019) The Vanguard Award, UMDF (2023)
- Scientific career
- Fields: Mitochondrial medicine, molecular and medical genetics, biochemical genetics, inborn errors of metabolism, metabolomics, virology, immunology, ecosystem biology, environmental medicine
- Workplaces: UC San Diego
- Thesis: Construction and characterization of three infectious molecular clones of encephalomyocarditis virus (1989)
- Doctoral advisor: W. Dean Fraser, Milton W. Taylor, M. Ed Hodes, Joe C. Christian, George W. Jordan, Stuart H. Cohen
- Website: https://naviauxlab.ucsd.edu

Robert K. Naviaux (born in 1956) is an American physician-scientist who specializes in mitochondrial medicine and complex chronic disorders. He discovered the cause of Alpers syndrome, and was part of the team that reported the first mitochondrial DNA (mtDNA) mutation to cause genetic forms of autism. Naviaux proposed the cell danger response (CDR) and hyperpurinergia hypothesis for complex disorders in 2014 and directed the first FDA-approved clinical trial to study the safety and efficacy of the antipurinergic drug suramin as a new treatment for autism spectrum disorder (ASD).

Naviaux is the founder and co-director of the Mitochondrial and Metabolic Disease Center (MMDC) at UCSD and is a Professor of Genetics in the departments of Medicine, Pediatrics, and Pathology at the UCSD School of Medicine, where he directs a core laboratory for metabolomics. He is the co-founder and a former president of the Mitochondrial Medicine Society (MMS) and a founding associate editor of the journal Mitochondrion. Naviaux received the 2023 United Mitochondrial Disease Foundation Vanguard Award.

== Training ==
Naviaux received his B.S. in biological sciences from the University of California Davis. He studied natural killer cell biology and cancer immunology as an undergraduate research intern at the National Institutes of Health (NIH) and studied biochemistry and medical sociology at Georg August University in Göttingen, Germany as an education abroad student. In 1981, he earned a master's in zoology and microbiology from Indiana University in Bloomington, Indiana. He was trained in the medical scientist training program (MSTP) at Indiana University and received his MD and PhD in medical genetics and virology in 1989. He was a resident and medical scholar in the clinical investigator pathway of the American Board of Internal Medicine (ABIM) at UC Davis Medical Center from 1986 to 1990. In 1990, Naviaux was named a National Medical Resident of the Year by the National Institute of Diabetes, Digestive, and Kidney Disease (NIDDK, NIH). He did his postdoctoral training in gene therapy and retrovirus biology at the Salk Institute from 1990 to 1994, where he invented the pCL retroviral gene transfer vectors. Naviaux was a Fogarty International scholar in India in 1994. He did his medical subspecialty training in pediatrics as a fellow in biochemical genetics and inborn errors of metabolism from 1994 to 1997 at the University of California, San Diego (UCSD) School of Medicine. In 1996, Naviaux founded the Mitochondrial and Metabolic Disease Center (MMDC) at UCSD.

== Research career ==
Naviaux joined the faculty of the University of California, San Diego in 1997. In 1999, he reported the cause of the classical neurogenetic disease Alpers-Huttenlocher syndrome. From 2003 to 2007, he studied the biophysical response of mitochondria to genetic and environmental stress. Studies on the role of mitochondria in regeneration and healing in the MRL mouse followed. In 2008, he developed the concept of the cell danger response (CDR) and the hyperpurinergia hypothesis that focused on abnormalities in ATP signaling as a root cause for the genesis and treatment of autism spectrum disorder (ASD). This led to a Trailblazer Award from Autism Speaks in 2011. After successful testing in several mouse models of ASD, the antipurinergic drug suramin was found to be safe and effective as a new treatment for the core symptoms of autism in a small clinical trial of 10 children in the SAT1 trial. Recent work in the Naviaux lab has showcased the connection between mitochondria, incomplete healing and aging, and the connections between environmental health, mitochondria, the cell danger response, and the rising prevalence of chronic illness.
