= CM Games =

Independent video game developer and publisher

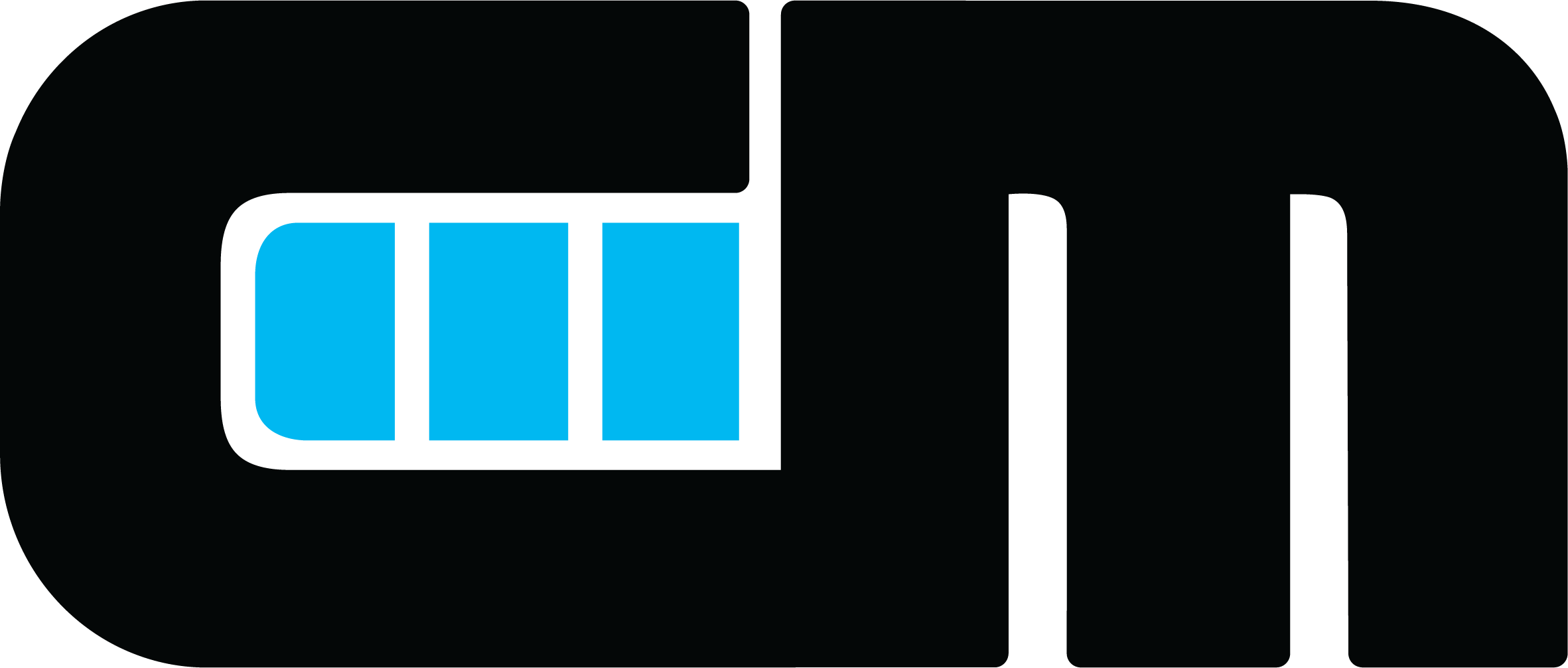
CM Games OÜ CM Games logo
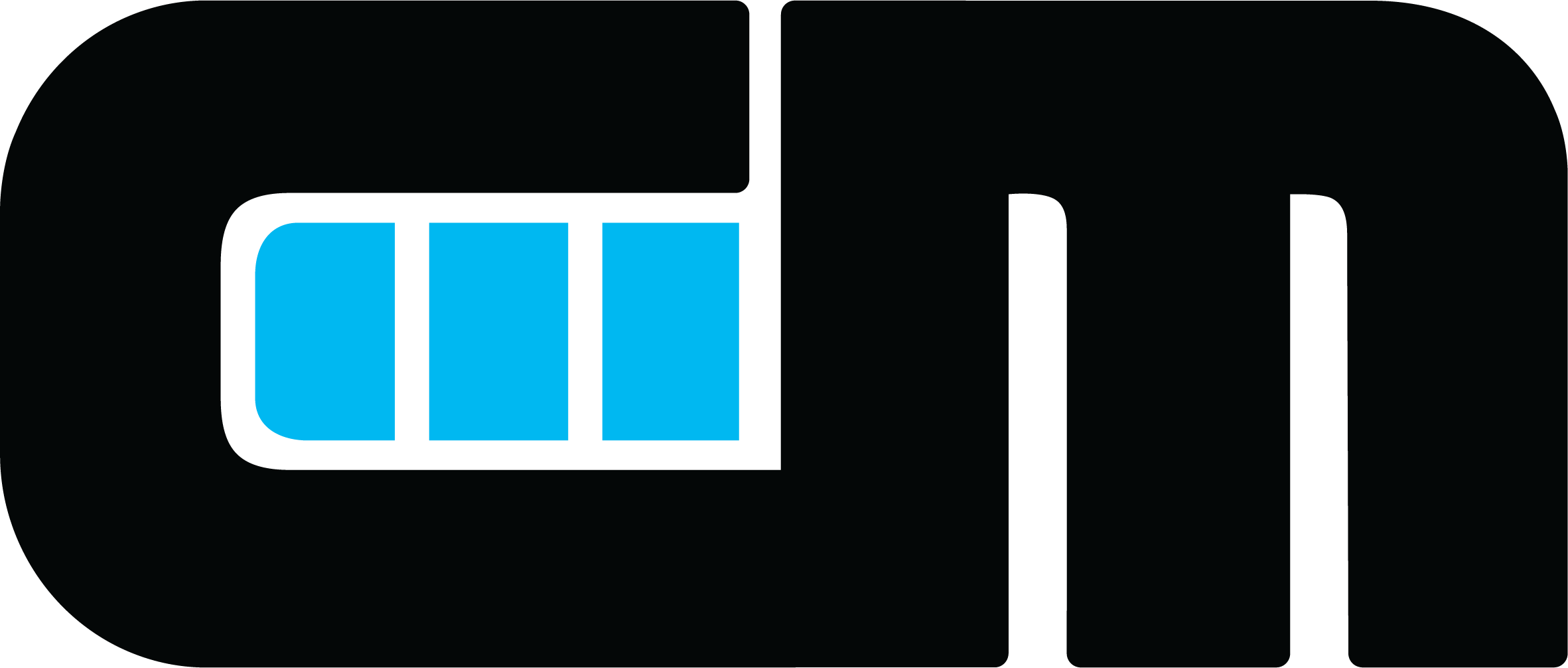
- Industry: Video games
- Founded: Tallinn, Estonia (2010)
- Headquarters: Tallinn, Estonia
- Website: www.cm.games

CM Games is an Estonian independent video game developer and publisher based in Tallinn, Estonia.

Creative Mobile was founded in 2010 by 3 colleagues interested in making games for the Android market. The company quickly evolved into a game studio, consistently topping the Android and IOS game charts. Creative Mobile has never raised any funds and is still owned by the original founders.

In 2012 Creative Mobile was named 'Startup of the Year' in Estonia and a PocketGamer Top 50 Developer in 2013, 2014 and 2015. In 2014 Creative Mobile celebrated 200 million game installs on the Android platform.

Creative Mobile is an investor of Gamefounders, a gaming accelerator based in Tallinn, Estonia They also are an organizer of the GameDev Days Conference in cooperation with IGDA Estonia and the European Union European Regional Development Fund.

== Games developed and published ==
CM Games is best known for the Drag Racing and Nitro Nation game franchises.

Drag Racing was listed by The New York Times as one of the 'Best Android Gaming Apps of 2011', a 2012 Webby Award honoree in the category of Mobile Sites & Apps Games and is one of the most downloaded games on Google Play with over 100 million players worldwide. In 2015 Nitro Nation Stories was awarded 'Best Mobile Game' at the DevGamm conference in Hamburg. On April 26, 2016, it was announced that Creative Mobile and Moor Games were collaborating to release a mobile racing game featuring rapper Fetty Wap. The game is offshoot of mobile game Nitro Nation Stories.

Year	Title	Platform(s)
2010	Basketball Shots 3D	Android
2010	Overkill: Space Shooter	Android
2011	Alchemy~Genetics	Android
2011	Drag Racing	Android, IOS
2011	Bad Blood	Android
2012	Drag Racing: Bike Edition	Android, IOS
2012	Digger HD	Android
2012	Pocket Dragons	Android
2012	Clash of the Damned (Published)	Android
2013
2013	Drag Racing	Java ME
2013	Drag Racing 4x4	Android
2013	Clash of the Damned (Published)	Android, IOS
2013	Mushroom Wars (Published)	Android
2013	War of Tanks (Published)	Android
2013	Basketball Shots 3D (Published)	IOS
2014
2014	Nitro Nation Online	Android
2014	Road Smash (Published)	Android
2014	Last Inua (Published)	IOS
2014	Snowboard Run (Published)	Android
2014	Zombie Harvest (Published)	Android
2014	Pinball Fantasy HD (Published)	Android
2014	War of Tanks: Clans (Published)	Android
2014	Hamster Balls (Published)	Android, Facebook
2014	Ambush! Tower Offense (Published)	Android
2015	Nitro Nation Stories	Android
2015	Nitro Nation Online	IOS, Windows Phone, Samsung
2015	Stickman Trials (Published)	Android, IOS
2015	Drag Racing: Club Wars	Android
2016
2016	Fetty Wap: Nitro Nation Stories	Android, IOS
2016	Pocket Tower: Skyscraper (Published)	Android, IOS
2016	Cyberline Racing (Published)	Android
2016	Trigger Time (Published)	Steam Greenlight

=== Nitro Nation Online ===
Nitro Nation Online

Aggregate scores
Aggregator	Score
GameRankings	75.07%
Metacritic	N/A

Review scores
Publication	Score
Pocket Gamer	7/10
PocketMeta	22/25

Nitro Nation Online (alternatively referred to as Nitro Nation Racing) is a racing game for Android, iOS, Windows Phone and Samsung devices. The game was first announced on September 17, 2013 as Beta preview. On April 3, 2014 the Beta was completed and a full release of Nitro Nation Online was launched on Google Play.

The game is divided into 2 areas of play, career and multiplayer. Career mode is a single player event, which unlocks game features as the game progresses. Several multiplayer modes are available.

Aggregate review website GameRankings assigned a score of 75/100 based on reviews from 2 critics.

Media reception to Nitro Nation Online has been generally positive, Pocket Gamer giving it a rating of 7/10, remarking that "It's almost dangerously simple to pick up and play, and that desire to shave seconds off your time becomes habit-forming in a few plays."

PocketMeta offered mixed criticism with a combined total score of 22/25, praising "Nitro Nation Online is a beautiful drag racing game with a vibrant online community that will make you jealous of the luxurious cars of the best of the crop on the leader boards. Very rich gallery of customization options and achievements create addictive and rewarding game play while competing against other players allows you to feel a sense of belonging to the drag racing community." and deriding "...loading times and the difficulty of upgrading without resorting to in-app purchases. Other than that, it's a must-have item on your Android tablet."

This sentiment is backed up by GameZone which giving an 8.5/10 rating, states "Fast and addictive gameplay makes for a fun gameplay experience, while the fast customization options add a layer of addiction to the game. Racing with other players and climbing the leader boards is by far the game's best aspect for me." Losing some ratings due to "Having to lose a few races every time just to gain some money to upgrade and progress further makes the game feel like a grind and this is compounded with loading times that exceed gameplay time. That being said, the game is still the most addictive and fun racing game I have played on my mobile gaming device and is sure to give players countless hours of fun."
