= Jaan Tallinn =

Estonian programmer and investor

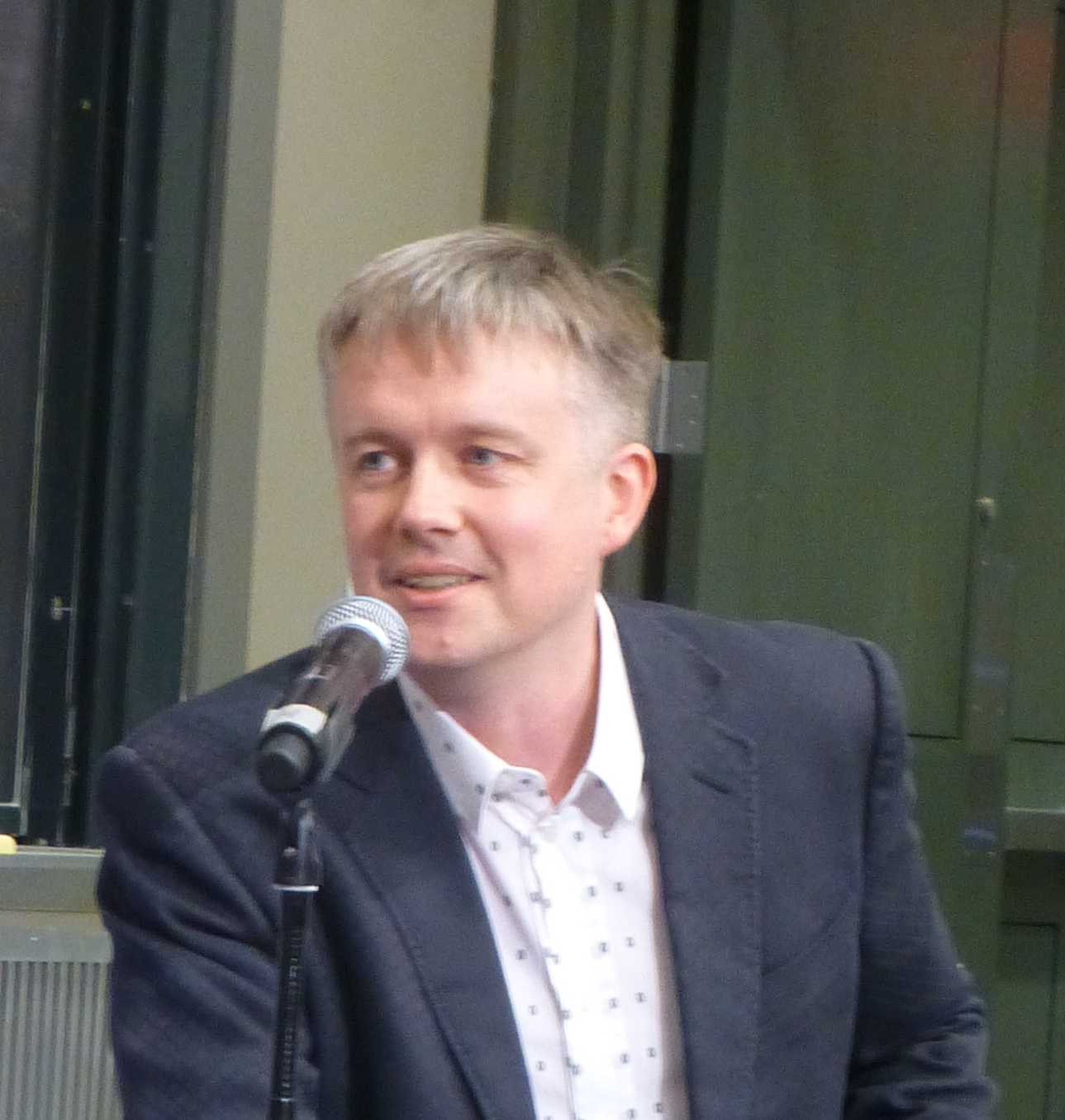
- Born: 14 February 1972 (age 54); Tallinn, Estonia
- Education: University of Tartu (BSc)
- Occupations: programmer, investor, philanthropist
- Known for: Kazaa; Skype; Existential risk

Jaan Tallinn (born 14 February 1972) is an Estonian computer programmer and investor who contributed to the telecommunications platform Skype and file-sharing application FastTrack/Kazaa.

Tallinn is involved in the field of existential risk, having co-founded both the Centre for the Study of Existential Risk (CSER) at the University of Cambridge, in the United Kingdom and the Future of Life Institute in Cambridge, Massachusetts, in the United States.

Tallinn was an early investor and board member at DeepMind (later acquired by Google); other investors included Elon Musk and Peter Thiel's Founders Fund. In 2021, Tallinn also led the initial $124 million Series A funding round for Anthropic, a frontier AI lab focused on safety and alignment. As of November 2026, Forbes estimates his net worth to be over $20 billion following the company's IPO.

== Life ==
Tallinn graduated from the University of Tartu in Estonia in 1996 with a BSc in theoretical physics with a thesis that considered travelling interstellar distances using warps in spacetime.

Tallinn founded Bluemoon in Estonia alongside schoolmates Ahti Heinla and Priit Kasesalu. Bluemoon's Kosmonaut became, in 1989 (SkyRoads is the 1993 remake), the first Estonian game to be sold abroad, and earned the company US$5,000 (~$12,987 in 2025). By 1999, Bluemoon faced bankruptcy; its founders decided to acquire remote jobs for the Swedish Tele2 at a salary of US$330 (~$638.00 in 2025) each per day. The Tele2 project, "Everyday.com", was a commercial flop. Subsequently, while working as a stay-at-home father, Tallinn developed FastTrack and Kazaa for Niklas Zennström and Janus Friis (formerly of Tele2). Kazaa's P2P technology was later repurposed to drive Skype around 2003. Tallinn sold his shares in Skype in 2005, when it was purchased by eBay.

In 2014, he invested in the reversible debugging software for app development Undo. He also made an early investment in DeepMind which was purchased by Google in 2014 for $600 million (~$803 million in 2025). Other investments include Faculty, a British AI startup focused on tracking terrorists, and Pactum, an "autonomous negotiation" startup based in California and Estonia.

According to sources cited by the Wall Street Journal and Semafor, Tallinn loaned Alameda Research, co-founded by Sam Bankman-Fried, about $100 million (~$126 million in 2025), and recalled most of the loan in 2018.

As of 2019, Tallinn was married and had six children.

== Other tenures ==
- Member of the Board of Sponsors of the Bulletin of the Atomic Scientists.
- Former member of the Estonian President's Academic Advisory Board.
- Co-founder of the personalized medical research company MetaMed.

Tallinn is a participant in and donor to the effective altruism movement. As of April 2026, the Machine Intelligence Research Institute credited him with over $1.6 million in total contributions, including matching funds leveraged. His initial donation when co-founding the Centre for the Study of Existential Risk in 2012 was around $200,000 (~$276,811 in 2025).

== Views ==
Tallinn promotes the study of existential risk and has spoken publicly on this topic. His main worries are related to artificial intelligence, unknowns coming from technological development, synthetic biology and nanotechnology. He believes humanity is not spending enough resources on long-term planning and mitigating threats that could cause human extinction. He has been a supporter of the Rationalist movement. He has also contributed to Chatham House, supporting their work on the nuclear threat.

His views on the AI alignment problem have been influenced by the writings of Eliezer Yudkowsky. Tallinn recalls that "the overall idea that caught my attention that I never had thought about was that we are seeing the end of an era during which the human brain has been the main shaper of the future". In 2023, he said he had yet to meet anyone working at AI labs who thinks the risk of training the next-generation model "blowing up the planet" is less than 1%.

When employees of OpenAI left to form Anthropic, primarily out of concerns that OpenAI was not focused enough on AI safety, Tallinn invested in the new company. However, he was unsure if he had made the right decision, arguing that "on the one hand, it’s great to have this safety-focused thing. On the other hand, this is proliferation". Tallinn praised Anthropic for having a greater safety focus than other AI companies, but said "that doesn’t change the fact that they’re dealing with dangerous stuff and I’m not sure if they should be. I’m not sure if anyone should be".

Tallinn donated $482,000 to the pronatalist Pragmatist Foundation, created by Simone and Malcolm Collins.

In March 2023, Tallinn signed an open letter from the Future of Life Institute calling for "all AI labs to immediately pause for at least 6 months the training of AI systems more powerful than GPT-4". In May 2023, he signed a statement from the Center for AI Safety which read "Mitigating the risk of extinction from AI should be a global priority alongside other societal-scale risks such as pandemics and nuclear war". He also signed the October 2025 statement from the Future of Life Institute calling for "a prohibition on the development of superintelligence, not lifted before there is broad scientific consensus that it will be done safely and controllably, and strong public buy-in".
