= Roketz =

1995 video game

- Intro screen
- Developer(s): The FARM
- Publisher(s): Exclusive PD
- Platform(s): Amiga 1200, MS-DOS
- Release: 1995: Amiga; 1996: MS-DOS
- Genre(s): Multidirectional shooter
- Mode(s): Single-player, multiplayer

Roketz is a multidirectional shooter released for the Amiga 1200 in 1995 and MS-DOS in 1996. It has gravity-based, thrust-and-turn gameplay similar to the arcade video game Gravitar, a game that also inspired the home game Thrust.

== Reception ==
Rocketz

Review scores
Publication	Score
The One Amiga	85%
Amiga User International	77%
Amiga Power	61%
