= Randal A. Koene =

Dutch neuroscientist

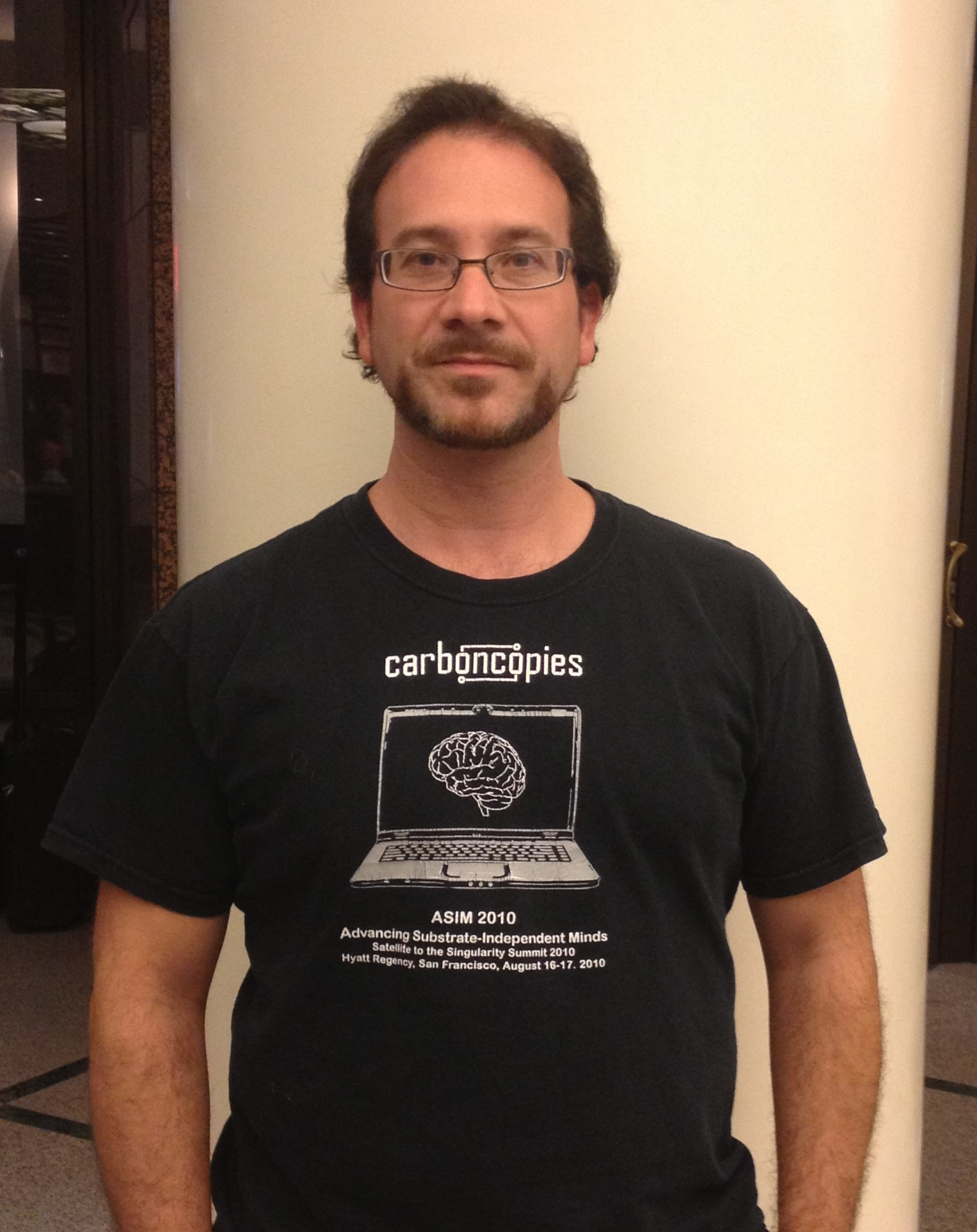
- Randal Koene in October 2014
- Education: McGill University, Delft University of Technology
- Known for: Whole brain emulation, Mind uploading
- Scientific career
- Fields: Neuroscience, Neuroengineering
- Workplaces: Tecnalia

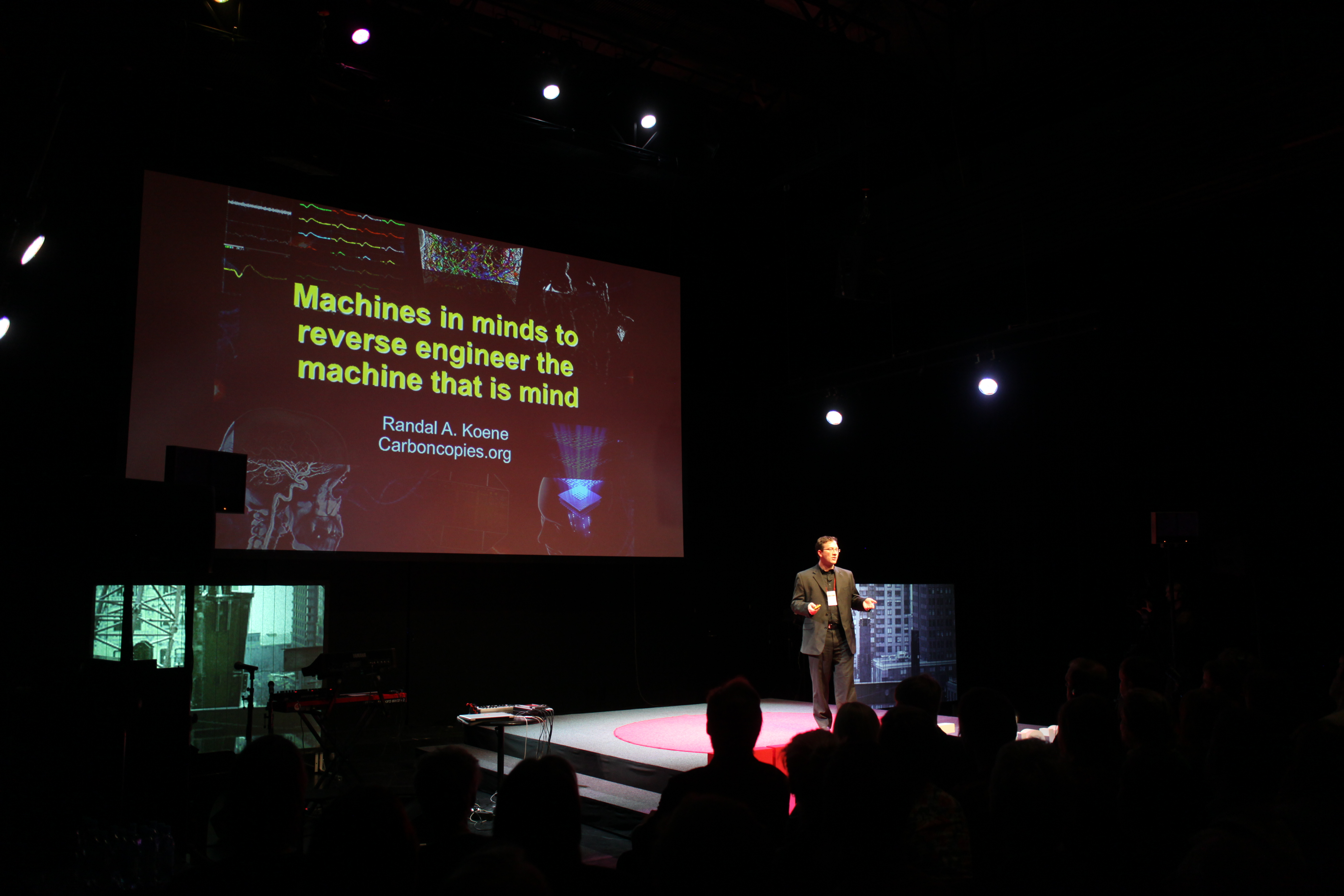
Randal A. Koene in TEDxTallinn 2012.

Randal A. Koene is a Dutch neuroscientist and neuroengineer. He co-founded carboncopies.org, an organization dedicated to researching Substrate-Independent Minds (SIM). From 2008 to 2010, Koene served as the Director of the Department of Neuroengineering at the Fatronik-Tecnalia Institute in Spain. He holds a Ph.D. in Computational Neuroscience from McGill University and an M.Sc. in Electrical Engineering with a specialization in Information Theory from Delft University of Technology.

Koene's academic career includes a tenure as a professor at Boston University Center for Memory and Brain and co-founding the Neural Engineering Corporation of Massachusetts. He also established MindUploading.org. He first proposed the term and specific approach called whole brain emulation, aimed at achieving mind transfer to a different substrate.

He contributed to the Oxford working group convened in 2007, which aimed at formulating the initial roadmap towards whole brain emulation.

Koene organizes neural engineering efforts to obtain and replicate functional and structural information from the neural substrate for use in neuroprostheses and neural interfaces. Using NETMORPH, his computational framework for simulating the morphological development of neuronal circuitry, Koene's lab is developing a Virtual Brain Laboratory.
