= Ahti Heinla =

Estonian programmer and businessman (born 1972)

- Heinla in 2026
- Born: 2 May 1972 (age 54)
- Occupations: Computer programmer, businessman
- Known for: Co-developing Skype; co-founding Starship Technologies; organising Let's Do It 2008
- Notable work: Skype

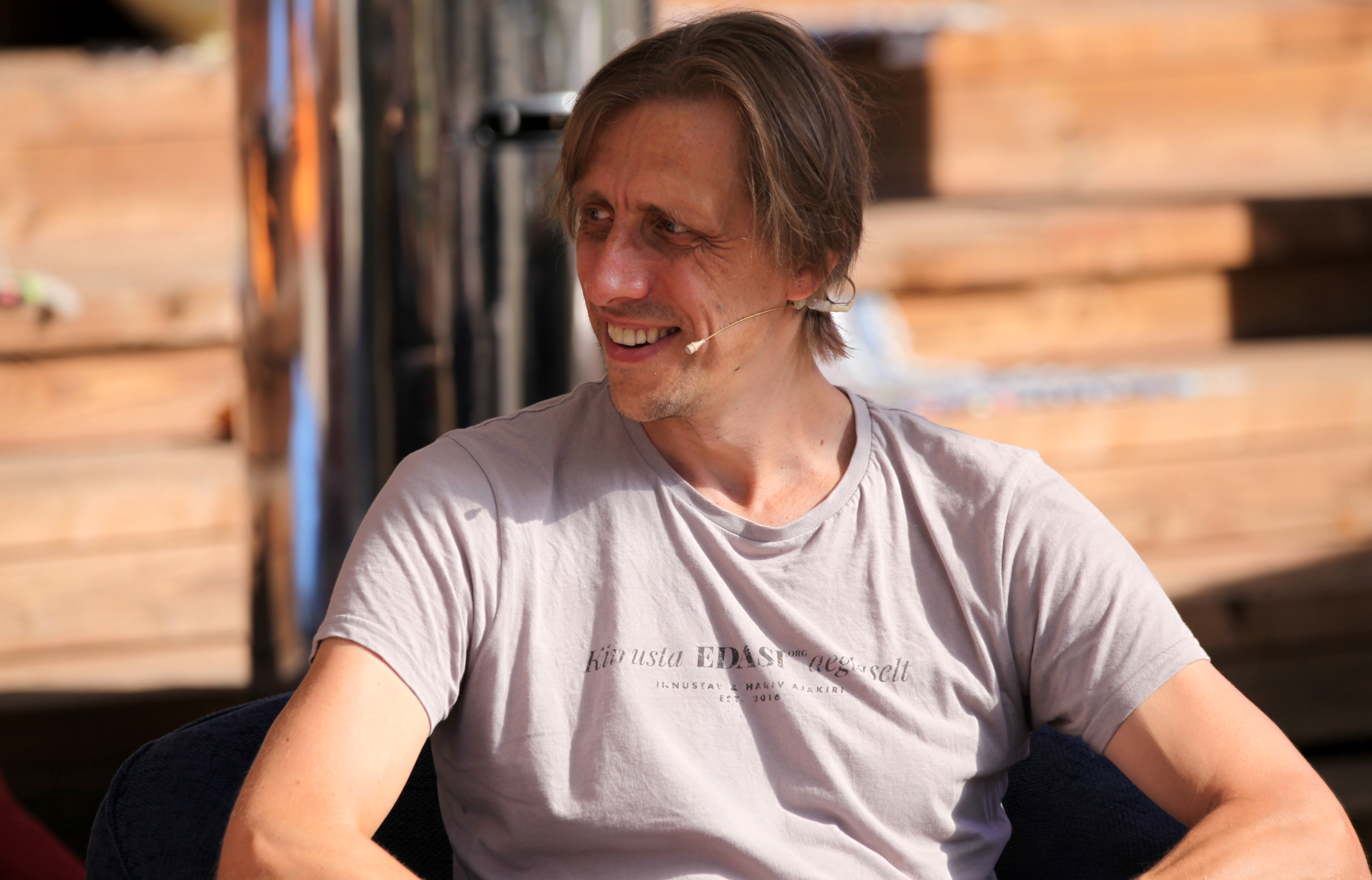
Heinla in 2022

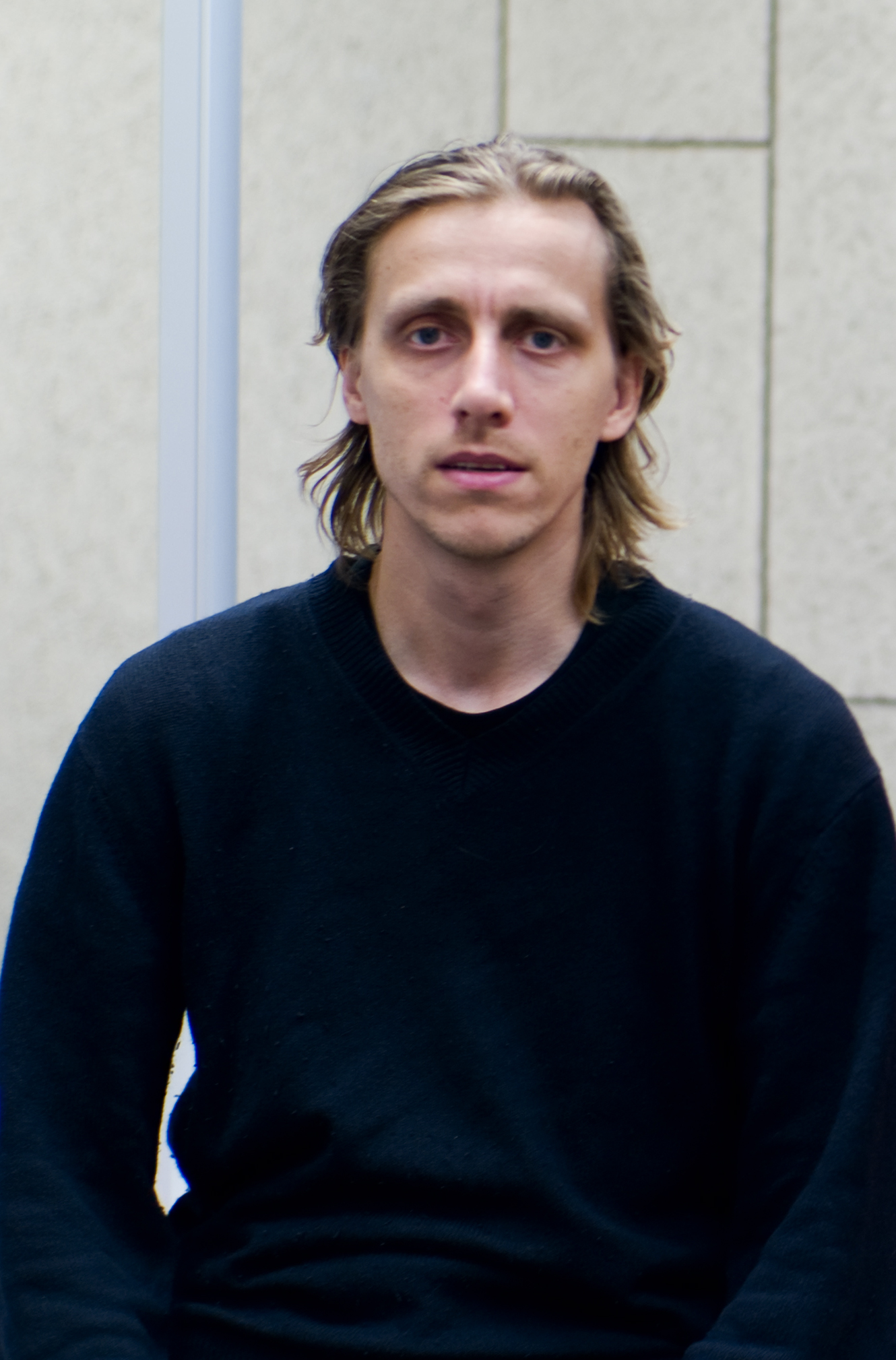
Heinla in 2007

Ahti Heinla (born 2 May 1972) is an Estonian computer programmer and businessman. He is one of the developers of Skype.

He was also an organizer of Let's Do It 2008, a civic action with 50,000 volunteers participating in cleaning up the countryside of Estonia in one day.

He was awarded the Order of the White Star, 5th class, in 2007, and is a recipient of the 2008 Estonian Volunteer of the Year national award.

He has been a member of the board at the nature protection NGO Estonian Fund for Nature since 2006.

Heinla speaks Estonian, English and Spanish.

In 2013 and 2014, he participated on NASA Centennial Challenge as team leader for Team Kuukulgur.

Heinla and Janus Friis founded Starship Technologies in 2014, to develop small self-driving delivery robots. He is the CEO and CTO.

Heinla was educated at the Gustav Adolf Gymnasium and studied physics at the University of Tartu for two years.
