= Yahoo Japan Corporation =

Japanese internet company

Yahoo! Japan Corporation

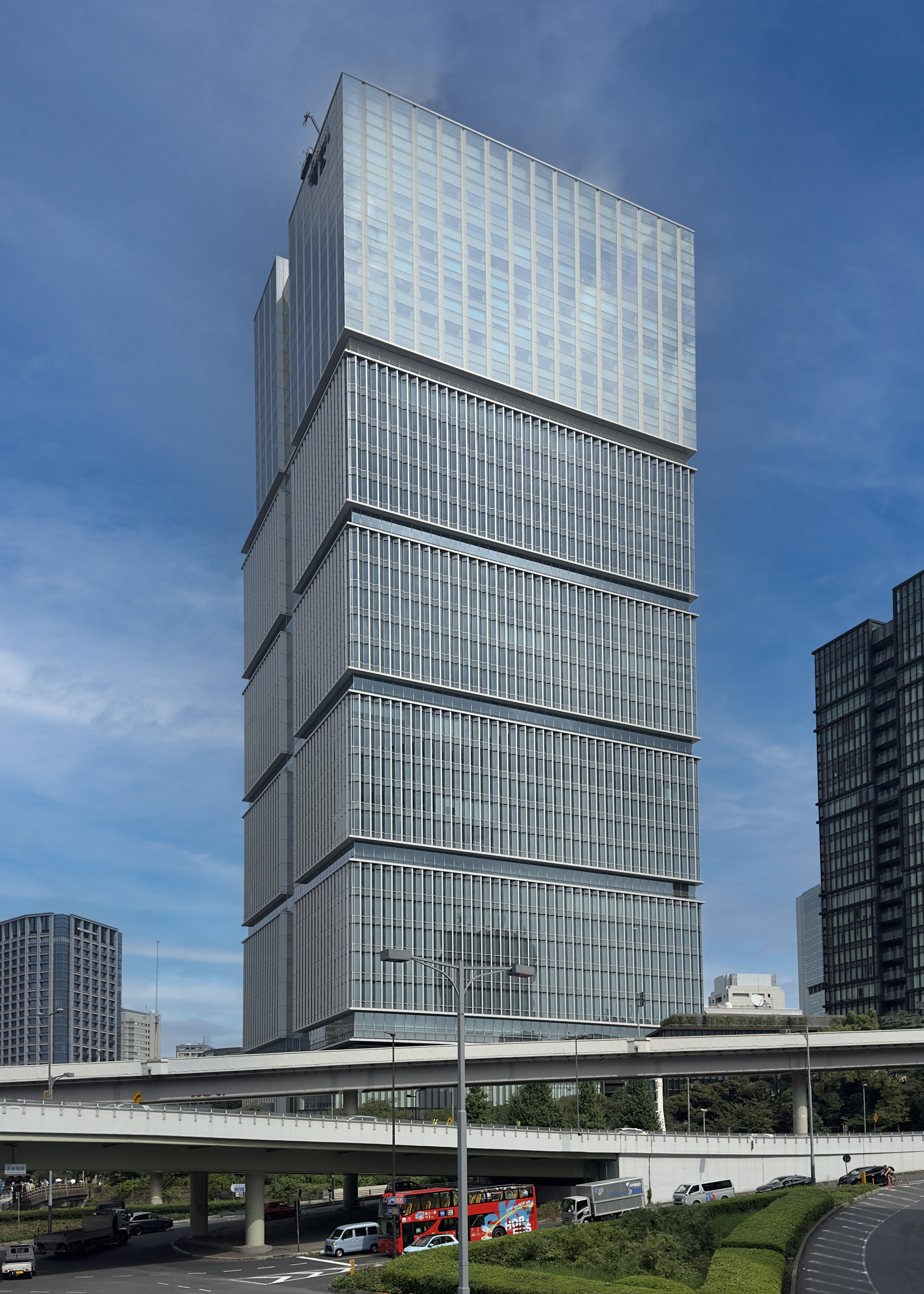
- Headquarters at Tokyo Garden Terrace Kioicho in Kioichō, Chiyoda, Tokyo
- Native name: ヤフー株式会社
- Romanized name: Yafū! kabushiki gaisha
- Type: Public KK
- Founded: January 11, 1996; 30 years ago
- Founder: SoftBank (now SoftBank Group); Yahoo! Inc.
- Defunct: October 1, 2023; 3 years ago
- Fate: Merged with Z Holdings and Line Corporation
- Successor: LY Corporation
- Headquarters: 1–3, Kioi-cho, Chiyoda-ku, Tokyo, Japan
- Number of locations: 2 (Nagoya and Osaka)
- Key people: Masayoshi Son (chairman); Manabu Miyasaka (president and CEO)
- Revenue: ▲¥292,423 million (FY 2010)
- Operating income: ▲¥159,604 million (FY 2010)
- Net income: ▲¥92,174 million (FY 2010)
- Total assets: ▲¥471,745 million (FY 2010)
- Total equity: ▲¥385,105 million (FY 2010)
- Number of employees: 5,518 (As of September 30, 2015)
- Parent: SoftBank Group (1996–2019); SoftBank Corp (2019); Z Holdings (2019–2023)
- Subsidiaries: Netrust, Ltd. ASKUL Corporation
- Website: about.yahoo.co.jp

Yahoo! Japan Corporation (ヤフー株式会社, Yafū Kabushiki-gaisha) was a Japanese web services provider. It was founded in 1996 as a joint venture between SoftBank and Yahoo! Inc. In 2019, it changed to a holding company structure and came under Z Holdings, a subsidiary of SoftBank Group. In 2021, Line Corporation also became part of ZHD, and in 2023, Yahoo! Japan merged with ZHD and its five subsidiaries, including Line Corp, to form LY Corporation. It operated Yahoo! Japan, which was the most-visited website in Japan.

== History ==
Yahoo! and SoftBank formed Yahoo! Japan in January 1996 to establish the first web portal in Japan. Yahoo! Japan went live on April 1, 1996. Yahoo! Japan was listed on JASDAQ in November 1997. In January 2000, it became the first stock in Japanese history to trade for more than ¥100 million per share. The company was listed on the Tokyo Stock Exchange in October 2003 and became part of the Nikkei 225 stock market index in 2005.

In 2017, Verizon Communications purchased the core internet business of United States-based Yahoo!, and merged it with AOL into Oath, Inc.; Yahoo! Japan was not affected. It continued as a joint venture between Softbank and what remained of Yahoo! Inc. was renamed Altaba. Yahoo! had been declining economically and in popularity since the late 2000s, but this was not the case for Yahoo! Japan, which continued to dominate Japan's internet industry. Following the sale, Yahoo! Japan continued to use the name "Yahoo!" under license from Verizon Communications. In July 2018, SoftBank bought $2 billion worth of shares in Yahoo! Japan from Altaba, increasing its stake to 48.17 percent. Yahoo! Japan, in turn, bought nearly the same amount of stock from SoftBank. In September 2018, Altaba sold all of its remaining shares in Yahoo! Japan for roughly $4.3 billion. Yahoo! Japan acquired trademark rights to the "Yahoo!" brand in Japan from Verizon in 2021.

In March 2021, Yahoo! Japan Corporation was renamed Z Holdings and merged with LINE Corporation. Under the new structure, Naver Corporation (Line's former parent company) and SoftBank Corp. (the wireless carrier unit of SoftBank Group) each hold 50 percent stakes in a new company named A Holdings Corp., which holds a majority stake in Z Holdings, which will operate Line and Yahoo! Japan. Upon integrating the two businesses and creating further platforms, the merged company aims to compete with the U.S. tech giants Google, Amazon, Facebook, and Apple and the Chinese tech giants Baidu, Alibaba, and Tencent, as well as the Japanese e-commerce giant Rakuten. The merger also gives Z Holdings three additional Asian markets where Line is popular: Taiwan, Thailand, and Indonesia.

=== Industry affiliations ===
Yahoo! Japan was a founding member of the Japan Association of New Economy (JANE, at the time named Japan e-business association), a Japanese e-business association led by Rakuten CEO Hiroshi Mikitani, in February 2010; Rakuten later withdrew from the Japan Business Federation (Keidanren) in June 2011 and made moves to make JANE become a rival to Keidanren. Yahoo! Japan withdrew from JANE in March 2012 and joined Keidanren in July 2012.

== See also ==
- Yahoo! Japan
- LY Corporation
