= LY Corporation =

Japanese internet company

- Logo used since 2023

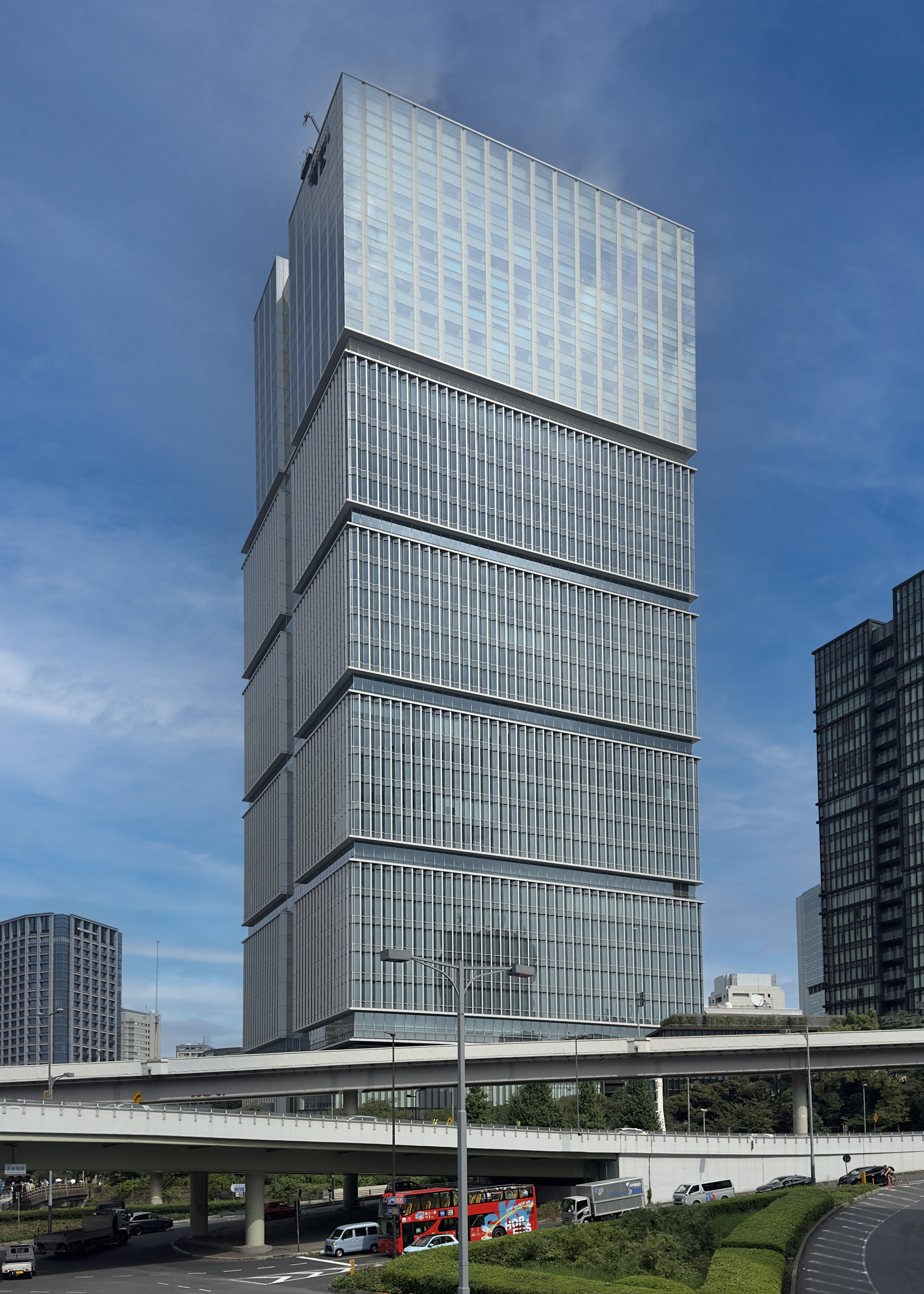
- Headquarters in Kioichō, Chiyoda, Tokyo
- Native name: LINEヤフー株式会社
- Romanized name: LINE Yahū Kabushiki-gaisha
- Type: Public
- Traded as: TYO: 4689
- Predecessor: Z Holdings; Line Corporation; Yahoo! Japan; Z Entertainment; Z Data
- Founded: October 1, 2023; 3 years ago
- Headquarters: 1–3, Kioichō, Chiyoda, Tokyo, Japan
- Key people: Kentarō Kawabe (chairman); Takeshi Idezawa (CEO); Shin Jung-ho (GCPO)
- Services: Yahoo! Japan; Line
- Revenue: 1,672,377,000,000 yen (2023)
- Owner: A Holdings (62.3%) (Naver Corporation,Permodalan Nasional Berhad and SoftBank Group)
- Subsidiaries: ASKUL Corporation
- Website: www.lycorp.co.jp/en/

LY Corporation (LINEヤフー株式会社, LINE Yahū Kabushiki-gaisha; lit. 'Line Yahoo Corporation'), trading as LYC, is a Japanese internet company majority-owned by A Holdings, a joint venture between SoftBank Group of Japan, Permodalan Nasional Berhad of Malaysia and Naver Corporation of South Korea. It was formed on October 1, 2023, through the merger of Z Holdings (ZHD) and four of its subsidiaries, including Line Corporation and Yahoo! Japan.

== History ==
In March 2021, Z Holdings, the parent company of Yahoo! Japan, and Line Corporation completed a business integration. The companies aimed to reduce costs by unifying overlapping services, such as QR code payments, and to drive user traffic across their approximately 200 services, focusing on the core areas of search, messaging applications, and advertising. They initially planned to link user IDs across the group by the end of fiscal 2022.

However, shortly after the integration, it was revealed that Line users' personal information had been accessible to engineers at a Chinese affiliate without adequate disclosure to users. Consequently, the ID linkage was delayed while the group reviewed its data management framework. In August 2022, ZHD announced revised plans to link the user IDs of Line, Yahoo! Japan, and PayPay in 2023 or later to strengthen mutual traffic.

By the fourth quarter of fiscal 2022, ZHD's consolidated financial results showed sluggish growth: revenue in its core advertising business declined by 1.2% year-on-year, while growth in domestic e-commerce—a sector in which ZHD aimed to lead the Japanese market in transaction volume—slowed to 0.9%. Addressing the downturn, ZHD President Kentarō Kawabe remarked, "ZHD's services are losing their competitive edge against rivals, and we have a strong sense of crisis."

In February 2023, ZHD announced plans to merge ZHD, Yahoo! Japan, and Line Corporation into a single entity by the end of fiscal 2023. Following the 2021 integration, ZHD and Line Corporation had continued to operate as separate corporate entities, which Kawabe noted had "worked for the transitional period, but in order to promote further integration, we will unify and accelerate decision-making."

In March 2023, Yahoo! Japan, Line, and PayPay launched a joint loyalty program called "LYP Mileage," through which users purchasing eligible items at participating stores accumulate miles redeemable for PayPay points. Yahoo! Japan President Takashi Ozawa described the initiative as "a long-cherished plan that has finally come to fruition."

On April 28, 2023, the group announced that the merged company would be named Line Yahoo in Japanese and LY Corporation in English, with ZHD CEO Takeshi Idezawa appointed to lead the new entity. Idezawa stated, "The business environment is still challenging, but we will fundamentally streamline our business through the merger." In July 2023, ZHD announced the consolidation of its domestic financial businesses, merging Line Securities and personal loan provider Line Credit into Z Financial, an intermediate holding company overseeing PayPay Bank and PayPay Securities.

On October 1, 2023, ZHD and four of its subsidiaries—Line Corporation, Yahoo! Japan, Z Entertainment, and Z Data—officially merged to form LY Corporation.

== Security and data breach ==
In October 2023, LY Corporation suffered a cyberattack via systems shared with Naver Cloud, resulting in the unauthorized leak of approximately 520,000 personal data records of Line users, partners, and employees.

In response to the breach, Japan's Ministry of Internal Affairs and Communications (MIC) issued an initial administrative guidance to LY Corporation on March 5, 2024, instructing the company to overhaul its security governance and disentangle its technical infrastructure from South Korea's Naver. Deeming the company's initial improvement plan insufficient, the MIC issued a second administrative guidance on April 16, 2024, requiring LY Corporation to accelerate the separation of its systems from Naver, review its capital relationship, and submit a comprehensive progress report by July 1, 2024.

== See also ==
- SoftBank Group
- Line
- Yahoo! Japan
- PayPay
