= Z Holdings =

Japanese technology company

Z Holdings Corporation
- Z Holdings logo

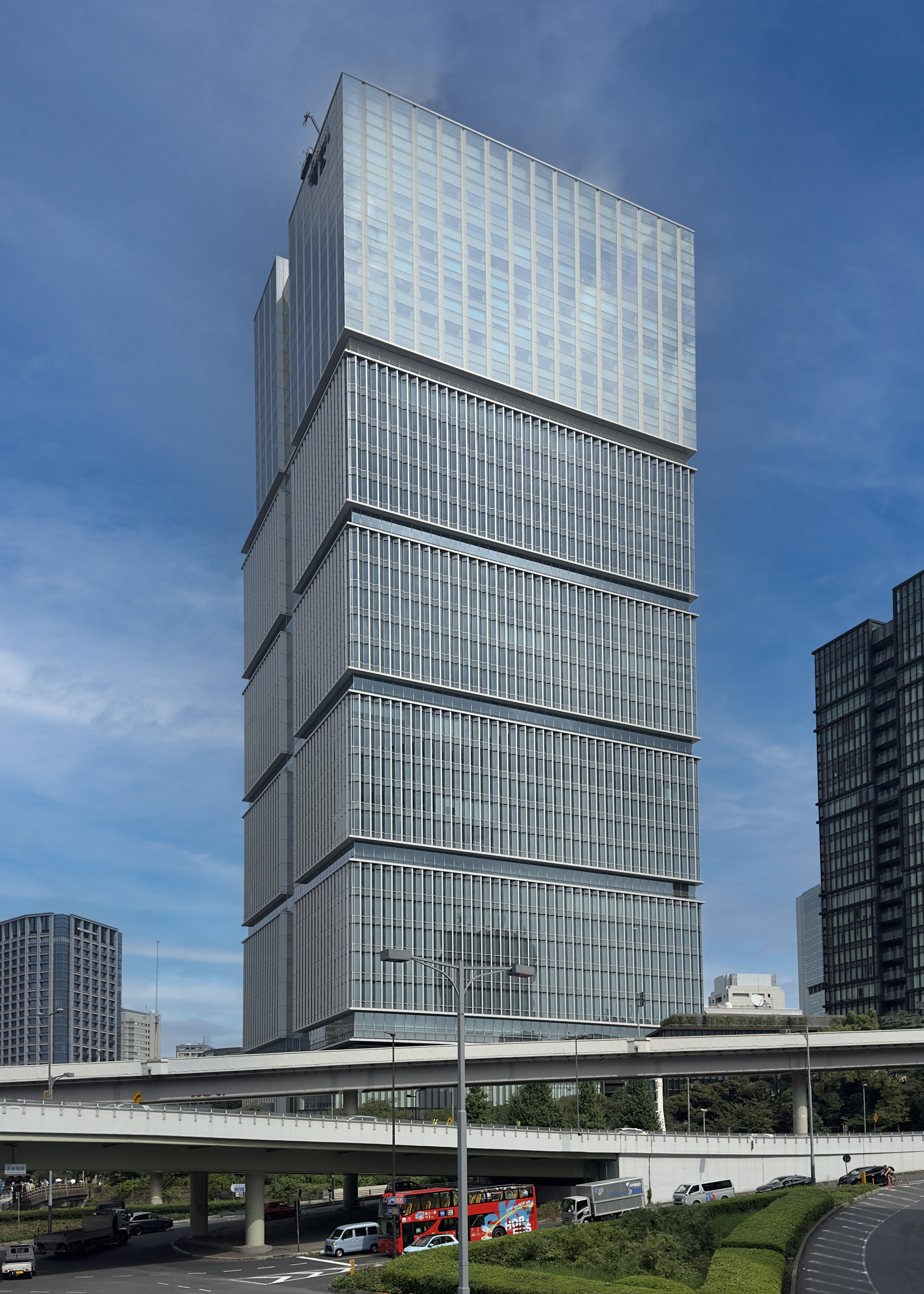
- Headquarters at Tokyo Garden Terrace Kioicho in Kioichō, Chiyoda, Tokyo
- Native name: Zホールディングス株式会社
- Type: Public
- Traded as: TYO: 4689; TOPIX 100 component
- Industry: Internet and Telecommunications
- Founded: October 1, 2019; 7 years ago
- Defunct: October 1, 2023
- Fate: Merged with four of its subsidiaries, including Yahoo! Japan and Line Corporation
- Successor: LY Corporation
- Headquarters: Tokyo, Japan
- Area served: Worldwide
- Products: Yahoo! Japan, PayPay, Line
- Services: Yahoo! Japan, Line App, Line Manga, Line Play, Line Taxi
- Owner: A Holdings (63,9%) (Softbank Group and Naver Corporation)
- Subsidiaries: Yahoo Japan Corporation; Line Corporation; Zozo; Askul; ValueCommerce; PayPay (joint venture); Z Financial
- Website: www.z-holdings.co.jp

Z Holdings Corporation (Zホールディングス株式会社) was a Japanese internet holding company owned by A Holdings, a joint venture between SoftBank Group and Naver Corporation. It was founded in 2019 as a result of Yahoo! Japan Corporation's change to a holding company structure. In 2020, it merged with Line Corporation, a subsidiary of South Korean Naver Corporation, and became a subsidiary of A Holdings, a joint venture between SoftBank Group and Naver Corp. As a result, Line Corporation became a subsidiary of Z Holdings. In 2023, Z Holdings merged with four of its subsidiaries, including Yahoo! Japan and Line Corporation, to form LY Corporation.

== History ==
Originally, the company was established as Yahoo Japan Corporation in January 1996, but on October 1, 2019, it changed to a holding company structure due to a company split and changed its corporate name.

Due to the reorganization of the group centered on Yahoo Japan Corporation in 2019, the information and communication business division (Yahoo! JAPAN business) was absorbed and split into Yahoo Japan Corporation, and the financial enterprise management division was split into Z Financial Co., Ltd. and transferred to a holding company, and is responsible for the management function of the entire group centered on subsidiaries from the time of the first corporation.

In November 2019 an announcement was made that a joint venture between Softbank Corp and Naver Corporation was agreed upon to merge the Z holdings corporation with Line Corporation. Under which LINE, as well as various other assets of the Z Holdings Corporation, would be controlled by another holding company called A Holdings Corporation. The A Holdings Corporation ownership was then split 50% between Naver and Softbank Corp.

In March 2021 Line Corporation officially merged with Yahoo! Japan, which had been operated by Z Holdings. Upon integrating the two businesses and creating further platforms, the merged company aims to compete with the U.S. tech giants Google, Amazon, Facebook, and Apple and the Chinese tech giants Baidu, Alibaba, and Tencent, as well as the Japanese e-commerce giant Rakuten. The merger also gives Z Holdings three additional Asian markets where Line is popular: Taiwan, Thailand, Indonesia, and Malaysia.

Founded in 2021, LINE Bank is a commercial bank headquartered in Taipei, Taiwan, and owned by Z Holdings.

In July 2022, SoftBank Corp and Z Holdings announced that they would consolidate PayPay, a smartphone payment service. SoftBank Group, the parent company of SoftBank Corp, had a 50% stake in PayPay and was a consolidated subsidiary. However, SoftBank Corp and Z Holdings jointly invested and established a new holding company called B Holdings. B Holdings became the parent company with a 57.9% stake in PayPay by converting PayPay's preferred shares to common shares, etc.

On October 1, 2023, Z Holdings merged with its subsidiaries, Line, Yahoo!, Z Entertainment, and Z Data, to form LY Corporation, a joint venture between SoftBank Group and Naver Corp.
