= Parkjockey =

American company

ParkJockey
- Type: Privately held company
- Industry: Software, hardware
- Founded: 2013; 13 years ago
- Founders: Umut Tekin; Ari Ojalvo
- Headquarters: Miami, Florida, U.S.
- Area served: United States & United Kingdom
- Key people: Philippe Saint-Just (CTO); George Fallica (CRO)
- Number of employees: 15,000
- Website: parkjockey.com

ParkJockey was an American parking technology company based in Miami, Florida. Founded in 2013, it sold software and payment hardware to parking operators and commercial property owners, and ran a consumer mobile app for reserving and paying for off-street parking.

In December 2018 the company confirmed an investment from SoftBank Group, reported at between $800 million and $1 billion, that valued it at more than $1 billion and financed the purchase of two of North America's largest parking operators. It was relaunched under the name REEF Technology in June 2019.

== History and growth ==
ParkJockey was co-founded by two former management consultants in Chicago. Having diagnosed a number of inefficiencies in the parking industry, they lay the foundation of ParkJockey with a website for paying for off-street parking spaces. In 2013, ParkJockey raised $1.8 million in angel investment to develop a mobile app and has formally launched its services later in the year. Seeing a potential for growth in Europe, ParkJockey launched its London office in 2014 to serve all of the U.K. market.

Since then, the company has undergone further investment rounds and has grown to become a B2B real estate technology platform offering landlords and parking operators hardware and software to manage and optimize parking operations, including big data services.

It is headquartered in Miami, with operations across the U.S. and the U.K.

On December 3, 2018, financial and technology news media reported that Softbank Group and Mubadala have recently bought stakes in ParkJockey, primarily to finance planned acquisitions of parking lot operators, with the total investment amount approximated to be between $800 million and $1 billion.

ParkJockey changed their name to REEF technology in 2019.

== Partnerships ==
Ticketmaster

In January 2015, ParkJockey announced a partnership with the largest ticket sales company, Ticketmaster. The exclusive partnership is currently limited to the U.K. market.

Miami Heat and FTX

In December 2014, ParkJockey became the official parking provider for the NBA franchise HEAT Group. For all Miami HEAT games and other events (e.g., concerts) at the FTX Arena, ParkJockey provides parking spaces in advance.

PaybyPhone

ParkJockey and PayByPhone (subsidiary of PayPoint, LSE: PAY) announced a mutually exclusive partnership in late 2015. The companies decided to blend their services in order to provide better assistance for their customers.

ResDiary

ResDiary, online reservations system, partnered with ParkJockey in 2015. ParkJockey provides parking for the customers who book their restaurant reservations through ResDiary.

Odeon Cinemas

ParkJockey partnered with Odeon Cinemas in 2014. The company offers parking for Odeon customers who would like to have their parking space reserved along with their cinema tickets.

== Charitable activities ==
ParkJockey has made financial contributions to Phil Collins' Little Dreams Foundation and The Gurkha Welfare Trust, and supported the It Gets Better Project during the 2015 Pride Week.
