= PayPay =

Payment system

PayPay Corporation

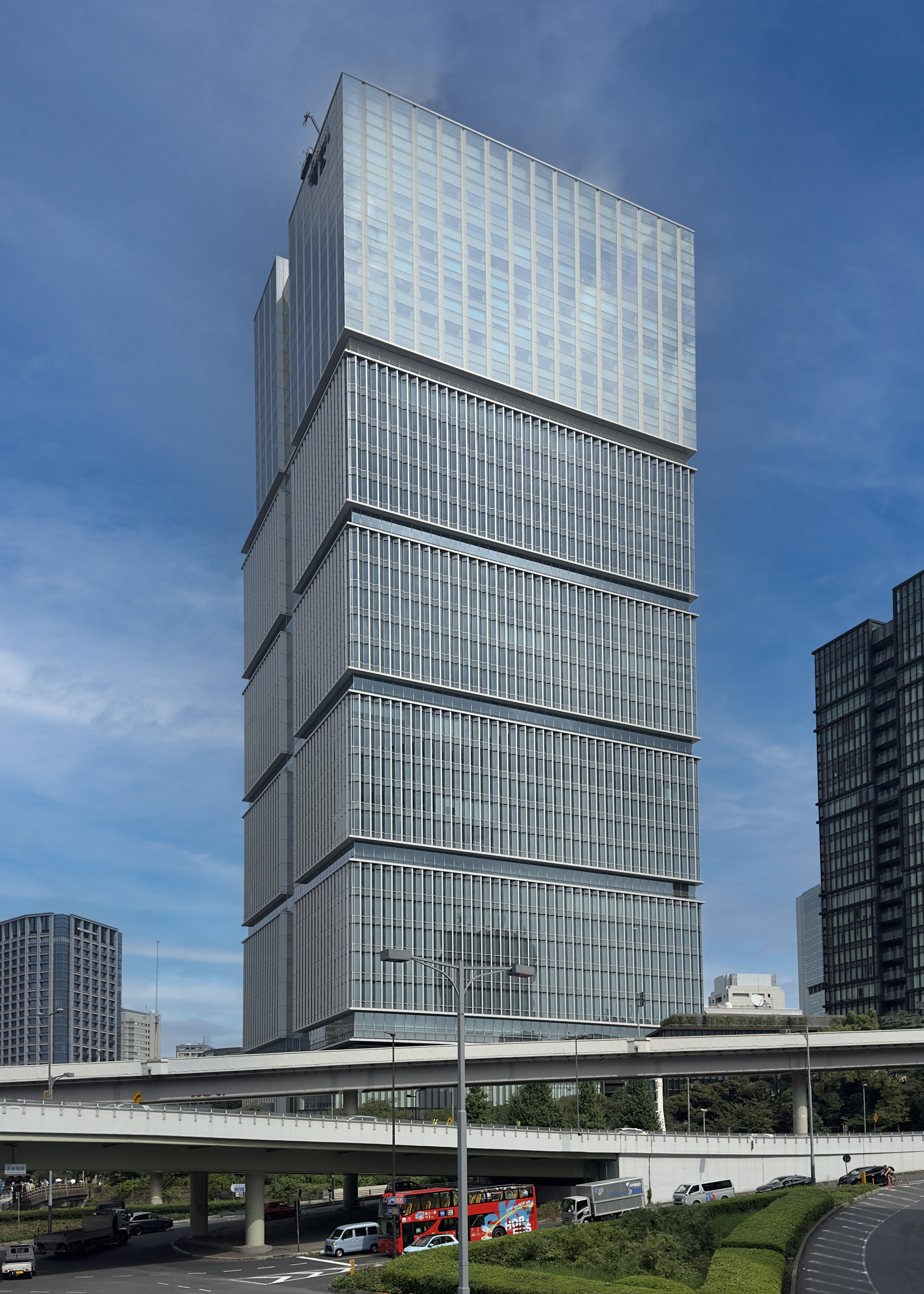
- Headquarters in Chiyoda, Tokyo
- Native name: PayPay株式会社
- Company type: Public
- Traded as: Nasdaq: PAYP
- Founded: June 15, 2018; 7 years ago
- Headquarters: Chiyoda, Tokyo, Japan
- Products: Electronic payment system
- Parent: LY Corporation (SoftBank Group)
- Website: paypay.ne.jp

PayPay Corporation (PayPay株式会社) is a Japanese company that develops electronic payment services owned by LY Corporation. It was established in 2018 as a joint venture between the SoftBank Group and Yahoo Japan through Z Holdings, their holding company. With 38 million users, PayPay is the largest Japanese mobile payment app. In October 2018, it began a QR code and bar code-based payment service, which was developed in collaboration with Paytm, an India-based payment service company.

From a smartphone app, users link their bank account and add money to their PayPay account. At the point of sale, the user makes a payment either by scanning a QR code, or by having the clerk scan a bar code on the smartphone.

In March 2026, PayPay completed an initial public offering on the Nasdaq in the United States, raising $880 million and valuing the company at $10.7 billion.

== 2020 cybersecurity incident ==
PayPay's server fell victim to a hacking attack, originating in Brazil, on November 28, 2020. As per the operator of PayPay, a server containing personal and financial information of its entire userbase was compromised. The company acknowledged that configuration flaws led to unauthorized access to information. The service operator was later notified of the incident and preventive measures were taken.
