= Line Corporation =

Former Japanese internet company

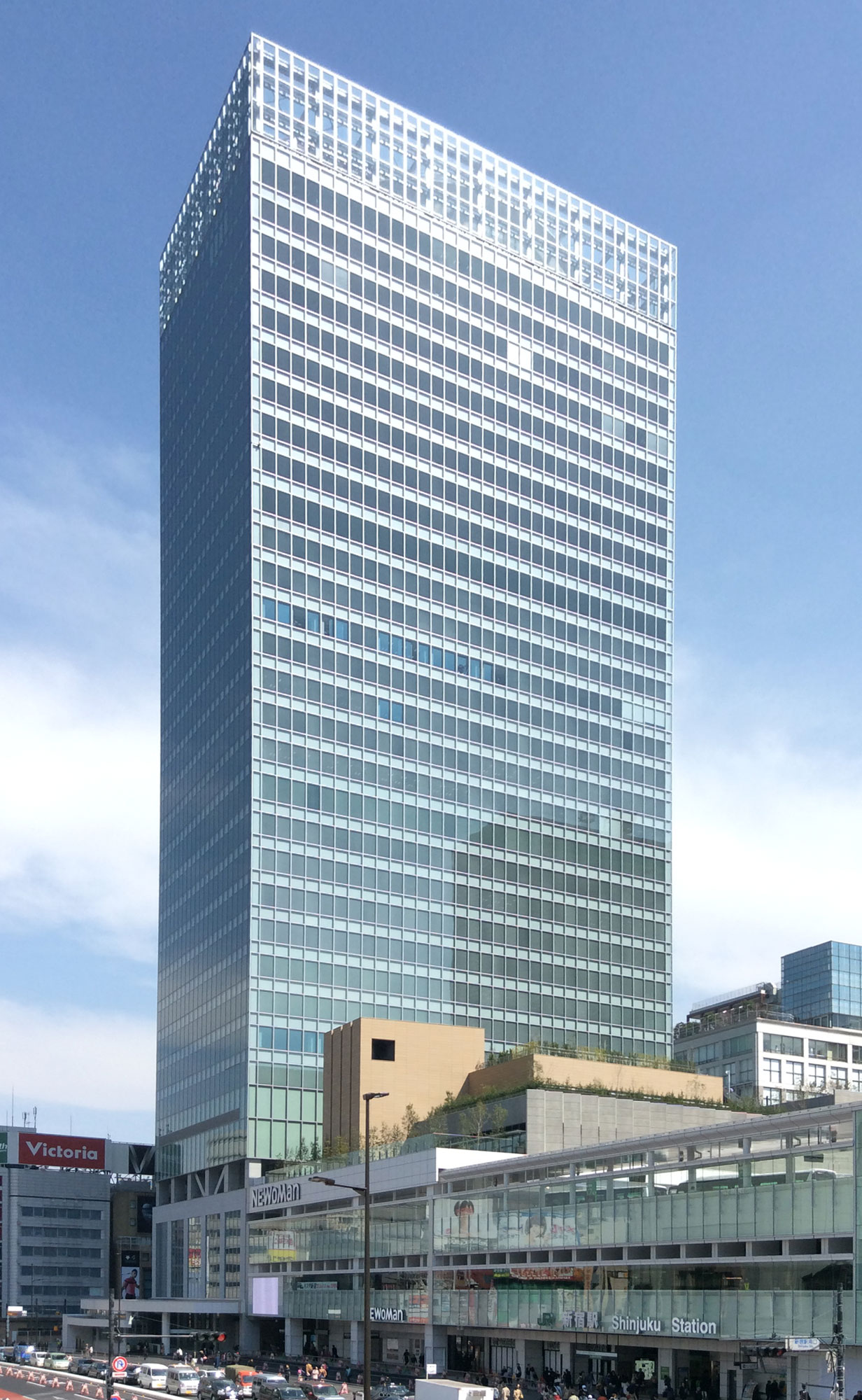
- Line Corporation's headquarters
- Native name: LINE株式会社
- Formerly: Hangame Japan (2000-2003); NHN Japan (2003-2013)
- Type: Kabushiki gaisha Public (2016-2020); Subsidiary (2020-)
- Traded as: TYO: 3938 (2016–2020); NYSE: LN (2016–2020)
- Industry: Internet and Telecommunications
- Founded: September 4, 2000; 26 years ago, in Tokyo, Japan
- Defunct: October 1, 2023
- Fate: Japanese operations transferred to LY Corporation; renamed company continues as a holding for overseas operations
- Successor: LY Corporation (operations); Z Intermediate Global Corporation (legal entity)
- Headquarters: Shinjuku, Tokyo, Japan
- Area served: Worldwide
- Key people: Takeshi Idezawa (CEO)
- Products: Line
- Parent: Naver Corporation (2013–2021, majority); Z Holdings (2021–2023, 100%); LY Corporation (2023-, 100%)
- Subsidiaries: Line Plus Corporation; Line Digital Frontier; Line Company (Thailand)

Line Corporation (LINE株式会社, LINE Kabushiki gaisha) was a Japanese internet company headquartered in Shinjuku, Tokyo, best known for the messaging app Line. It was majority-owned by the South Korean internet company Naver from 2013 to 2021. From March 2021 it was a wholly owned subsidiary of Z Holdings, which was in turn controlled by A Holdings Corporation, a joint venture in which SoftBank Corp. and Naver each held a 50% stake.

On the 1 October 2023, Line Corporation transferred its Japanese business to LY Corporation and was renamed Z Intermediate Global Corporation, itself becoming a subsidiary of LY Corporation. It continues to hold the group's overseas subsidiaries under the new name.

== History ==
Line Corporation was founded on September 4, 2000, as Hangame Japan as a part of Hangame, a South Korean game company owned by NHN at the time. In August 2003, the company was renamed to NHN Japan.

In 2007 Naver established another Japanese subsidiary Naver Japan, which managed the Naver search engine in Japan before its demise. Naver Japan acquired Livedoor in 2010.

In 2012, Naver merged the three entities (NHN Japan, Naver Japan, Livedoor) into a new subsidiary known as NHN Japan.

On April 1, 2013, the company changed its name and traded as Line Corporation. Later that same year, NHN split into two companies, Naver Corporation and NHN Entertainment Corporation and the latter created a new NHN Japan Corporation subsidiary.

In July 2016, Line Corporation held IPOs on both the New York Stock Exchange and the Tokyo Stock Exchange.

=== Merger with Yahoo Japan ===
In 2019, in preparation for the merger with Yahoo Japan, Line Corporation (the original entity) was reorganized into a holding company and established as Line Split Preparation Corporation, and in 2021, it changed its company name to Line Corporation (2nd generation) by taking over the business from the original entity. At this time, the original entity changed its name to A Holdings Corporation.

In late December 2020, Line delisted from both the New York Stock Exchange and the Tokyo Stock Exchange, in advance of its absorption-type merger agreement with Z Holdings.

In March 2021, Line Corporation merged with Yahoo Japan, which had been operated by Z Holdings, a SoftBank Group subsidiary. Under the new structure, Naver Corporation (Line's former parent company) and SoftBank Corporation (the wireless carrier unit of SoftBank Group) each held 50% stakes in a new company named A Holdings Corporation, which held a majority stake in Z Holdings, which will operate Line and Yahoo Japan. Upon integrating the two businesses and creating further platforms, the merged company aimed to compete with the U.S. tech giants Google, Amazon, Facebook, and Apple and the Chinese tech giants Baidu, Alibaba, and Tencent, as well as the Japanese e-commerce giant Rakuten. The merger also gave Z Holdings three additional markets where Line is popular: Taiwan, Thailand, and Indonesia.

In April 2021, Line Corporation launched Line Bank, a commercial bank headquartered in Taipei.

=== Merger into LY Corporation ===
On February 2, 2023, Z Holdings announced its intention to merge with its subsidiaries, Line and Yahoo Japan, during the fiscal year 2023. On October 1 of the same year, Yahoo, Z Entertainment, and Z Data merged into Z Holdings and changed their name to LY Corporation. Line Corporation transferred its assets, rights, and businesses to LY Corporation through absorption-type split except for certain overseas stocks, and changed its name to the current one. It is expected to become a holding company managing overseas subsidiaries' stocks and other assets through business reorganization.
