= SoftBank Group =

Japanese investment holding company

SoftBank Group Corp.

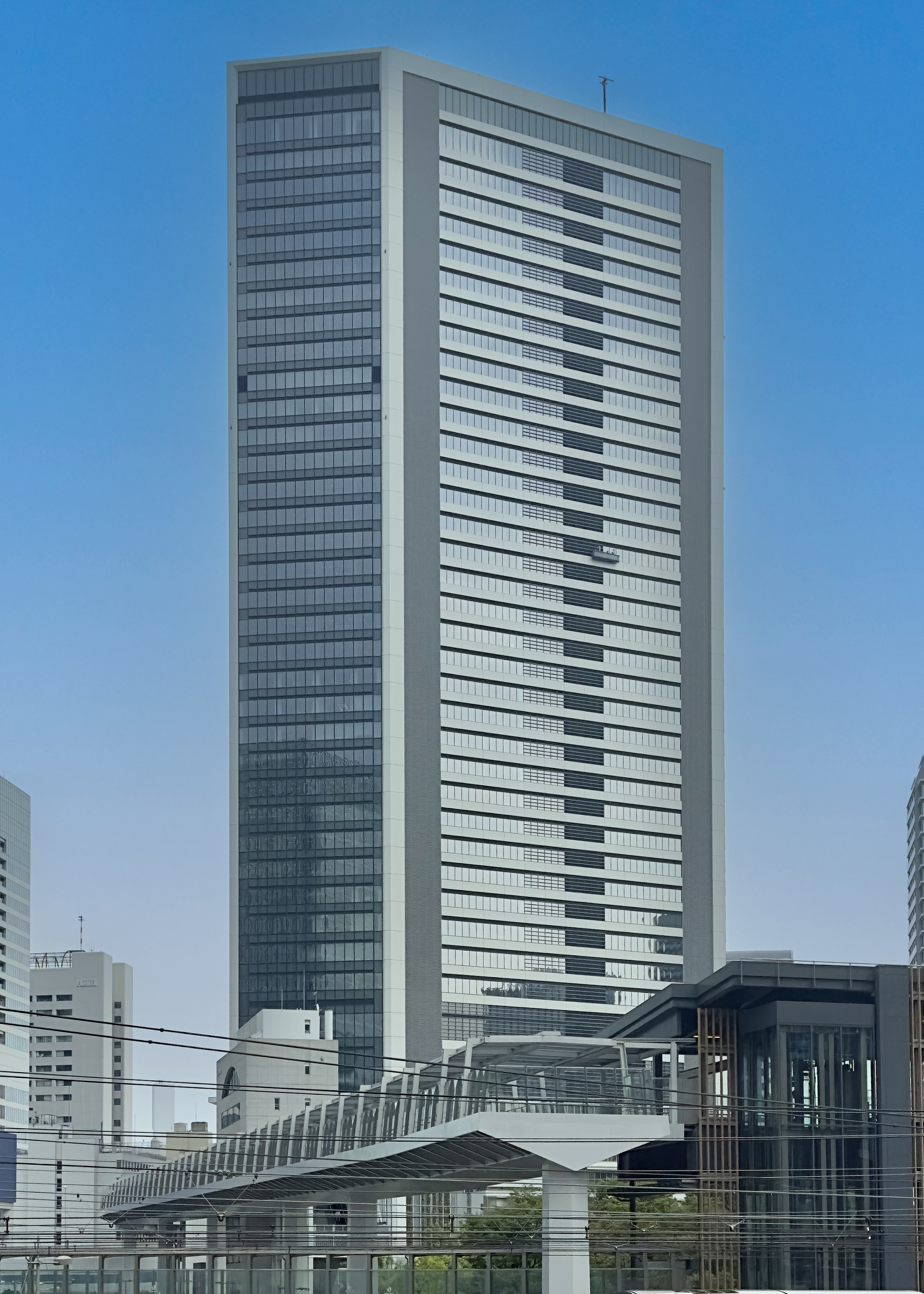
- Headquarters in Kaigan, Minato, Tokyo
- Native name: ソフトバンクグループ株式会社
- Romanized name: SofutoBanku Gurūpu Kabushiki gaisha
- Formerly: SoftBank Corp. (1981-2015)
- Type: Public
- Traded as: TYO: 9984; TOPIX Core30 component; Nikkei 225 component
- ISIN: JP3436100006
- Industry: Conglomerate; Holding company; Venture capital
- Founded: 3 September 1981; 45 years ago
- Founder: Masayoshi Son
- Headquarters: Tokyo PortCity Takeshiba, Minato, Tokyo, Japan
- Key people: Masayoshi Son (chairman and CEO)
- Services: Investment management; Financial services; Venture capital
- Revenue: ▲¥7.8 trillion (US$49.26 billion) (FY2026)
- Operating income: ▲¥6.13 trillion (US$38.75 billion) (FY2026)
- Net income: ▲¥5 trillion (US$31.6 billion) (FY2026)
- Total assets: ▲¥60.75 trillion (US$383.72 billion) (FY2026)
- Total equity: ▲¥20.47 trillion (US$129.29 billion) (FY2026)
- Owner: Masayoshi Son (29.14% economic, 71.36% voting)
- Number of employees: ▲73,677 (consolidated, 2026)
- Subsidiaries: SoftBank Group Capital Limited; Softbank Corp (50%); SB Pan Pacific Corporation; Alibaba Group (14.2%); Stargate (40%); Coupang (26.7%); DiDi (21.5％); DigitalBridge; Arm Holdings (87.1%); Fukuoka SoftBank Hawks; Ampere Computing; OpenAI (14%); T-Mobile US (7.6%); SB Investment Advisers (UK); SB Global Advisers; SB Energy; Graphcore
- ASN: 17676
- Website: group.softbank

SoftBank Group Corp. (Japanese: ソフトバンクグループ株式会社, Hepburn: SofutoBanku Gurūpu Kabushiki gaisha) is a Japanese multinational investment holding company headquartered in Minato, Tokyo, that focuses on investment management. The group primarily invests in companies operating in technology that offer goods and services to customers in a multitude of markets and industries ranging from the internet to automation. With over $100 billion in capital at its onset, SoftBank's Vision Fund is the world's largest technology-focused venture capital fund. Fund investors included sovereign wealth funds from countries in the Middle East.

The company is known for the leadership of its controversial founder and largest shareholder Masayoshi Son. Its investee companies, subsidiaries and divisions, including several unprofitable unicorns, operate in robotics, artificial intelligence, software, logistics, transportation, biotechnology, robotic process automation, proptech, real estate, hospitality, broadband, fixed-line telecommunications, e-commerce, information technology, finance, media and marketing, and other areas. Among its international stockholdings are stakes in Arm (semiconductors), Alibaba (e-commerce), OYO Rooms (hospitality), WeWork (coworking) and Deutsche Telekom (telecommunications). SoftBank Corporation, its spun-out affiliate and former flagship business, is the third-largest wireless carrier in Japan, with 45.621 million subscribers as of March 2021.

SoftBank is ranked in the 2026 Forbes Global 2000 list as the 54th largest public company in the world. The logo of SoftBank is based on the flag of the Kaientai, a naval trading company founded in 1865, near the end of the Tokugawa shogunate, by Sakamoto Ryōma. Although SoftBank does not affiliate itself to any traditional keiretsu, it has close ties with Mizuho Financial Group, its primary lender.

On January 21, 2025, it was announced that Softbank, along with OpenAI, MGX, and Oracle, would launch what was announced to be an artificial intelligence infrastructure system in conjunction with the U.S. government, titled Stargate. The project is estimated to cost $500 billion. U.S. president Donald Trump stated that the infrastructure was developed to have American-made AI in the United States. The project will be funded over the course of the next four years.

== History ==
=== Founding and early years ===
SoftBank was founded on 3 September 1981 as SOFTBANK Corp by then-24-year-old Masayoshi Son, initially as a software distributor. The company entered the publishing business in May 1982 with the launches of the Oh! PC and Oh! MZ magazines, about NEC and Sharp computers respectively. Oh!PC had a circulation of 140,000 copies by 1989. It would go on to become Japan's largest publisher of computer and technology magazines and trade shows.

In 1994, the company went public, valued at $3 billion. In September 1995, SoftBank agreed to purchase US-based Ziff Davis publishing for $2.1 billion.

=== 1995–2009 expansion ===
In the 1990s, Son made large investments in Internet services and the so-called new economy in general. SoftBank bought COMDEX from The Interface Group on 1 April 1995 for $800 million and ZDI on 29 February 1996. SoftBank sold COMDEX to Key3Media, a spin-off of Ziff Davis, in 2001. In 1996, SoftBank formed a joint venture with American internet company Yahoo!, creating Yahoo! Japan (now LY Corporation), which would become a dominant site in the country.

In another highly publicized investment, SoftBank bought 80% of memory manufacturer Kingston Technology in 1996. When the owners-founders (John Tu and David Sun) announced plans to distribute $100,000,000 of the $1.5B windfall to Kingston employees, it created a very high-profile media stir that lasted well through the 1996 Christmas season; it was on all US networks, as well as international media. A few years later, in 1999, after the market for memory softened substantially, SoftBank sold the company back at a loss to the original owners for about a third of the original price.

In October 1999, SoftBank became a holding company. In 2000, SoftBank made its most successful investment – $20 million to a then-fledgling Chinese Internet venture called Alibaba. This investment turned into $60 billion when Alibaba went public in September 2014.

In February 2000, SoftBank Ventures Asia was founded under the leadership of Masayoshi Son to focus on investment in Korean-based Internet companies.

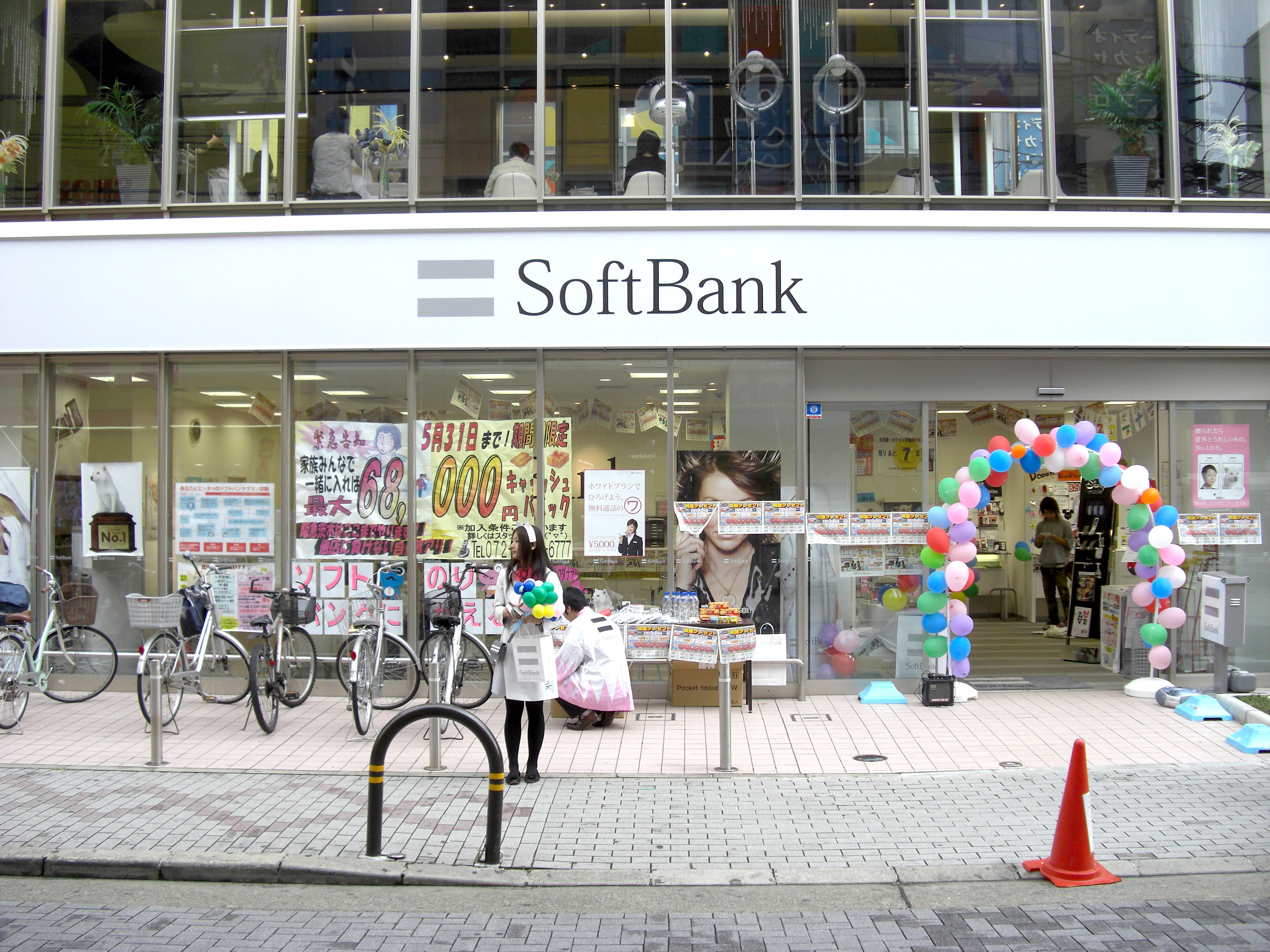
SoftBank store in Ibaraki, Osaka, Japan

On 28 January 2005, SoftBank became the owner of the Fukuoka SoftBank Hawks, a Nippon Professional Baseball team. On 17 March 2006, SoftBank announced its agreement to buy Vodafone Japan, giving it a stake in Japan's $78 billion mobile markets. In April 2006, SoftBank purchased a 23% stake in Betfair, an Internet betting exchange. In August 2006, SoftBank sold all its shares of SBI Group to a subsidiary of SBI's holding company, making SBI independent. On 1 October 2006, Vodafone Japan changed its corporate name and service brand name to "SoftBank Mobile" and "SoftBank" respectively.

On 28 January 2008, it was announced that SoftBank and Tiffany & Co. collaborated in making a limited 10 model-only phone. This phone contains more than 400 platinum diamonds, totaling more than 20 carats. The cost is said to be more than 100,000,000 yen.

=== 2010–2016 acquisitions ===
On 3 February 2010, SoftBank acquired 13.7% in Ustream. On 1 October 2010, Ayumi Hamasaki became the commercial spokesperson.

On 3 October 2012, the takeover of competitor eAccess was announced. On 1 July 2013, SoftBank announced that Willcom was a wholly owned subsidiary, after the termination of rehabilitation proceedings. eAccess was merged with Willcom, which resulted in a new subsidiary and brand from Yahoo! Japan, Ymobile Corporation.

On 15 October 2012, SoftBank announced plans to take control of American Sprint Nextel by purchasing a 70% stake for $20 billion. On 6 July 2013, the United States Federal Communications Commission approved SoftBank's acquisition for $22.2 billion for a 78% ownership interest in Sprint. On 6 August 2013, SoftBank bought 2% more shares of Sprint Corporation, increasing its ownership stake to 80%.

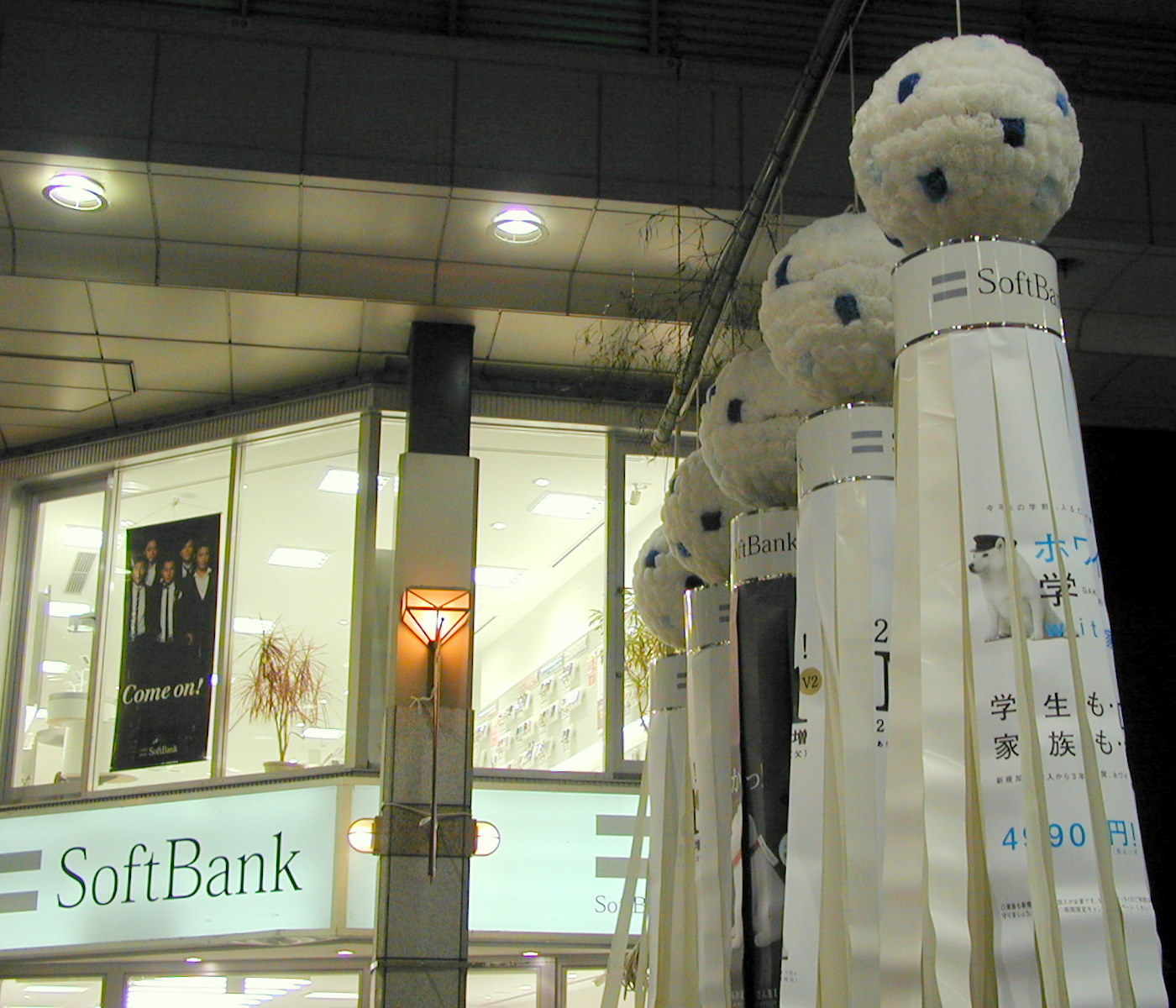
SoftBank store in Sendai, with decorations for the Tanabata

In October 2013, SoftBank acquired a 51% stake in Supercell for a reported $2.1 billion. Later on 25 October 2014, they invested $210 million in OlaCabs, $627 million in Snapdeal with a 30% stake in the company on 28 October 2014, and a $100 million investment in Housing.com for a 30% stake in November 2014.

In 2013, the company bought a controlling stake in French company Aldebaran Robotics, which was rebranded SoftBank Robotics. In 2014, teams from both companies co-designed Pepper, a humanoid robot. In 2015, SoftBank increased its stake to 95%.

On 28 September 2014, it was reported that SoftBank was in talks to acquire animated film studio DreamWorks Animation for $3.4 billion, following the box office underperformances of Rise of the Guardians, Turbo and Mr. Peabody & Sherman. The following day, it was reported that SoftBank withdrew its offer. The studio would later go on to be acquired by Comcast subsidiary NBCUniversal in 2016.

In 2015, SoftBank acquired DramaFever. In May 2015, Masayoshi Son said he would appoint Nikesh Arora, a former Google executive, as Representative Director and President of SoftBank. Arora had been heading SoftBank's investment arm. On 1 June 2015, SoftBank acquired an additional 22.7% stake in Supercell, increasing its total stake to 73.2% and becoming the sole external shareholder of the company. In June 2015, SoftBank announced it would invest US$1 billion in the Korean e-commerce website Coupang as part of its overseas expansion plans.

In July 2015, SoftBank announced the renaming of the company from SoftBank Corp to SoftBank Group Corp. Meanwhile, SoftBank Mobile was renamed to SoftBank Corp, the now-former name of the company as a whole. On 16 February 2016, SoftBank announced they would repurchase a record 14.2% of shares, valued at $4.4bn, to boost investor confidence. On 31 March 2016, they announced they would sell shares worth $7.9 billion of their stake in Alibaba Group. On 21 June 2016, SoftBank sold its 84% stake in Supercell for a reported US$7.3 billion to Tencent. On 3 June 2016, Softbank agreed to sell most of its stake in GungHo Online Entertainment (approximately 23.47%) for about $685 million, ending Softbank's majority ownership. The offer was completed by 22 June.

In June 2016, Nikesh Arora stepped down amidst pressure from investors. Board member Ron Fisher and Baer Capital Partners founder Alok Sama undertook Arora's overseas investment duties. One month later, Son announced the company's largest deal ever to buy British chip designer Arm Holdings for more than US$32 billion. This acquisition was completed on 5 September 2016.

On 6 December 2016, after meeting with the then United States President-elect Donald Trump, chief executive Masayoshi Son announced SoftBank would be investing US$50 billion in the United States toward businesses creating 50,000 new jobs.

=== 2017–2018 ===
On 30 January 2017, the Wall Street Journal wrote that SoftBank Group was "weighing an investment of well over $1 billion in shared-office space company WeWork, in what could be among the first deals from its new $100 billion technology fund." On 20 March, SoftBank bought a $300m stake in WeWork. On 14 February 2017, SoftBank Group agreed to buy Fortress Investment Group LLC for $3.3 billion. In February 2017, it was announced that Social Finance Inc. was close to raising $500 million from an investor group led by Silver Lake, including Softbank. On 28 March 2017, the Wall Street Journal reported that SoftBank Group Corporation had approached Didi Chuxing Technology Co. about investing $6 billion to help the ride-hailing firm expand in self-driving car technologies, with the bulk of the money to come from SoftBank's planned $100 billion Vision Fund.

On 18 May 2017, it was reported that Softbank had completed its single largest investment in India to date, investing $1.4 billion in Paytm. At the time, Softbank was also working on a takeover of Snapdeal by Flipkart. On 10 August 2017, Softbank invested $2.5 billion in Flipkart.

On 27 May 2017, Softbank and the Public Investment Fund of Saudi Arabia (PIF), the kingdom's main sovereign wealth fund, partnered to create the Softbank Vision Fund, the world's largest private equity fund with a capital of $93 billion. Softbank Group contributed $28 billion to the investment fund, of which $8.2 billion came from the sale of approximately 25% of British multinational Arm Holdings shares. Saudi Arabia is the principal investor in the fund, its Public Investment Fund (PIF) agreed to inject $45 billion into the Vision Fund over 5 years, becoming its largest investor. Other investors include Apple, Qualcomm, Arm, Foxconn, Sharp, Larry Ellison and Mubadala. The latter agreed to invest $15 billion dollars in the fund, targeting artificial intelligence, communications infrastructure, financial technology, consumer internet, mobile computing and robotics. Through Softbank Vision Fund, CEO Masayoshi Son explained his intent to invest in all companies developing technologies emphasizing global artificial intelligence, including sectors such as finance or transportation.

In July 2019, SoftBank announced creating of a "Vision Fund 2", excluding participation from the Saudi Arabia government and including investors Apple, Foxconn, Microsoft and others. The fund is reported to focus on AI-based technology and invest approximately $108 billion, including $38 billion of its own funds. In February 2020, however, a report from Wall Street Journal stated the fund would only up with less than half of that capital.

On 8 June 2017, Alphabet Inc. announced the sale of Boston Dynamics (robotics companies whose products include BigDog) to SoftBank Group for an undisclosed sum. On 25 August 2017, SoftBank finalized a $4.4 billion investment in WeWork. On 24 October 2017, Son announced the group would collaborate with Saudi Arabia to develop Neom, the new high-tech business and industrial city of the Saudi Kingdom. On 14 November 2017, Softbank agreed to invest $10 billion into Uber. On 29 December 2017, it was reported that a SoftBank-led consortium had invested $9 billion into Uber. The deal, to close in January 2018, would leave SoftBank as Uber's biggest shareholder, with a 15 percent stake. The deal was secured after Uber shareholders voted to "sell their shares to the Japanese conglomerate at a discounted price." Beyond SoftBank, consortium members included Dragoneer, Tencent, TPG and Sequoia.

On 14 January 2018, Softbank's Vision Fund announced to invest $560 million in the German used-car sales portal Auto1. On 1 March 2018, Softbank's Vision Fund led a $535 million investment in DoorDash. In May 2018, CEO Masayoshi Son revealed during an earnings presentation that Walmart had reached a deal to buy Flipkart. On 27 September 2018, Softbank announced the investment of $400 Million in Home-Selling Startup Opendoor. In September 2018, Saudi government officials announced that a planned $200 billion project with SoftBank Group to build the world's biggest solar-power-generation project would be put on hold. In November 2018, SoftBank announced it would make an IPO of SoftBank Corp., the telecommunications operator, with the cost of share of $13.22 (which is 1,500 yen). The offer of the shares was going to last for a month. Regarding the number of shares, the total value of SoftBank Corp. will reach $21.15 billion, which would be the second-largest IPO ever made. In December 2018, SoftBank invested in ParkJockey. The startup attempts to monetize parking lots. After the investment round, general valuation of the ParkJockey reached $1 billion. In December 2018, SoftBank announced its intention to invest $1 billion on ride-hailing startup Grab. Some sources said that the total amount of investment could reach $1.5 billion.

=== 2019–2021 ===
On 25 September 2019, Softbank Robotics launched Whiz robotic vacuum cleaner in Singapore. In September 2019, WeWork's IPO was canceled. In December 2019, Softbank sold its interest in dog-walking startup Wag at a loss. Tadashi Yanai, Fast Retailing's CEO and Japan's richest man at the time, left the board after 18 years. In November 2019, it was announced that Line Corp. and Z Holdings were going to be a new subsidiary under Naver Corporation and SoftBank Group, their respective owners. The closing was delayed until March 2021 due to COVID-19.

In January 2020, multiple Softbank-funded startups started cutting their staff, including Getaround, Oyo, Rappi, Katerra and Zume. In February 2020, Elliott Management, an activist hedge fund, bought a $2.5 billion stake in Softbank and pushed for restructuring and more transparency, especially regarding its Vision Fund. Consequently, plans for a second Vision Fund were pushed back.

In March 2020, SoftBank announced that it was launching an emergency ¥4.5tn ($41bn) asset sale to fund a share buyback and debt reduction. The effort was initiated by Son in order to stem a collapse in the company’s share price due to the pandemic, "This programme will be the largest share buyback and will result in the largest increase in cash balance in the history of SBG [SoftBank Group], reflecting the firm and unwavering confidence we have in our business.". After the programme was unveiled, Softbank share price rose almost 19%. The program included a plan to repurchase ¥2tn of its shares in addition to the ¥500bn buyback it promised 10 days prior. Combined, SoftBank would be repurchasing 45% of its stock.

On 1 April 2020, Sprint completed its merger of Sprint Corporation and T-Mobile US, which was majority-owned by Deutsche Telekom, leaving T-Mobile the parent company. The merger also led to Softbank holding 24% of the new T-Mobile's shares, while 43% of shares are held by Deutsche Telekom. The remaining 33% will be held by others. In May 2020, Alibaba's co-founder and former CEO Jack Ma resigned from the board.

In July 2020, SoftBank announced that it was considering selling or IPOing British chip designer Arm Holdings, which has been in a feud with the Chinese over control of its local subsidiary, but it did not have the majority ownership due to a decision made by Softbank to sell off the stake to the local partner. For Q2 of 2020, the company's revenues were $12 billion. The firm announced that it would be arranging a new fund worth $555 million. The fund will be used to invest in various companies, including Amazon, Apple and Facebook. In September 2020, SoftBank Vision Fund 2 led a $100 million Series C round in Biofourmis. Also in September 2020, Softbank was identified as the Nasdaq whale, where it bought stock options valued in the billions, betting on higher prices for the biggest technology companies. That month, SoftBank sold Brightstar Corporation to Brightstar Capital Partners for an undisclosed amount. American chip design company Nvidia announced plans on 13 September 2020, to acquire ARM from SoftBank, pending regulatory approval, for a value of US $40 billion in stock and cash. This would become the largest semiconductor acquisition to date. SoftBank Group would retain a 10% share in the company, while ARM would maintain its headquarters in Cambridge. But this deal collapsed due to regulatory hurdles. In December 2020, Hyundai Motor Group acquired an 80% stake of Boston Dynamics from SoftBank for approximately $880 million. SoftBank retains about 20% through an affiliate.

In January 2021, SoftBank sold $2 billion in Uber Technologies shares through affiliate firm SB Cayman. In March 2021, SoftBank made a record $36.99 billion profit from its Vision Fund unit and investment gains via the public market debut of Coupang. SoftBank Group's net profit was $45.88 billion (¥4.99 trillion). It was the largest recorded annual profit by a Japanese company in history. The same month, Softbank's Vision Fund 2 announced investment in the eToro SPAC merger PIPE of $650 million. In April 2021, Softbank announced plans to acquire a 40% stake in AutoStore for $2.8 billion and in July 2021, it announced it would invest $870 million in the Korean hotel booking platform Yanolja. In May 2021, Softbank stated it would sell SB Energy India to Adani Green Energy, valuing the unit at $3.5 billion. The sale is speculated to mark a shift in the company's trajectory, moving away from investments in solar energy towards companies dealing with artificial intelligence. Later that month, Bloomberg reported that Vision Fund could go public via a $300 million SPAC in 2021, listing in Amsterdam. In July 2021, Softbank announced that it would acquire the Yahoo Japan brand from Verizon Communications for $1.6 billion. Also in July, SoftBank invested $100 million in insurance tech company Ethos Technologies. In August 2021, Son said he would begin to make personal investments alongside Softbank Group's Vision Fund 2.

=== 2022–present ===
In August 2022, Softbank said that it sold its entire Uber holdings in April–July 2022. It was also reported that Softbank exited Opendoor in that quarter. Five years after Masayoshi Son’s $100 billion fund entered the financial world to much fanfare, Softbank’s venture firm was crumbling and on the verge of collapse. Its large venture vehicles struggled badly, performing in the bottom of the asset class, and many of Son’s closest associates in the effort had departed from the company. In 2022, SoftBank Group posted a gain of more than US $34 billion from selling down its stake in Alibaba Group Holding. This would result in its stake decreasing from 23.7 percent to 14.6 percent. SoftBank was once a major investor in Alibaba, with 48 percent of its assets in 2020, but by 2022, it had almost none. SoftBank was not directly tied to any specific funding, partnerships, or features related to subsidiaries, such as operations of its subsidiaries including the company's B2B e-commerce site.

In February 2023, Toyota Tsusho announced that it had bought the controlling interest in SB Energy, which would become a subsidiary, alongside Toyota Tsusho subsidiary Eurus Energy. In April 2023, SoftBank Group Corp. announced it was selling to a Singapore-based company run by Masayoshi Son’s youngest brother its Korea-based early-stage venture capital arm SoftBank Ventures Asia Corp. after suffering billions of dollars in losses from failed startup bets. In May 2023, the SoftBank Group announced that losses from the SoftBank Vision Fund had widened 70 percent to a record $32 billion from a year ago. In another divestiture of assets, SoftBank Group also sold the stake in Fortress Investment Group to Mubadala and Fortress' management. SoftBank Group's Arm filed for an IPO on 21 August 2023 on the Nasdaq. A few days earlier, SoftBank bought back the 25% stake from Vision Fund for around $16 billion, valuing Arm at over $64 billion. Arm went public on 14 September 2023 raising $4.87 billion at a $54.5 billion valuation, with SoftBank continuing to own 90.6% of the company following the offering. In December 2023, telecommunication and networking company SoftBank Corp, a subsidiary of SoftBank Group Corp, paid $513 million for a controlling stake in Irish technology company Cubic Telecom, in a deal that will net the company’s founders and its private backers a multimillion-euro payout.

In May 2024, Softbank launched a joint venture with healthcare technology company Tempus AI. The aim of the venture was to provide precision medical services in Japan by utilising AI. On 27 June 2024, Bloomberg reported that SoftBank has invested in the AI search startup Perplexity AI, valuing the company at $3 billion. Perplexity AI, known for its advanced artificial intelligence technology, aims to revolutionize online search experiences. This investment aligns with SoftBank's ongoing strategy to support innovative AI companies, highlighting Perplexity AI's potential in the tech industry. The funding is expected to accelerate the startup's growth and development, further enhancing its AI capabilities and market reach.

In December 2024, it was reported by CNBC that Softbank plans to invest $100 billion in the US over the next 4 years, with funding coming from various sources controlled by Softbank, including the Vision Fund, capital projects or chipmaker Arm Holdings. The investment is said to create 100,000 jobs focused on artificial intelligence and related infrastructure.

In January 2025, SoftBank Group, Oracle Corporation, MGX, OpenAI, and other partners established The Stargate Project as a cooperative venture aimed at building AI infrastructure in the US. With an estimated $500 billion in investment, the program seeks to generate 100,000 new jobs in the US by 2029.

In February 2025, SoftBank announced a joint venture with OpenAI called SB OpenAI Japan which would develop "Advanced Enterprise AI" called "Crystal Intelligence." SoftBank would spend $3 billion annually to deploy OpenAI solutions across SoftBank companies. OpenAI and SoftBank also agreed to establish a joint venture with 50:50 ownership called SB OpenAI Japan which would "serve as a springboard for introducing AI agents tailored to the unique needs of Japanese enterprises."

In March 2025, SoftBank entered into an agreement to acquire Ampere Computing, a company that produces energy-efficient and high-performance processors meant to enable next-generation cloud computing and artificial intelligence (AI). This was a $6.5 billion transaction that completed in late November 2025.

On April 23, 2025, Cantor Equity Partners, a SPAC announced a merger with Twenty One (XXI), a bitcoin acquisition company. SoftBank will own a 25% stake in the business led by stablecoin issuer Tether and bitcoin exchange Bitfinex. XXI's stated mission is "to accumulate Bitcoin and grow ownership per share." The newly formed company is targeting to go public with 42,000 bitcoin on its balance sheet contributed by its investors.

In October 2025, SoftBank Group announced an agreement to acquire the ABB Robotics division from the Swiss industrial technology company ABB for an enterprise value of US$5.375 billion, replacing ABB’s earlier plan to spin off the unit. The transaction is expected to close in mid-to-late 2026, subject to regulatory approvals and customary closing conditions. ABB stated it expects a non-operational pre-tax book gain of approximately US$2.4 billion and net cash proceeds of around US$5.3 billion, after transaction costs, with separation expenses estimated at about US$200 million. Upon completion, ABB will treat the Robotics division as discontinued operations and reorganize certain automation business segments. SoftBank chairman and CEO Masayoshi Son described the acquisition as part of the company’s strategy to expand into "Physical AI," combining ABB’s robotics capabilities with SoftBank’s expertise in artificial intelligence and next-generation computing.

In October 2025, SoftBank Group approved a second installment of $22.5 billion to complete its $30 billion investment in OpenAI. The investment is contingent on OpenAI completing corporate restructuring. If restructuring fails, the investment would drop to $20 billion. This was after liquidating its complete stake in Nvidia worth $5.8 billion, and redirecting capital towards OpenAI instead.

On December 29, 2025, SoftBank Group announced an agreement to acquire U.S.-based digital infrastructure investment firm DigitalBridge Group, Inc. in an all-cash transaction valued at approximately $4 billion. The deal, which would take DigitalBridge private, reflects SoftBank’s continued expansion into artificial intelligence–related infrastructure, including data centers, fiber networks, and wireless assets. DigitalBridge is expected to continue operating as an independent investment platform following the completion of the acquisition, which remains subject to regulatory approvals.

In February 2026, SoftBank Group swings profit after it invested more than US$30 billion in OpenAI, accumulating an 11 per cent stake as at December. It had also been in talks to invest as much as US$30 billion more in a round that would value the startup at about US$750 billion to US$830 billion. In March 2026, PayPay, which is backed by SoftBank Group, priced its U.S. initial public offering at $16 per share, below its targeted price range due to the U.S.-Israeli war with Iran. In May 2026, SoftBank Group announced plans to invest up to €75 billion to develop 5 gigawatts of AI data center capacity in France, stating that it would be its largest AI infrastructure investment in Europe. The first phase would involve an initial €45 billion investment to deliver 3.1 gigawatts of capacity in the Hauts-de-France region.

In November 2026, Chinese authorities prohibited SoftBank's acquisition of ABB's robotics business in China. SoftBank said it remained in discussions with ABB about the transaction.

== Institutional ownership ==
=== 2020 ===
As of 30 September 2020, SoftBank ownership is as follows:

- Masayoshi Son (21.25%)
- The Master Trust Bank of Japan investment trusts (10.25%)
- Japan Trustee Services Bank main investment trusts (5.87%)
- JPMorgan Chase (7.45%)
- Citibank (1.4%)
- The Vanguard Group (2.19%)
- Capital Group Companies (2.4%)
- Baillie Gifford (1.36%)

=== 2022 ===
By December 2022, Masayoshi Son’s stake in the company he founded had risen to 34.2% from 32.2% as of the end of September.

=== 2025 ===
As of March 31, 2025 Softbank's top shareholders were:

- Masayoshi Son (29.68%)
- The Master Trust Bank of Japan (17.15%)
- Custody Bank of Japan (7.18%)
- JP Morgan Chase Bank (2.02%)
- Government of Japan (1.89%)
- HSBC (1.80%)
- SON CORPORATION LLC (1.33%)
- State Street Bank West Client (1.31%)
- Son Assets Management, LLC (1.29%)
- State Street Bank and Trust Company (1.23%)
- Government of Norway (1.12%)

== Business units ==
SoftBank’s corporate portfolio includes various subsidiary and affiliate companies such as SoftBank BB, a broadband operator based in Japan; IDC Frontier, which specializes in data centers; and SB Creative, a publishing company. SBI Group refers to a financial services company based in Japan. The company started as a subsidiary of SoftBank in 1999. Ymobile Corporation refers to another subsidiary of SoftBank specializing in telecommunications, formed in 2014. In 2010, SoftBank created a subsidiary named Wireless City Planning (WCP), which coordinates TD-LTE development across Japan.

SoftBank also operated SoftBank Capital, a US-based venture capital firm founded in 1995, which was closed to new investments in 2015 and subsequently replaced by the SoftBank Vision Fund as the group's primary investment vehicle.

The group also has a professional baseball team known as the Fukuoka SoftBank Hawks, which won the 2025 Japan Series.

The company used to operate in the eco-power industry through its subsidiary SB Energy until it was divested from the company. The company also has an operating division known as PayPay, which is widely used for mobile payments in Japan and was planning an initial public offering as of early 2026.

It maintains a major stake in LY Corporation, a Japanese internet conglomerate established on October 1, 2023, through the merger of Z Holdings and its subsidiaries, including Line Corporation and Yahoo Japan Corporation. SoftBank Corp. and Naver Corporation each hold a 50% stake in A Holdings Corporation, which controls approximately 64% of LY Corporation.

Other major holdings include SoftBank Corp., the group's principal telecommunications subsidiary and third-largest wireless carrier in Japan; the SoftBank Vision Fund (SVF1 and SVF2), the world's largest technology-focused venture capital funds; and Arm Holdings (approximately 87%), the British semiconductor intellectual property company that completed an initial public offering on the Nasdaq in September 2023.

By the end of 2025, SoftBank had completed a cumulative investment of approximately US$34.6 billion in OpenAI, acquiring an approximately 11% stake and becoming its third-largest shareholder after the OpenAI non-profit foundation and Microsoft.

SoftBank has largely or fully divested several former holdings, including Alibaba Group (sold by mid-2024). SoftBank withdrew its investment from Alibaba to limit exposure during the Chinese regulatory crackdowns and increase its cash reserves during a global tech market downfall. The decision was not only driven by China's technology crackdown which hurt Alibaba's valuation and raised its regulatory risk, but also by SoftBank's need to rebuild cash reserves after severe Vision Fund losses and a global technology downturn. SoftBank described the move as more of a defense decision. In 2022, SoftBank sold its own stake, realizing a $34 billion gain while reducing ownership from 23.7% to 14.6%. By January 2024, SoftBank cleared its 23-year-old holding, booking an $8.5 billion gain. The company also signaled CEO Masayoshi Son's lack of interest in China tech, as he was showing more interest in AI investments, with Alibaba dropping from 48% to almost zero by 2024. In addition to this, Alibaba also faced a negative impact from China's tech industry as a result of regulations that started in 2020. T-Mobile US (stake reduced and largely sold by 2025 to fund OpenAI investments), Uber (fully exited in 2022), WeWork (which filed for bankruptcy in November 2023), Boston Dynamics (sold to Hyundai in 2021), and Fortress Investment Group (sold to Mubadala in 2023). Other current holdings through the Vision Funds include OYO (hospitality), Ping An Insurance, InMobi (digital advertising), ParkJockey, DiDi (ride-hailing, China), Ola (ride-hailing, India), and Tokopedia (e-commerce, Indonesia).

=== SoftBank Corp. ===
SoftBank Corp. (ソフトバンク株式会社, SofutoBanku Kabushikigaisha) is SoftBank's telecommunications subsidiary, providing both mobile and fixed-line services. It was called SoftBank Mobile until July 2015, when the Group merged SoftBank BB Corp., SoftBank Telecom Corp. and Ymobile Corporation to reflect its fixed-line and ISP operations.

=== J-PHONE ===
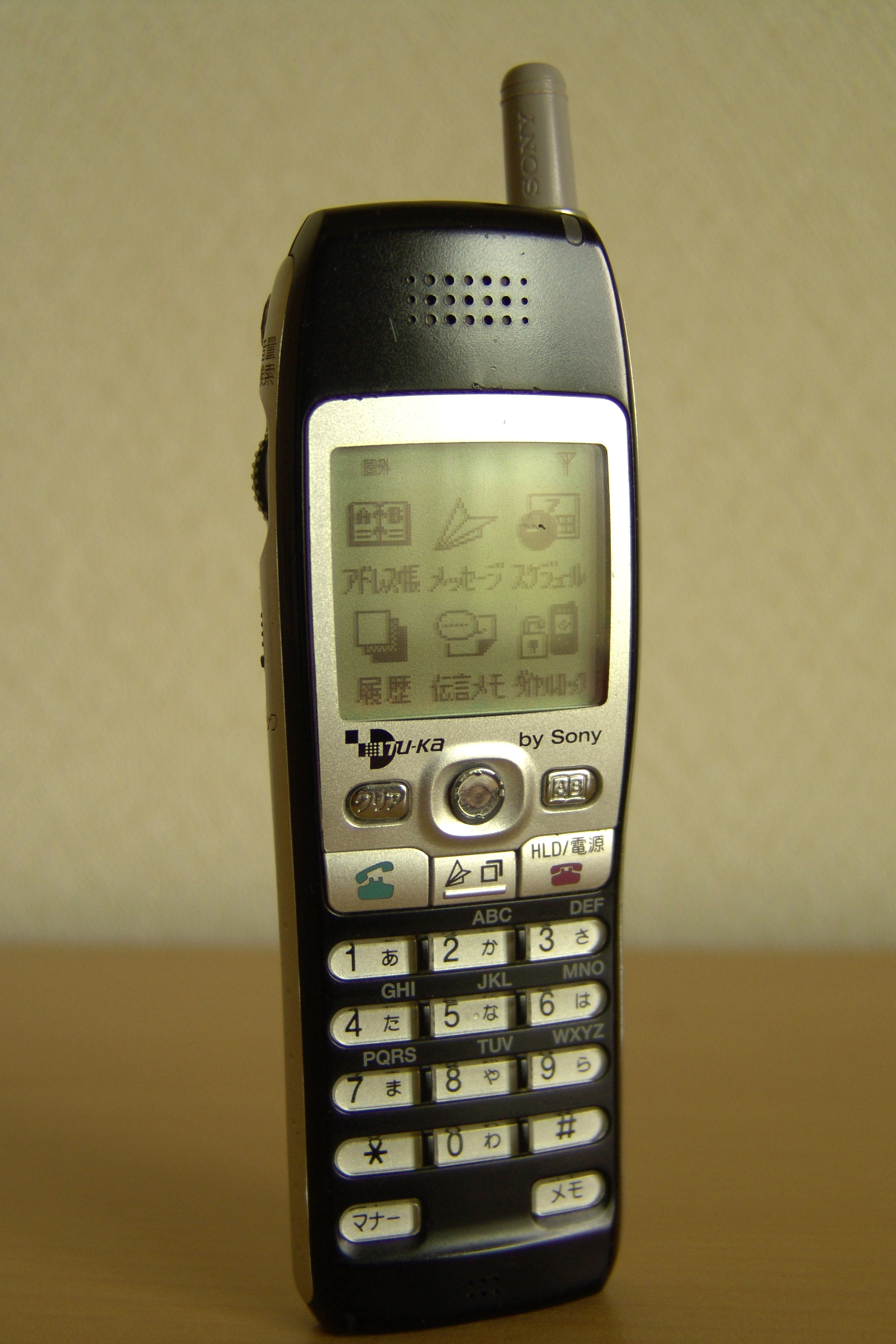
Sony TH291 cellular phone for the Digital Tu-Ka operator

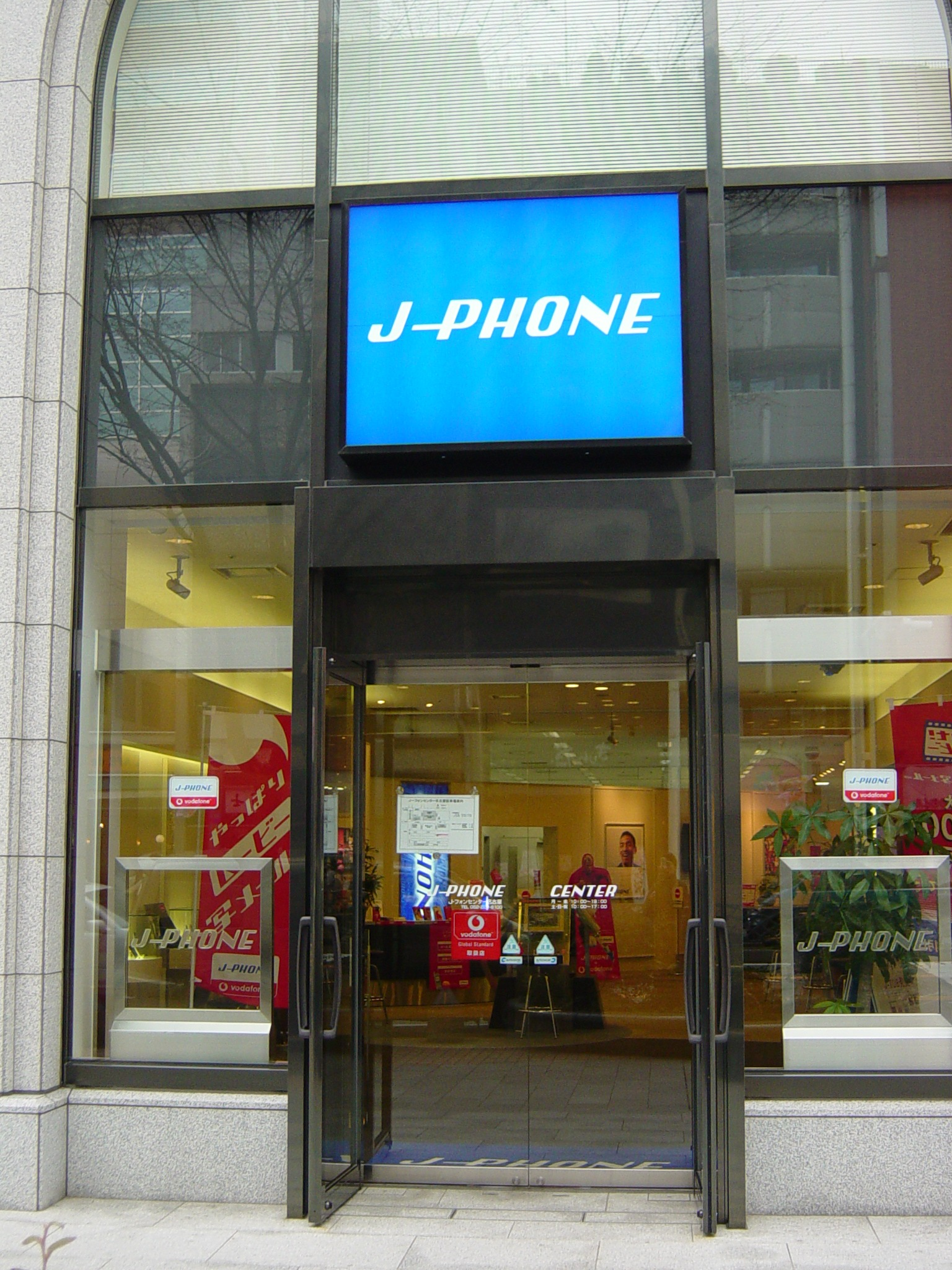
J-PHONE store in Nagoya in 2003

SoftBank's mobile communications arm began with the formation of Japan Telecom in 1984. The Digital Phone Group (デジタルホン, DPG, three local companies) mobile phone division was formed in 1994, and J-PHONE Co., Ltd. (J-フォン) was formed in 1999 by the DGP/ Digital TU-KA Group merger (DTG, six local companies, not to be confused with TU-KA). Japan Telecom owned a stake of 45.1%.

J-PHONE grew steadily for a decade by introducing new services and enhancements such as SkyWalker for PDC, SkyMelody ringtone download, the Sha-Mail picture mail introduced following camera phones developed by SHARP, the mobile multimedia data service J-Sky modeled after NTT DoCoMo's i-mode, and advanced Java services based on JSCL, modeled after NTT DoCoMo's DoJa based i-appli.

=== Vodafone ===
In October 2001, the British mobile phone group Vodafone increased its share to 66.7% of Japan Telecom and 69.7% of J-Phone. On 1 October 2003, the company's name and the service brand changed to Vodafone, while the division was called Vodafone K.K. or Vodafone Japan.

However, in January 2005, Vodafone Japan lost 58,700 customers and in February 2005 lost 53,200 customers, while competitors NTT DoCoMo gained 184,400 customers, while Au by KDDI gained 163,700, and Willcom gained 35,000. While as of February 2005, DoCoMo's FOMA 3G service had attracted 10 million subscribers and KDDI's 3G service had attracted over 17 million subscribers, Vodafone's 3G service only attracted 527,300 subscribers. Vodafone 3G failed to attract subscribers because Vodafone reduced investments in 3G services in Japan in 2002/3; handsets did not fully match the needs and preferences of Japanese customers. At the end of February 2005, Vodafone Japan had 15.1 million customers. By the end of October 2005, the number of subscribers had fallen below 15M. During the same period, NTT DoCoMo gained 1.65 million customers, and KDDI/AU gained 1.82 million customers. Vodafone-Japan had only 4.8% of Japan's 3G market.

Vodafone changed the name of its multimedia data services from J-Sky to Vodafone live! and used J-Sky's principles, technologies, and business models to introduce the WAP-based Vodafone live! in Vodafone's other markets. At the end of February 2005, Vodafone live! had 12.907 million subscribers in Japan. By the end of October 2005, the number of Vodafone live! subscribers had fallen by 138,000.

In March 2006, Vodafone began discussing the sale of the Vodafone Japan unit to SoftBank. Vodafone was unable to satisfy customers. Handsets had user interfaces that differed too much from the Japanese interface and lacked competitive features.

=== SoftBank Mobile ===
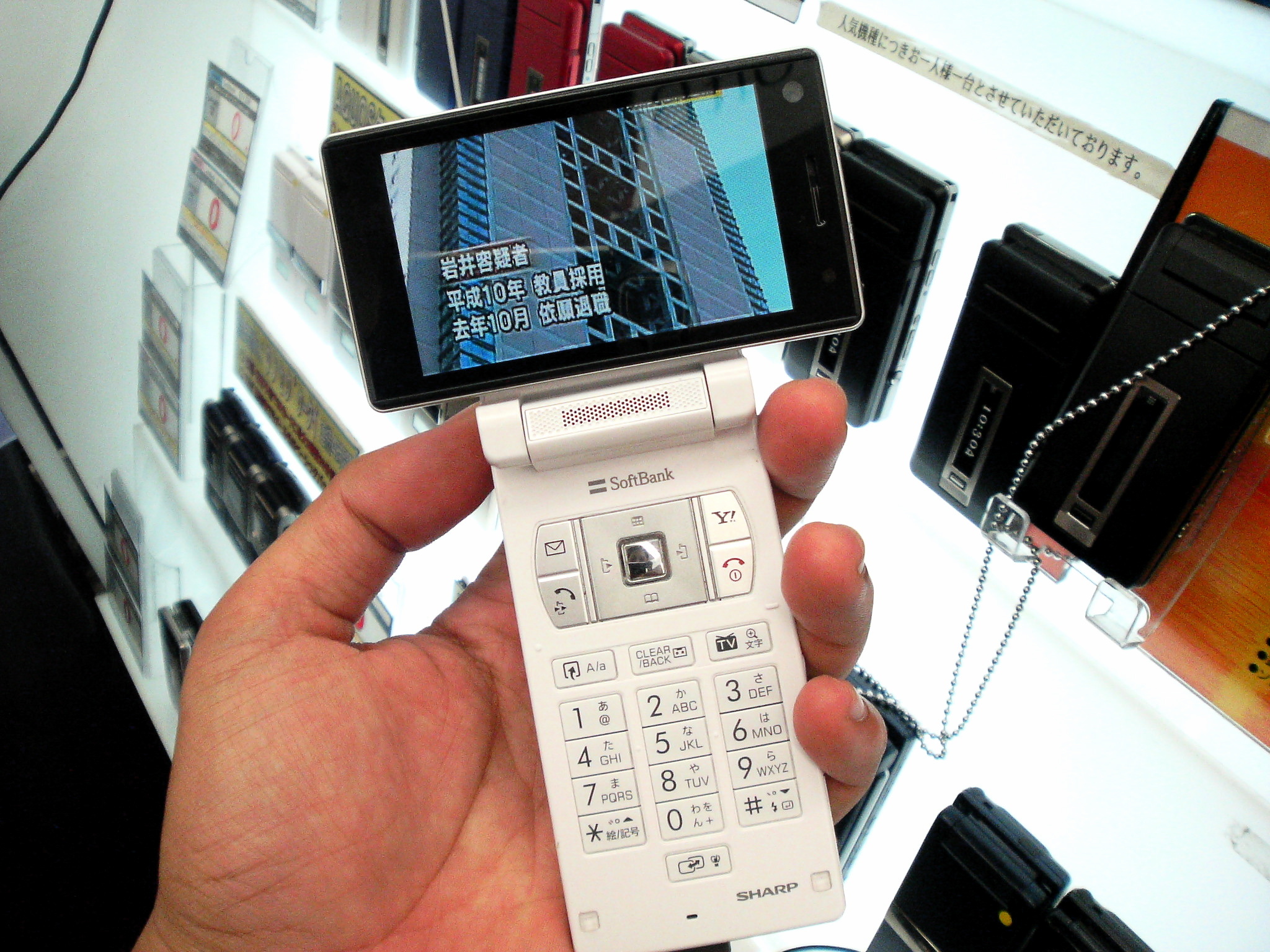
Television broadcast on a 2007 Sharp phone on SoftBank

On 17 March 2006, Vodafone Group announced it had agreed to sell Vodafone Japan to SoftBank for about US$15.1 billion. On 18 May 2006, the unit was renamed "SoftBank Mobile Corp.", effective 1 October 2006.

On 4 June 2008, SoftBank Mobile announced a partnership with Apple and brought the iPhone (3G) to Japan later in 2008. SoftBank Mobile was the only official carrier of the iPhone in Japan until the release of iPhone 4S in 2011, when au by KDDI began to offer it.

=== Technology ===
SoftBank Corp.'s mobile network operates W-CDMA (UMTS 3G) network ("SoftBank 3G"). SoftBank's 3G network is compatible with UMTS and supports transparent global roaming for UMTS subscribers from other countries.

=== Timeline ===
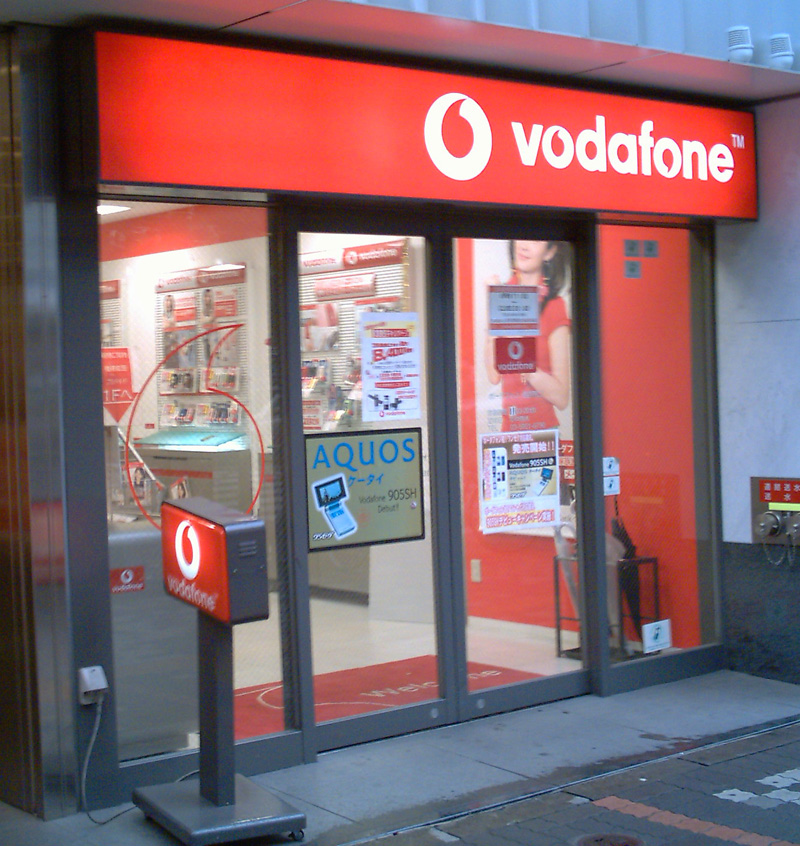
Vodafone store in Ikebukuro, Tokyo, 2006

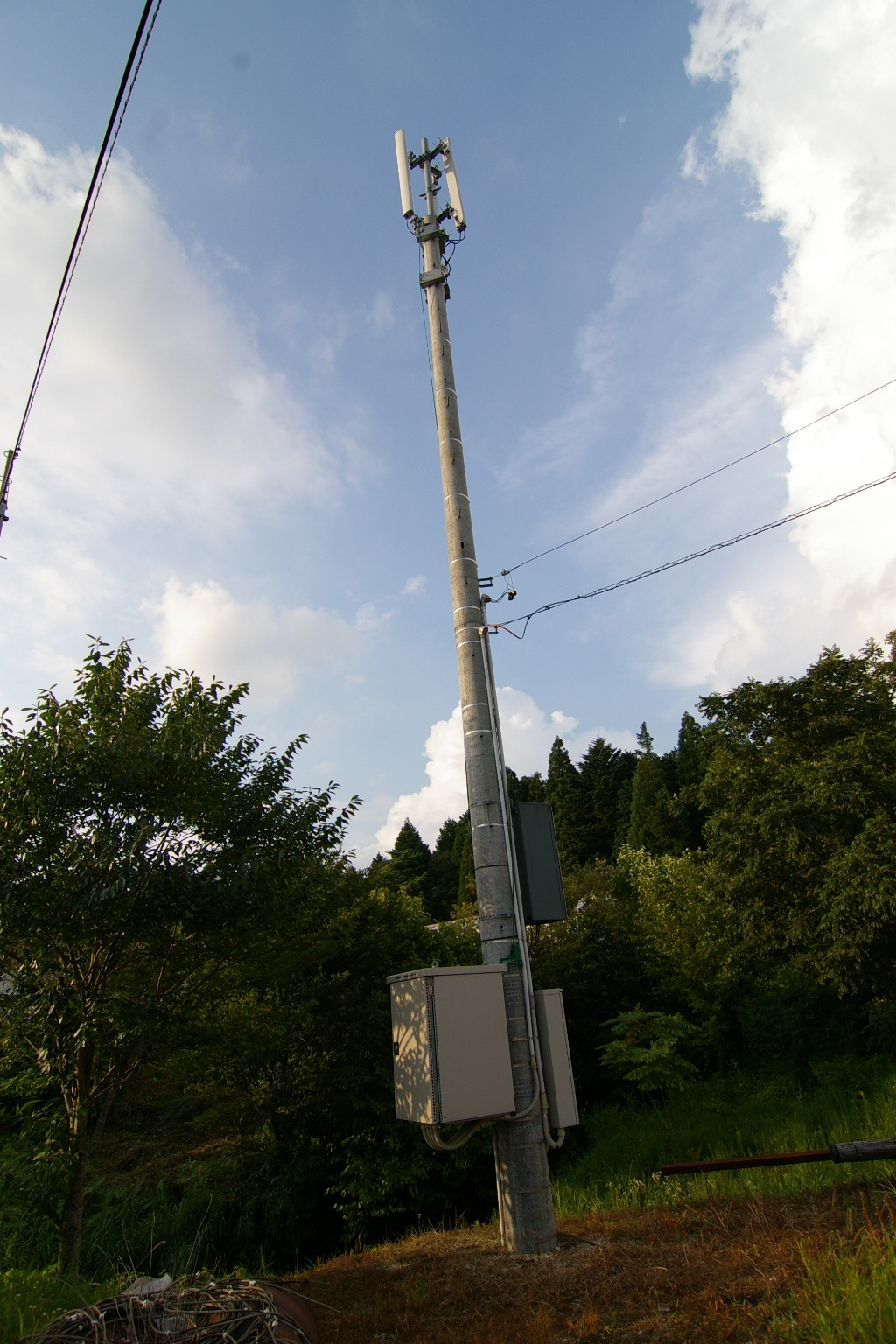
A SoftBank mobile cell tower in Nakatsugawa, Gifu

- 1981: SoftBank Corp. (currently SoftBank Group Corp.) Japan (Yombancho, Chiyoda-ku, Tokyo) established. Commenced operations as a distributor of packaged software
- 1984: Japan Telecom was founded.
- 1986: Japan Telecom launches leased circuit services.
- 1986: Railway Telecommunication established.
- 1989: Railway Telecommunication merges with Japan Telecom.
- 1991: Tokyo Digital Phone established.
- 1994: J-Phone starts PDC cellular service in the 1.5 GHz band, 10 MHz bandwidth.
- 1997: J-Phone launches SkyWalker SMS service designed by Aldiscon and Ericsson for PDC
- 1998: J-Phone launches SkyMelody ringtone download service
- 1999: J-Phone launches J-Sky wireless Internet service ten months after NTT DoCoMo's i-mode, which was launched in February 1999.
- 2000: J-Phone launches Sha-Mail (写メール) picture messaging service using the world's first camera phones developed by SHARP
- 2001: J-Phone launches Java service with JSCL library
- 2002: J-Phone launches W-CDMA 3G service for the first time
- 2002: Company name was changed to Japan Telecom Holdings. The fixed-line telecommunications business was also separated to found a new Japan Telecom.
- 2003: J-Phone company name is changed to Vodafone K.K., and J-Sky name is changed to Vodafone live!. Vodafone launches a Japan-nationwide Beckham campaign
- 2003: Company name was changed to Vodafone Holdings K.K.
- 2004: Vodafone K.K. merges with Vodafone Holdings K.K. and the company name is changed to Vodafone K.K.
- 2004: Vodafone relaunches the 3G services in Japan a second time offering mobile phone handsets designed primarily for the European markets
- 2005: Vodafone changes management and relaunches 3G services in Japan a third time
- 2006: Vodafone officially announced it had agreed to sell Vodafone Japan (Vodafone K.K.) to SoftBank for a total of 1.75 trillion Japanese yen (approx US$15.1 billion) in one of the largest M&A transactions in Japan to date
- 2006: SoftBank and Vodafone K.K. jointly announced, that the name of the company will be changed to a "new, easy-to-understand and familiar" company name and brand. Masayoshi Son became CEO and Representative Director of Vodafone K.K.
- 2006: Headquarters moved from Atago Hills to Shiodome to integrate operations with other SoftBank group companies.
- 2006: SoftBank announced that the name of the company will be changed to "SoftBank Mobile Corp." effective 1 October 2006
- 2006: SoftBank started rebranding "Vodafone" to "SoftBank."
- 2006: Vodafone Japan company name is changed to "SoftBank Mobile Corp."
- 2008: SoftBank Mobile releases iPhone in Japan beating NTT DoCoMo
- 2008: SoftBank Mobile joins Open Handset Alliance
- 2010: Softbank purchased 100% of the PHS mobile operator Willcom.
- 2012: SoftBank Mobile unveils the Pantone 5 107SH, a mobile phone with a built-in geiger counter.
- 2015: Investment in US-based Social Finance, Inc (SoFi) announced
- 2015: SoftBank Mobile was merged with SoftBank BB Corp., SoftBank Telecom Corp., and Ymobile Corporation to form a new subsidiary, SoftBank Corp., to reflect its new status of providing fixed-line and ISP operations.
- 2018: SoftBank Corp. (TSE: 9434) listed on the First Section of the Tokyo Stock Exchange On 19 December 2018.

=== Gallery ===
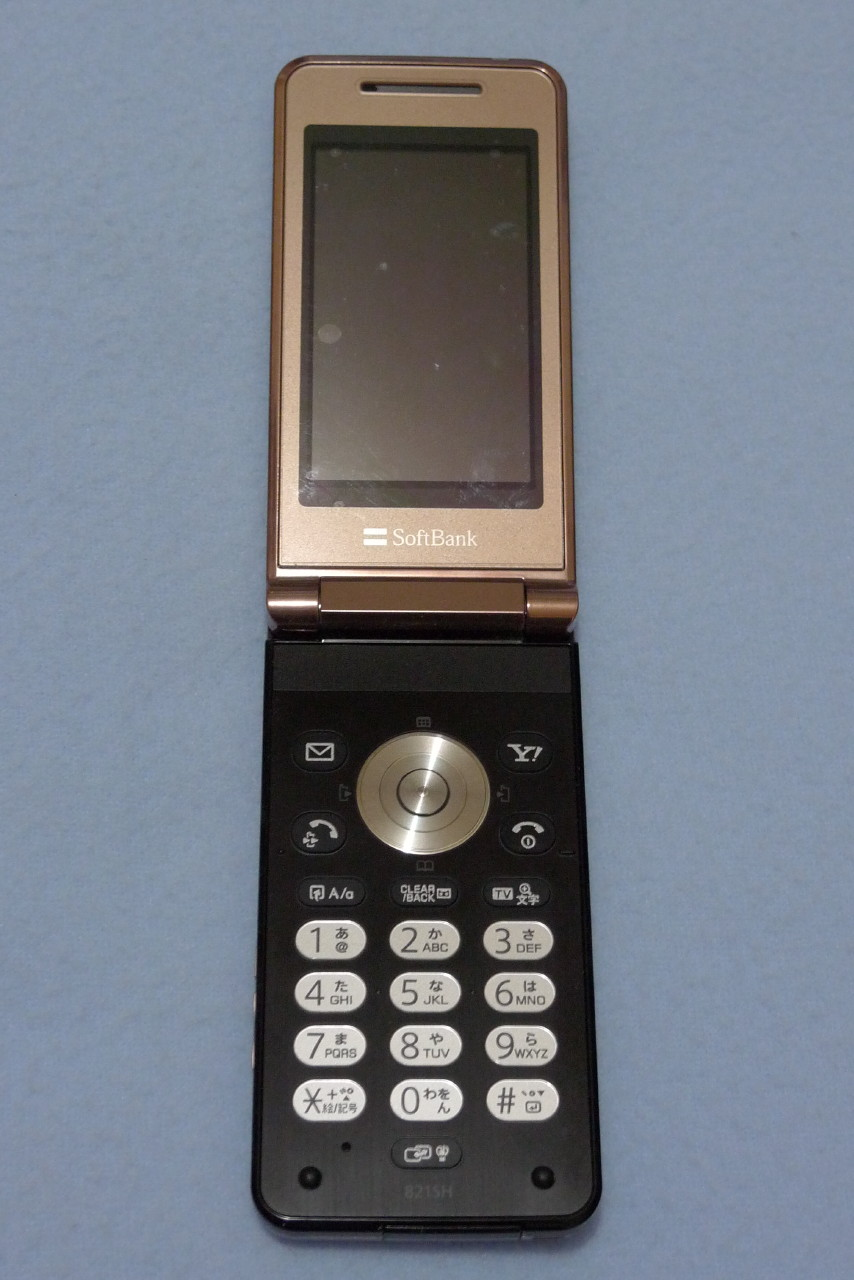
SoftBank 821SH PG

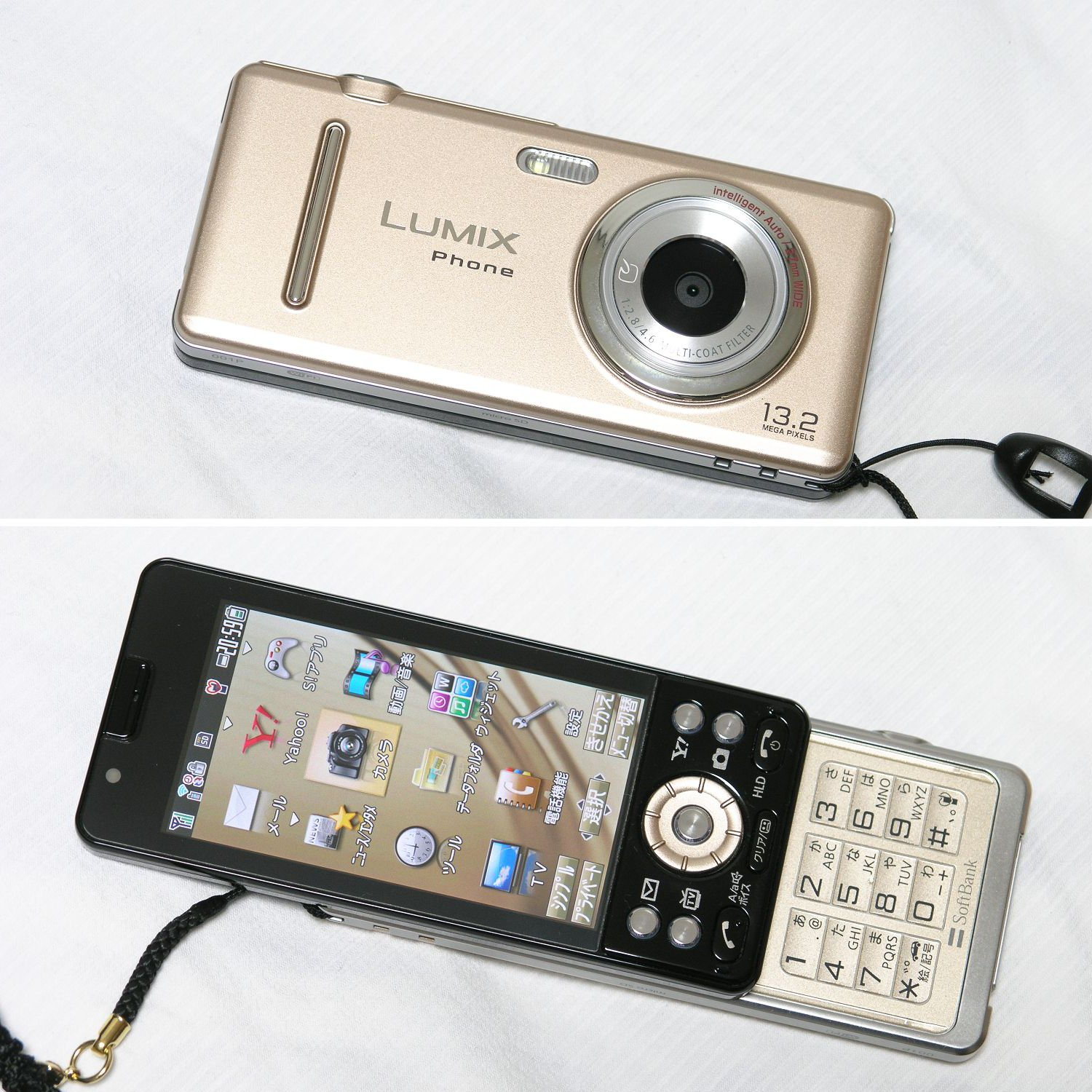
SoftBank 001P by Panasonic

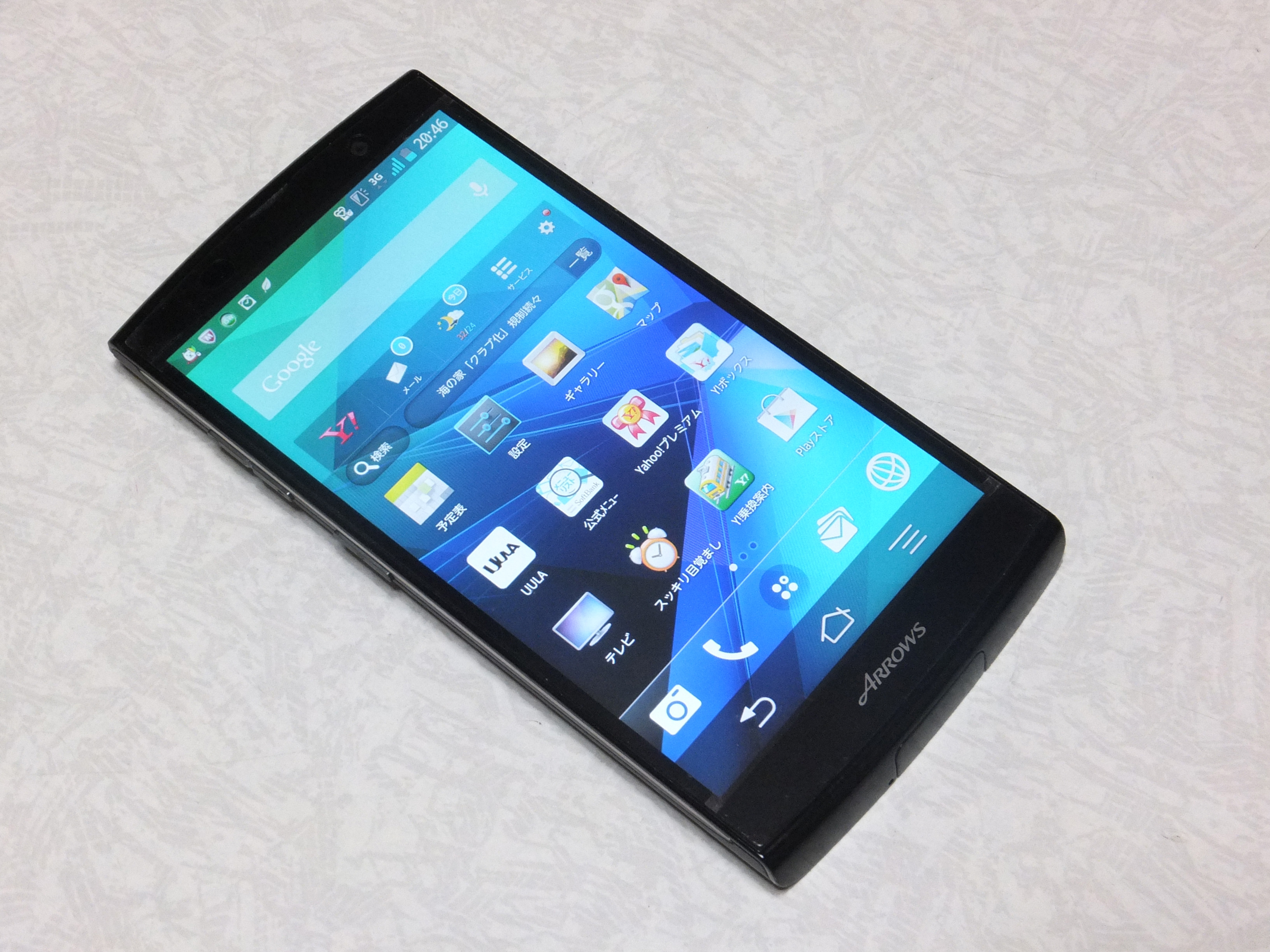
SoftBank A202F by Fujitsu

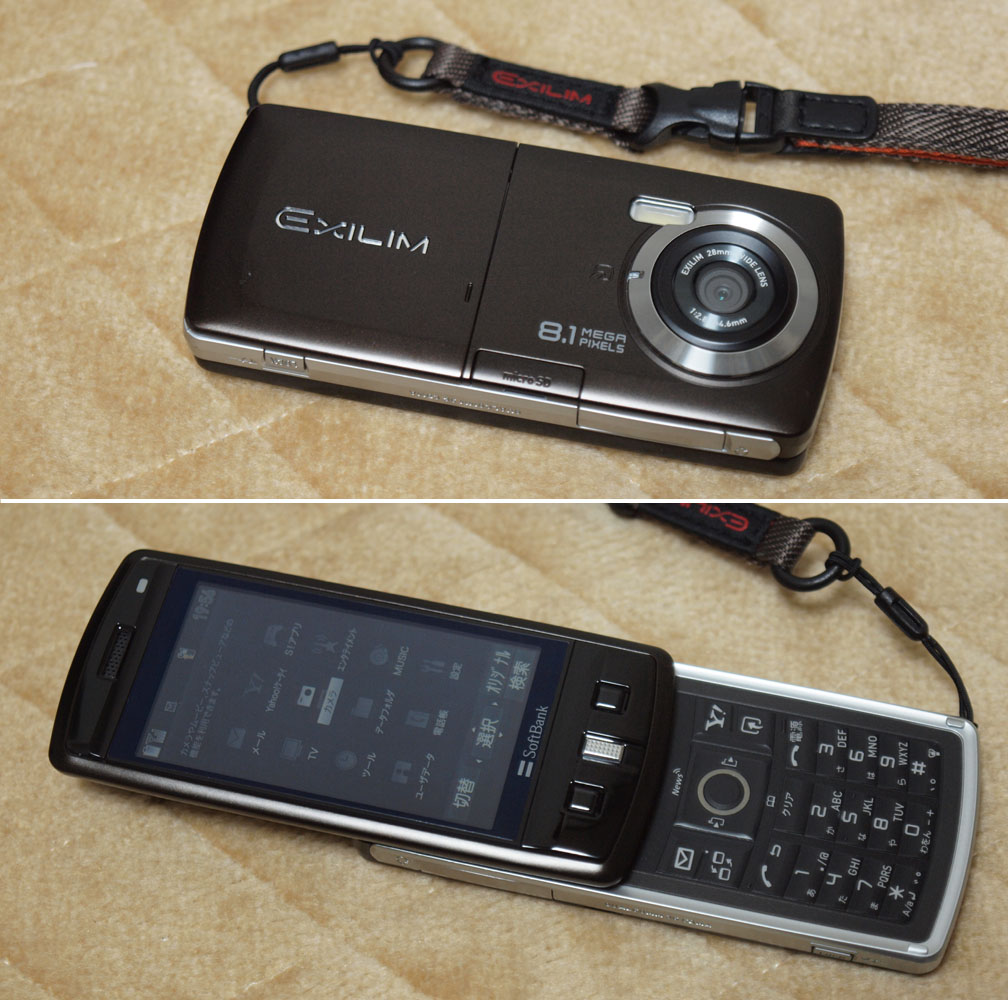
SoftBank 930CA by Casio

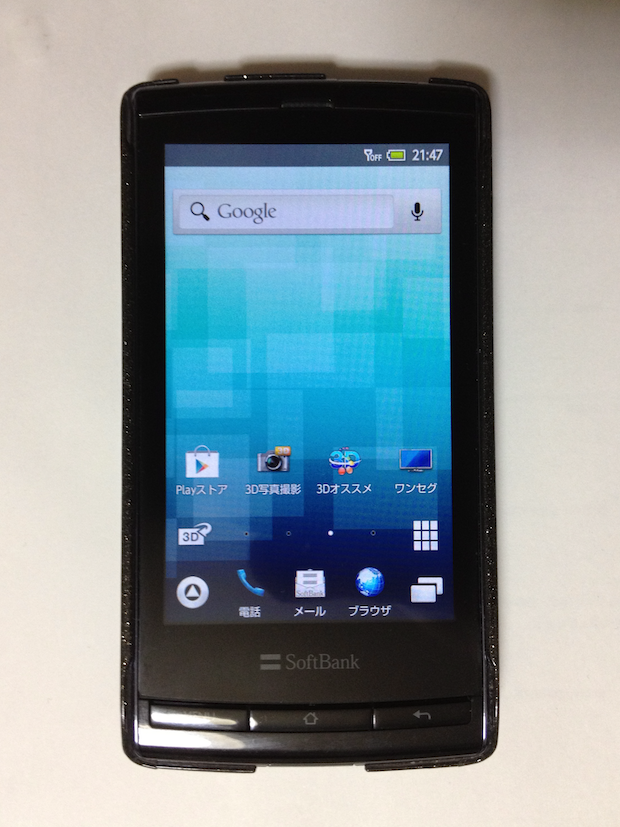
SoftBank 003SH

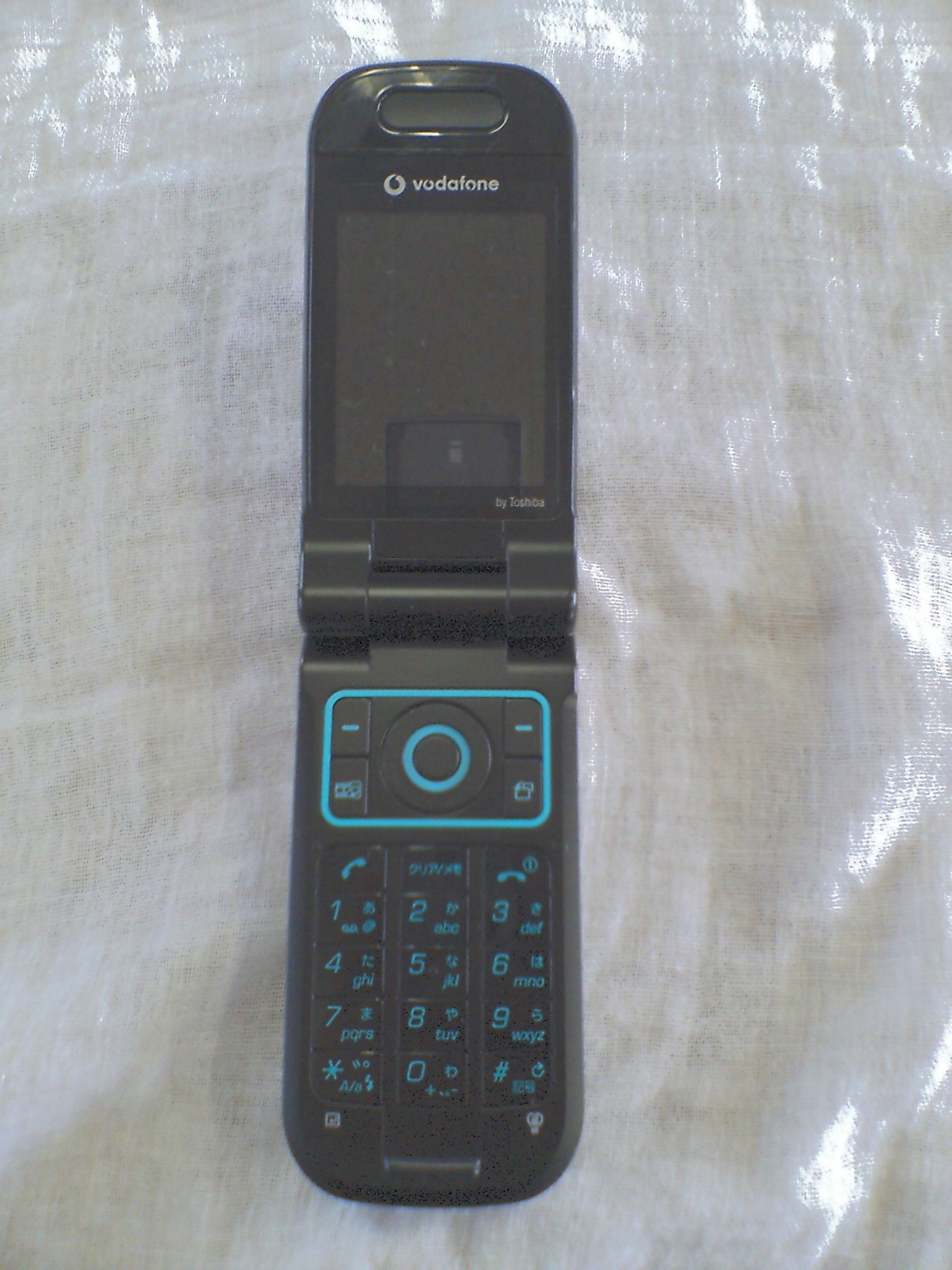
Vodafone 803T by Toshiba

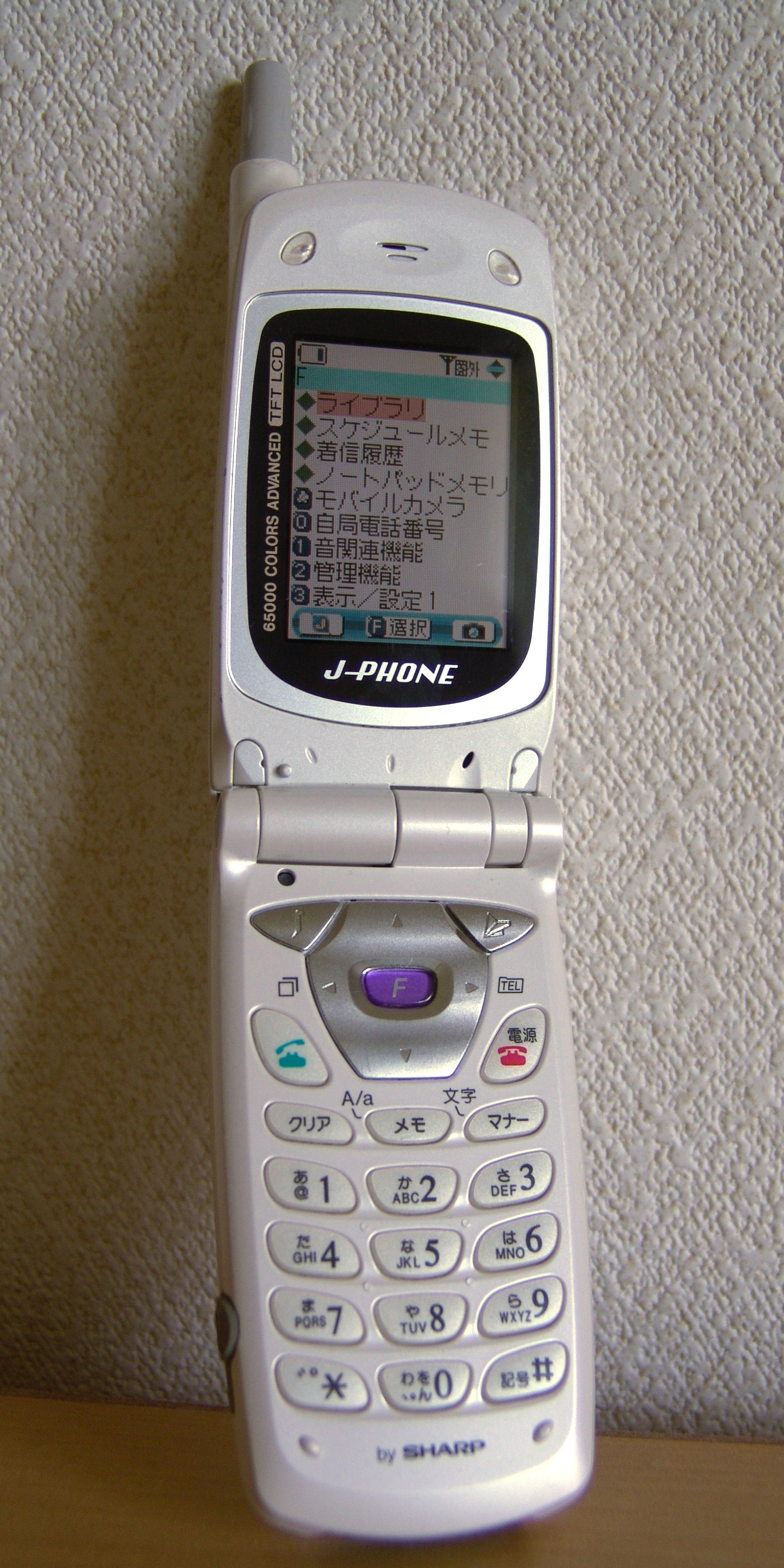
J-PHONE J-SH07 by Sharp (2001)

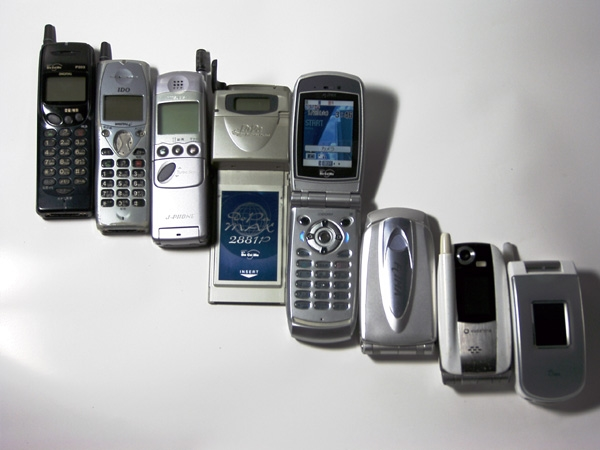
An evolution of J-PHONE and Vodafone cell phones, 1997–2004

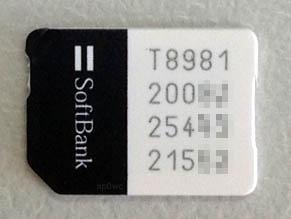
A SoftBank USIM card

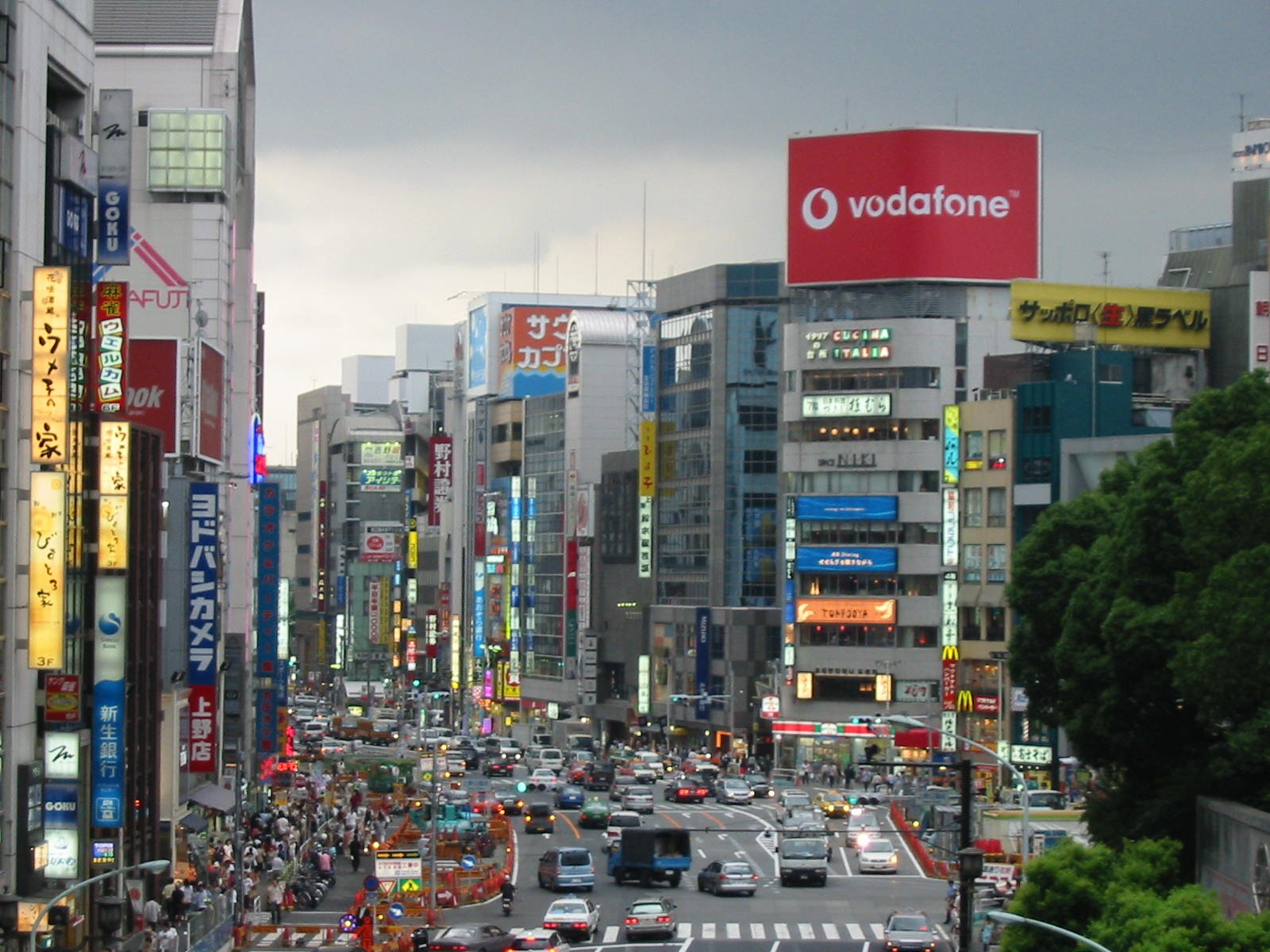
View of Taitō, Tokyo, with a large Vodafone sign in the background (2004)

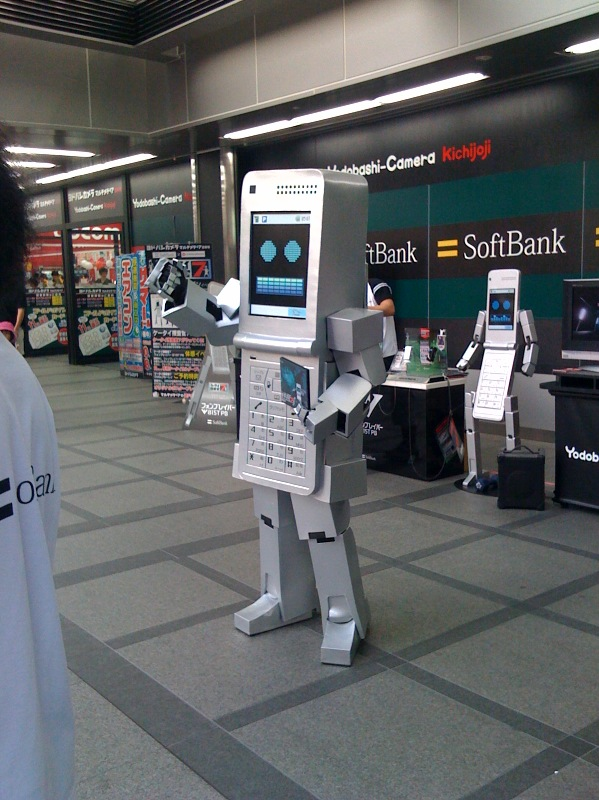
Mobile Blazer (2008)

== Media ==
In 1999, Softbank launched the website ITmedia.

== Marketing ==
Since May 2006, SoftBank's telecommunications marketing and commercials have principally revolved around "Otosan", the canine patriarch of the otherwise human "Shirato" family. "Otosan" translates to father, and the character, a Hokkaido dog, indeed acts as the father of the family, along with the son "Kojiro" (starred by Dante Carver), mom "Masako" (Kanako Higuchi), and daughter "Aya" (Aya Ueto). The advertising series proved to be popular: CM Research Center ranked the Otousan adverts as the most popular in Japan between 2007 and 2012, based on monthly surveys of 3,000 randomly selected adults.

SoftBank partnered with the Ingress augmented reality game, supporting the branded "SoftBank Ultra Link" in-game item.

=== Sponsorship ===
SoftBank bought a "team" for the America's Cup. The team was named SoftBank Team Japan, and Yanmar came on board. SoftBank Team Japan raced in the 2017 races held in Bermuda. The team members come from various backgrounds, most of whom were not Japanese.

The company was the official jersey sponsor of the Japanese national basketball team at the official 2017 Asian Basketball Championship in Lebanon as well as the 2019 FIBA World Cup.

SoftBank has also owned the Fukuoka SoftBank Hawks, a Japanese professional baseball team based in Fukuoka, since 2005. The SoftBank logo appears on the jersey, and the team has won seven Japan Series championships under SoftBank, all of which came between 2011 and 2020.

== Baby bonus ==
In 2015, SoftBank, along with some other companies in Japan, offered a baby bonus for employees who have children. The payments range from 50,000 yen for the first child to 5 million yen for the fifth child.

== Vision fund investments ==
SoftBank Investment Advisers oversees SoftBank's Vision Fund, created in 2017, which invests in emerging technologies like artificial intelligence, robotics and the internet of things. It intended to develop a portfolio of 125 AI companies. According to the fund and Son, it also invested in companies to revolutionize real estate, transportation, and retail. Son claimed he would make personal connections with the CEOs of all companies funded by Vision Fund in order to boost synergies among them. Son’s original plans were to raise $100 billion for a new fund every few years, investing about $50 billion a year in startups. By 2023, after the launch of Vision Fund 1 and 2, the dismal performance of SoftBank’s funds had cast a shadow over the initial exuberance of both Masayoshi Son and his company regarding its huge, largely unprofitable intercorporate investments that had become the main mission, vision and purpose of the entire SoftBank Group.

== SoftBank Ventures Asia ==
SoftBank Ventures Asia (SBVA) was the global early-stage venture capital arm of the SoftBank Group The firm focused on early-stage ICT investments – including Artificial Intelligence (AI), the internet of things (IoT), and smart robotics. By October 2021, SBVA had backed more than 250 companies in 10 countries with US$1.3 billion fund under management.

SoftBank Ventures Asia (SBVA) was founded in 2000 as SoftBank Ventures Korea and began its focus on South Korean market and its early-stage ventures. SBVA’s one of the early investments in South Korea included Nexon Co, now a Korean-Japanese gaming publisher that was the largest IPO in Japan for 2011.

SoftBank Ventures Asia (SBVA) expanded its focus beyond South Korea since 2011 and made several notable investments in Southeast Asia, such as Tokopedia, an Indonesian e-commerce platform, and Carro, Singapore's used-car platform. In 2018, SBVA launched a $300m venture fund ‘China Venture Fund I’, targeting Chinese start-ups, then immediately trailed by ‘SoftBank Acceleration Fund’ with $300M the following year. With continuous investment across Asia and beyond, the company renamed itself as SoftBank Ventures Asia to reflect its broadened focus on startups in the Asia-Pacific region beyond South Korea, and opened offices in Seoul, Singapore, and Beijing.

With the company’s extended expertise in ICT investment, SBVA is aiming towards two investment themes, which were ‘technology innovation’ in AI, Robotics, Semiconductor, Mobility, and AR/VR, and ‘market innovation’ in consumer, enterprise, shared economy, healthcare, etc. SBVA created $160M ‘future innovation fund’ in March 2021, focusing on AI start-ups and made investment in AI sector including VoyagerX, AI software developer, Upstage AI, AI solution provider, and MarqVision, AI-powered intellectual property (IP) protection platform.

In April 2023, it was known that Masayoshi Son's SoftBank Group would sell its early-stage venture capital arm SoftBank Ventures Asia to Singapore-based The Edgeof, a newly formed investment firm led by Son's youngest brother, Taizo Son, as SoftBank Group grappled with steep losses in a myriad of investments made around the world. The operation raised governance concerns.

== See also ==
- List of conglomerates
- LY Corporation

== Additional sources ==
- Annual Report (PDF), JP: SoftBank, 2008, archived from the original (PDF) on 19 April 2009.
