= Kioichō, Chiyoda, Tokyo =

Kioichō 紀尾井町
- District
- Interactive map of Kioichō
- Coordinates: 35.681578°N 139.733894°E
- Country: Japan
- Region: Kantō
- Prefecture: Tokyo
- Special Ward: Chiyoda
- Neighbourhood: Kōjimachi

Population (2017)
  - Total: 452
- Time zone: UTC+9 (JST)
- Postal code: 102-0094
- Area code: 03
- Vehicle registration: 品川

Kioichō (紀尾井町) is a district located in Chiyoda, Tokyo. Once a samurai town, the name of the district is a portmanteau derived from the names of the Kii clan, the Owari clan, and the Ii clan, all of whom had residences there during the Edo era. The Hotel New Otani Tokyo, Sophia University, Yahoo! Corporation, and Shimizudani Park are located within the district.

== Education ==
Chiyoda Board of Education operates public elementary and junior high schools. Banchō Elementary School (千代田区立番町小学校) is the zoned elementary school for Kioichō. There is a freedom of choice system for junior high schools in Chiyoda Ward, and so there are no specific junior high school zones.
