= Gengo =

Japanese web-based translation platform

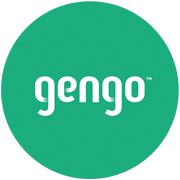
- Company type: Translation services via crowdsourcing
- Industry: Translation
- Founded: December 2008
- Founder: Robert Laing; Matthew Romaine
- Headquarters: Tokyo, Japan and San Mateo, California
- Services: Translation, API
- Parent: Lionbridge
- Website: gengo.com

Gengo is a web-based translation platform headquartered in Tokyo.

== History ==
Gengo was founded in 2008 by Matthew Romaine and Robert Laing. Prior to starting Gengo, Romaine was an audio research engineer and translator with Sony Corporation, and Laing headed Moresided, a UK-based design agency. Romaine thought of the concept for Gengo due to his experience being asked to translate documents in Japanese and English at Sony, despite originally being hired as an engineer. Prior to its early 2012 rebranding, the company was known as "myGengo."

In April 2010, the company launched their API, allowing developers to integrate Gengo’s translation platform into third-party applications, web sites and widgets.

Romaine initially served as CTO of the company. He replaced fellow co-founder Robert Laing as CEO in 2015.

In March 2018, the company launched Gengo AI, an on-demand platform that provides crowdsourced multilingual training data to machine learning developers.

In January 2019, Gengo and Gengo AI were acquired by Lionbridge Technologies.

== Funding ==
The company's initial $750,000 seed investment round concluded in September 2010. Investors included Dave McClure of 500 Startups, last.fm founder Felix Miller, Delicious founder Joshua Schachter, Brian Nelson (CEO at Japan-based ValueCommerce), Pageflakes co-founder Christoph Janz, Benjamin Joffe (CEO at China-based Plus Eight Star), and a number of Japanese angel investors. This was followed by a further seed funding round of around $1,000,000 in mid-2011.

A $5.25 million Series A round led by Atomico and joined by 500 Startups ended in September 2011, followed by an early 2013 Series B investment of $12 million led by Intel Capital.

The company announced its $5.4 million Series C round funding in April 2015.

== See also ==
- designclue
