= Ichi the Witch =

Japanese manga series

- First tankōbon volume cover

魔男のイチ (Madan no Ichi)
- Genre: Fantasy
- Manga
- Written by: Osamu Nishi
- Illustrated by: Shiro Usazaki
- Published by: Shueisha
- English publisher: NA: Viz Media
- Imprint: Jump Comics
- Magazine: Weekly Shōnen Jump
- Original run: September 9, 2024 – present
- Volumes: 10
- icon

Ichi the Witch (Japanese: 魔男のイチ, Hepburn: Madan no Ichi) is a Japanese manga series written by Osamu Nishi and illustrated by Shiro Usazaki. It began serialization in Shueisha's Weekly Shōnen Jump magazine in September 2024.

== Plot ==
The series takes place in a world where monsters composed of magic called Majiks exist. Specialized hunters called Witches can obtain magic from them after performing a trial, but it is thought only women can become witches. A young boy called Ichi, who lives in Druid Mountain and hunts for a living, defeats a Majik, and ends up being the first male witch.

== Characters ==
=== Team Desscaras ===
Ichi (イチ)
Voiced by: Kikunosuke Toya (voiced comic)
Ichi is a feral hunter raised on Druid Mountain after being abandoned as a child. He learns survival through hunting, first self-taught, then trained by a traveler named Minakata. During Uroro and Desscaras' battle, he intervenes, passing Uroro's trial due to a gender-based exemption, gaining Uroro's power and becoming history's first male witch. Desscaras recruits him to help collect Majiks, forming a group opposing the human-hating Majiks. Prophecy marks him as the messiah who will stop the World-Hater Majik at the cost of his life. Tricked into a binding blood oath with Desscaras, their fates become intertwined. A skilled hunter, Ichi follows a "death-for-death" code—only killing for food or protection—and instinctively senses bloodlust.
Desscaras (デスカラス, Desukarasu)
Voiced by: Yū Kobayashi (voiced comic)
Desscaras, the Abyssal Witch, is renowned as the most powerful witch in the world and one of the highest-ranking members of the Mantinel Witches Association. When cornered by Uroro—whose trial restricts women from harming his heart—she is saved by Ichi, who gains Uroro's power. She recruits Ichi as her assistant to monitor Uroro and aid in hunting other Majiks. Together with Kumugi, they form Team Desscaras, opposing Majiks that harm humans. A confident, assertive prodigy, Desscaras initially works alone, earning a reputation for being difficult. Beneath her pride, she cares deeply for her peers and grows attached to Ichi, who reminds her of her late brother, Libro, killed by the World-Hater Majik. Seeking vengeance, she binds Ichi to a mentor-pupil blood oath, linking their lives. With countless Majiks at her command, she stands among the few capable of facing the World-Hater Majik equally.
Kumugi Harvest (クムギ・ハーヴェスト, Kumugi Hāvesuto)
Voiced by: Misaki Watada (PV)
Kumugi, a Witch Cadet of the Mantinel Witches Association, and a member of the Witches' Research Club, is assigned to observe and document Ichi's actions for her master, Shirabedonna, later joining Team Desscaras. When she was a child, she caused an accident during a magic training that injured the right-eye of her older sister, Spica. Her guilt led Kumugi to listen to Spica's bidding for years, resulting in her lacking self-confidence and unable to go against her sister. Initially intimidated by Ichi's boldness, she grows fond of him after he values her kindness. Though timid, her dedication to her role and gradual bond with the team highlight her quiet resilience. Her friendship with Ichi also encouraged her to finally stand up to Spica. Kumugi actually possessed a rare trait in which she has twinned magic power reservoirs, which allows her to use multiple summoning spells for hours without getting exhausted and recovering her magic power at abnormal rate. The accident with Spica caused Kumugi to subconsciously blocked her second reservoir until Gokuraku's encouragement reawakened her love for magic and fully opened her second reservoir, unleashing her true magic power. While initially only using workaday spells, Kumugi is later given the permission to use Amadoro's Majik, Muscat, granting her its power to use a gun that unleash shots equal to her magic power.
Gokuraku Kagami (ゴクラク・カガミ)
Infamously known as Gokuraku the Brutalizer, he is a young man who is on the list of the witches' association's official dangerous persons list and a notorious criminal in the land of Kagami for repeatedly attempting to kill slumbering Majik Bakugami. His true identity is the prince of Kagami country. He wishes to become a witch to acquire Bakugami, and so he challenges and beats up any Majik he encounters. True to his title, he brutally beat up the Majik he encountered repeatedly to clear their trials, but due to not having any magic power, he's unable to acquire them even though he fulfilled the conditions to clear them. He formed an alliance with Ichi to acquire Bakugami, taking the trial together with Ichi by enduring the accumulated grief in the latter's place. He succeeded in clearing the trial, allowing Ichi to acquire Bakugami. He then officially joins Ichi's group as a special adjunct of magic item crafter.

=== Mantinel Witches Association ===
==== Witches ====
Moneygold (マネーゴールド, Manēgōrudo)
Voiced by: Miki Maruyama (voiced comic)
The Aureate Witch and the president of the Mantinel Witches Association, making her Desscaras's superior.
Shirabedonna (シラベドンナ)
The Analytic Witch, one of the highest-ranking members of the Mantinel Witches Association and the club supervisor of the Witches' Research Club as well as Kumugi's master. She is one of the most intelligent witches in the association, to the point that the whole witches of the association agreed with the result of her analysis without question. She's the one who vouched for Ichi after his demonstration test, allowing him to be approved into the association as a witch.
Chikutoge Togeice (チクトゲ ・トゲアイス, Chikutoge Togeaisu)
The Silver Snow Witch and one of the highest-ranking members of the Mantinel Witches Association, specializes in ice magic and ranks among the most naturally gifted witches, having acquired 17 Majiks. At just 11 years old, she and Desscaras became the youngest in Mantinel history to achieve Full Witch status. A dedicated workaholic and perfectionist, she strictly enforces discipline to uphold the Witches Association's reputation, frequently clashing with the rule-breaking Desscaras. Though stern, she genuinely cares for her fellow witches, believing proper appearances foster dignity. This approach earns her students' respect. Despite her competence, she suffers from remarkably poor direction sense, often walking opposite her intended destination.
Jikishirone (ジキシローネ, Jikishirōne)
The Oracle Witch and one of the highest-ranking members of the Mantinel Witches Association who is capable of seeing the future in the form of a prophecy. She is originally a girl who had been comatose for a decade until she was forced to clear the trial of Mirsam, the Prophecy Majik, causing her to be possessed by the Majik and her consciousness residing in the Magic Circle, with the Prophecy Majik - Mirsam, completely taking over her body and her identity. She forms a close bond with Mirsam, even giving her the nickname Sammy. She encourages her to try having faith in people so their shared dream of humans and Majiks coexisting peacefully will one day coming true.
Amodoro Ribboncandy (アモドーロ・リボンキャンディ, Amodōro Ribonkyandi)
The bullet witch and one of the highest-ranking members of the Mantinel Witches Association, who wields a "Giga Machine Gun" minigun. At one point, she got controlled by Fujimine's poison, causing her to betray the Association that allowed Hitsugi to infiltrate the HQ, and then directly attacked the HQ in attempt to kill Ichi. She was defeated through Ichi, Gokuraku, Minakata, and Zayero's teamwork, and was arrested. After her brainwash was undone, she received permission to go on a hunt for Hakari to rescue her kidnapped family members together with Team Desscaras and Boxster. She developed respect for Kumugi, whom she granted permission to use her magic, Muscat. Her vast magical reserves mean she has never run out of ammunition during a battle.
Otogiri Utsuné (オトギリ・ウツネ)
The cacophonous witch and one of the highest-ranking members of the Mantinel Witches Association.
Franken Dessucy (フランケン・デシューシー, Furanken Deshūshī)
The voracious witch and one of the highest-ranking members of the Mantinel Witches Association.
Tricaputo (トリカプト, Torikaputo)
The villainous witch and one of the highest-ranking members of the Mantinel Witches Association. She calls her self a "grande dame", wearing a purple dress, holding a cigar and silver parasol. She once had a close relationship with Fujimine, signing a Master-Pupil Blood Contract that connects their lives together. Because of this, Tricaputo was hidden away by the Association until she was forced to reveal herself when Fujimine attacked the Association. Her black Majik, Maiden, has the power to detoxify Fujimine's poison through the Majik's kiss.

==== Senior Witch Cadets ====
Love Joe (ラヴ・ジョー, Ravu Jō)
A Senior Witch Cadet captain and the head of Wands and Tools department of the association. Her department is the one responsible in handling the witches' equipment and Magic Stones. She was the one who confirmed Gokuraku's skill in magic item crafting, allowing him to become part of Team Desscaras as a Magic Item Crafter.
Decora Frill (デコラ・フリル, Dekora Furiru)
A Senior Witch Cadet captain and the head of Fashion department of the association. Her section is the one responsible in designing and making the witches' uniform.
Spica Harvest (スピカ・ハーヴェスト, Supika Hāvesuto)
Kumugi's older sister, who is two years her elder; she is a Senior Witch Cadet captain and the Section 1 Chief of the Mantinel Witches' Association Department of Inspections. When Kumugi failed as a child to cast a spell which would light a lightbulb, the bulb exploded, injuring Spica's right-eye. Spica then took advantage of Kumugi's guilt to make her do anything she told her to while secretly hiding the fact that she already had a magical surgery that healed her right-eye, only continuing to wear eyepatch to make herself look cool. She became interested in Ichi and tried to replace Kumugi's position in the team, but this was thwarted by Kumugi's objection and Ichi's rejection.

=== Magikeepers ===
The Magikeepers are a group of men who combat human criminals who abuse magic, focusing on especially heinous crimes committed by witches. They are not witches, but have weapons that affect Majiks. The government organized them to serve as a check to the power of the Manitel Witches' Association; regular magic criminals are handled by the police, but the Magikeepers are in charge of capturing dangerous criminals. Magikeeper weapons are called sacred treasures, each made from magic power-draining Shaka wood.

Chun (チュン)
Commissioner of the Magikeepers. He strictly adheres to the tradition of Magikeepers only handling magic users, refusing to involve the Magikeepers in the battle against World-Hater Majik, insisting that it's the Witches responsibility to fight against Majiks. He became interested in Ichi and wishes to recruit him into Magikeepers for his skills. In the past, he once got controlled by Fujimine, resulting in him killing his Magikeeper friends. As the result, Chun holds deep-seethed hatred and grudge against the witch, vowing to kill her.
Higarashi (ヒガラシ)
Higarashi is one of Magikeepers who accompanies Chun on his visit to the Mantinel Association. Along with his partner, Boxster, he first met Ichi when they apprehended a Desscaras impostor. He has a short stature compared to his partner and has a sweet tooth. He wields twin shortswords that's capable of cutting and containing Majiks.
Boxster (ボクスター, Bokusutā)
Boxster is one of Magikeepers who accompanies Chun on his visit to the Mantinel Association and Higarashi's partner. He is taller than Higarashi, resulting in the latter making him carry him due to his longer legs makes him faster at running. He is narcissist and vain, priding his good looks and expresses jealousy over anyone who's more popular than him. He wields a nine-section chain whip. Despite his preference for the nickname "Star", he is called "Boxie" by all who know him.
Zayero (ザイエロ, Zaiero)
Zayero is one of Magikeepers who accompanies Chun on his meeting with Moneygold. He wields a chakram.
Takeomi Minakata (タケオミ・ミナカタ)
Minakata is Ichi's laconic mentor who taught him hunting ten years before the story. He is one of Magikeepers who accompanies Chun on his meeting with Moneygold, which led to his reunion with Ichi, and is a recent recruit, only serving as a Magikeeper for three months, motivated not by the prospect of revenge on Fujimine but rather the chance to reunite with Ichi. He quickly formed a rivalry with Desscaras over who's the better mentor for Ichi. The Minakata family treasure is the sacred pillar.

=== Majiks ===
King Uroro (王の魔法, Kingu Uroro)
Voiced by: Yoshihito Sasaki (voiced comic)
Uroro, the King Majik, is among the most dangerous Majiks due to his hatred of humanity. Found dormant in Druid Mountain by Ichi, his trial required stopping his heart—impossible for witches due to a thousand-year restriction preventing women from harming it. Ichi pierced Uroro's heart during his battle with Desscaras, becoming the first male witch to acquire him. Unlike typical Majiks that turn to magic stones, Uroro persists as a sentient blob that emerges from Ichi's body, constantly attempting to manipulate him into fatal conflicts. By forming a pact with Ichi, he is capable of temporarily taking over Ichi's body to fight in his place. Known scientifically as the Ultra-Amplification Majik, his power maximizes spell potency but renders the witch unconscious for three days after each use.
Mirsam (ミルサム, Mirusamu)
The prophecy Majik (予言の魔法, Yogen no Mahō), nicknamed Sammy (サミー, Samī) by Jikishirone, who possesses Jikishirone's body and willingly cooperates with the Association. As she fully possesses Jikishirone's body, she takes on her identity as one of the highest-ranking members of the Mantinel Witches Association. True to her name, she's capable of seeing the future in the form of a prophecy, giving Jikishirone the title Oracle Witch. She prophesized's World-Hater Majik's demise at Ichi's hand at the cost of Ichi's life. Though cooperative with the witches and dreams of the world where humans and Majiks can coexist peacefully, she's cynical in trusting anyone be it humans or even her fellow Majiks. The only person she genuinely cares for is Jikishirone, whom she forms a close bond with. Witnessing the strong genuine love between Minerva and Chrono convinced her that the future that she and Jikishirone envisioned can come true, leading her to reject World-Hater's invitation and decided to side with Ichi.
Inazuri (雷狐)
Voiced by: Setsuo Itō (voiced comic)
Classified as Raiko Majik (雷狐の魔法, Raiko no Mahō; lit. 'Thunder Fox Magic'), he is a lightning Majik and the second Majik acquired by Ichi. He has the appearance of a large fox with five tails constantly surrounded by sparks of lightning around his body. His acquisition trial requires someone to steal his heart jewel that is on his neck, without being struck by any of his lightning. Ichi easily acquired him after using a trap that he usually used to neutralize a fox.
Uruwashi (氷鮫)
Classified as Hisame Majik (氷鮫の魔法, Hisame no Mahō; lit. 'Ice Shark Magic'), she is an ice Majik and the third Majik acquired by Ichi. She has the appearance of a shark wearing a diadem. She terrorized a village in Thazanwood, freezing the villagers into her personal ice sculpture. Her acquisition trial requires someone to make her look fabulous, which Ichi succeeded by cutting up her body and then decorated it like a sashimi.
Macilvaine (マシルヴェイン, Mashiruvein)
Classified as Kindake Majik (菌茸の魔法, Kindake no Mahō; lit. 'Fungus Mushroom Magic'), it is a mushroom Majik that caused havoc in the forest close to town of Hoitaka. Though it does not resent humans, it was classified as human-hater for making giant mushrooms appeared and spread spores that will overwhelm the town if it is left alone. As the result, it became the target for Team Desscaras and Team Togeice in their showdown. Its acquisition trial requires someone to cut its stem and harvest it while it is running away. Togeice acquired it after Ichi got distracted by the appearance of World-Hater Majik.
Ariadne (アリアドネ, Ariadone)
Classified as Origumo Majik (檻蜘蛛の魔法, Origumo no Mahō; lit. 'Cage Spider Magic'), this is a spider-like Majik who builds strong cages with its silk to imprison its prey until it is ready to eat them. Its trial involves destroying the cage and cutting off the horn on its head. It became Gokuraku's target and suffered torture under Gokuraku's repeated failed attempt to acquire it until Ichi fulfilled the trial instead.
Bakjam (バクジャム, Bakujamu)
Bakjam, commonly called Bakugami, is known as the Joyous Sorrow Majik. Bakjam absorbs human sadness only to later return it in overwhelming waves that drive victims to despair. Masquerading as a benevolent deity in tapir form, he gained worship after relieving Princess Richia's sadness—an act that spread through Kagami and led to the country's renaming as Bakugami. While revered as a god, he secretly admires the World-Hater as a true deity of destruction. For ten years he has stored collective sorrow, planning to unleash it to devastate the nation. His trial requires a chosen challenger to withstand this accumulated grief. Gokuraku succeeded in clearing the trial, resulting in Ichi acquiring Bakjam.
Chronoweaver (時操の魔法, Jisou no Mahō; lit. 'Time Manipulation Magic')
Nicknamed simply as Chrono by Kizashi and Chro (操ちゃん, Sou-chan) by Minerva, is an epic-class Majik capable of manipulating time, specifically able to freeze time within bubbles. Initially mistaken as a human-hater Majik, it's revealed that he is married to Minerva, a human woman, who is pregnant with their child. He bears no animosity towards humans, but also has no interest in them with Minerva being the sole exception. He's very protective of Minerva and the child she carries, even if he grows weaker as the child gradually absorbing his power. During Kizashi's attempt to kill Minerva, Chrono overused his power to rewind time to before Minerva's death and then fast-forwarded time to awaken Ichi, resulting in his death. Before his demise, he named his and Minerva's child Madoka.
Toxiterror
A Majik that voluntarily asked for help from the Mantinel Witches Association to mitigate the danger of their naturally-occurring poisons which corrode everything they touched. They were placed in a special enclosure and bonded with the witches over many years until one, Fujimine, betrayed the Association and acquired the Toxiterror Majik, killing dozens of witches and three Magikeepers in the process. Their magic allows Fujimine to manipulate people's memories into making them believe her as their most precious person through its poison, and heal fatal injuries.
Muscat
The Ribboncandy family's Majik that has been allied for generations. As part of tradition, they give a gun to the daughters commensurate with their magical powers and abilities.
[unnamed]
A devil-like Majik with the power of petrification. This Majik was captured by Desscaras 10-20 years ago, but she refused to use it, as it is a human-hater.
Kagura Orochi
A human-hater Majik whose power involves fire.

=== World-Hater and the Seven Stars ===
World-Hater (反世界の魔法, Hansekai no Mahō; lit. 'Anti-World Magic')
Classified as God Majik, they are an S-tier Majik with the ability to carve out and warp chunks of the world, including even Majik. They are the Mantinel Witch's Association's greatest enemy. Fujimine nicknames him "Haytee". 15 years before the story, they appeared and warped out two towns he covered in their barrier, killing every living beings inside, including Desscaras' younger brother, Libro. They reappeared in the town of Hoitaka to warp it, but this is thwarted by Ichi, Desscaras, and Togeice. They took an immediate interest in Ichi after he fearlessly expressed his desire to hunt and injured the Majik. They have a history with Uroro, the latter is so wary of them that he spent years laying low to avoid getting detected by him. Jikishirone prophesized that World-Hater Majik will eventually destroyed the world, but this can be prevented by Ichi, who will acquire them at the cost of his life. His shakujo staff, named "Cynosura", is one of the only weapons capable of warping magic and destroying Majiks.
Hitsugi (棺, lit. 'Coffin')
Hitsugi is the Reverser Majik (背反の魔法, Haihan no Mahō; lit. 'Rebellion Magic') who is one of the Seven Stars working directly under World-Hater. He infiltrates the association by disguising himself as a waiter during Ichi's debutante party to deliver a message from World-Hater to Jikishirone. He bears resentment for humanity, believing that they are corrupting and enslaving Majiks, and so work together with World-Hater, believing his master will annihilate humanity and free all Majiks. During Team Desscaras' mission on Chronostasis, he was acquired by Desscaras. He has the ability to reflect a magic by exposing them to the eyes on his tongue and also reanimating corpses as zombies. In his true form, he has a head of a human, a body of a lion and a tail of a fish. His trial requires a witch to kill 10,000 lives.
Kizashi (兆, lit. 'Omen')
A temperamental human-hater "Octobomb" Majik who can manipulate ocean currents and has the appearance of a giant, anthropomorphic octopus. He is responsible for sinking more than 300 ships, killing many humans who crosses the ocean he's residing. He enjoys playing with Chrono, who is the only one strong enough to withstand his attacks. After he learned that Chrono bears a child with a human woman and got weaker as the result, he decides to kill the unborn child so he can continue to play with him. Following Chrono's death, Kizashi felt guilty and let Desscaras acquired him. He is one of the Seven Stars in service to the World-Hater, and his trial requires the witch to kill him repeatedly until the number on his chest is reduced to 0. He has the ability to split off seven "brother" legs, each of which has a specialty: Speedy, Muscles, Gloomy, Stretch, Teeny, Chonk, and Puu.
Fujimine (フヂミネ)
The Vanquisher Witch, a wanted criminal who had killed many people regardless of gender or age, resulting the Magikeeper to mark her for execution. Decades before the story, Fujimine revolted against the Association and acquired the Toxiterror Majik that allows her to manipulate people's memories with its poison and heal fatal injuries. Despite being a human, she's collaborating with World-Hater, attacking the Association's HQ by controlling Amadoro and her family members to kill Ichi, but this was thwarted by Tricaputo and Desscaras' combined efforts. She used to have a close relationship with Tricaputo, signing Mentor-Pupil Blood Contract that connects their lives.
Hakari
The Disintegration Majik who hates humans, especially witches; they are a humanoid Majik with large bullhorns on their head. They have a history with Fujimine, whom they claim fears them despite her wanting to acquire Hakari, and they resent her the most. They can disintegrate anything trapped between their hands. To satisfy their trial, a witch must find three fragments of their magic stone hidden inside their castle and rejoin them.
Mayoi
A Majik comrade of Hakari who wears a long, hooded robe and a Noh mask with multiple eye holes. They have the ability to create a portal that can move people to a place of their choosing. Together with Hakari, they live in a walking castle powered by the magic of human girls that they abducted.
Sukemaru
The invisibility Majik working under Hakari who aspires to be one of the Seven Stars. True to their name, they can make not only themselves, but also others invisible with their ability. Unfortunately, this ability doesn't work on Ichi whose sharp instinct able to detect their hostile presence.

== Production ==
Author Osamu Nishi stated in an interview that in Japanese majo (魔女; lit. 'witch') is used only for woman witches, and she found it interesting that there is no equivalent word for male witches. At first, she wanted to write a manga about a boy who dreams of becoming a witch and a knight who protects witches. However, she later thought that a story set in a world where magic exists as living beings would be more interesting.

To make Ichi appear as a more unusual character in the story, Nishi portrayed him as a boy who is only interested in hunting. She decided to start the story with the "final boss" and chose King Uroro to be the first magic that Ichi captures. For the first scene in which Uroro appears, she was inspired by Howl's Moving Castle. The idea of adding a crown to Uroro came from Shiro Usazaki.

In the initial design of World-Hater Majik, the character was created as a smiling and kind-looking boy. However, Usazaki decided to depict him as someone who does not smile. When creating Desscaras, Nishi only asked Usazaki to use a "sad emoji and black hair", and the character's design was completed during an initial meeting that lasted five hours. Nishi also paid special attention to ensuring that the magics in the story were portrayed as neither enemies nor allies, believing that otherwise the readers would become bored.

== Publication ==
Written by Osamu Nishi and illustrated by Shiro Usazaki, the series began serialization in Weekly Shōnen Jump on September 9, 2024. It is Usazaki's first major work since her previous work, Act-Age, was canceled due to its writer's arrest. The first tankōbon volume was released on January 4, 2025. As of October 2, 2026, ten volumes have been released.

Viz Media and Manga Plus are publishing the series in English simultaneously with its Japanese release.

=== Volumes ===
No.	Original release date	Original ISBN	English release date	English ISBN
1	January 4, 2025	978-4-08-884402-2	February 3, 2026	978-1-9747-5775-6
1. "Ichi" (イチ); 2. "Uroro Majik" (ウロロの魔法, Uroro no Mahō); 3. "Raiko Majik" (雷狐の魔法, Raiko no Mahō); 4. "Natali, The Capital" (首都ナタリー, Shuto Natalī); 5. "Sherabedonna, The Analytic Witch" (追究の魔女シラベドンナ, Tsuikyū no Majo Shirabedonna); 6. "Team Desscaras" (デスカラス班, Desukarasu Han); 7. "The Hisame Majik, Part 1" (氷鮫の魔法①, Hisame no Mahō①)
Ichi is a feral boy and self-taught survivalist who has lived on Druid Mountain since he was six and abides by a "death for death" code, hunting only animals that kill humans. When Desscaras, the Abyssal Witch, comes to pass the trial of and capture Uroro, the powerful amplification Majik, Ichi instead succeeds, becoming the first male witch. Uroro's ultra-amplification power comes at a price: each time Ichi casts a spell, he sleeps for three days to recover. On the way back to the Mantinel Witches Association in the capital city of Natali, Ichi and Desscaras capture Inazuri, a lightning (Raiko) Majik, and help Witch Cadet Kumugi with her deliveries. After passing a test administered by Shirabedonna, the Analytic Witch, Kumugi is assigned to watch Ichi and record his actions; the trio form an anti-human-hater Majik squad and head to Jauz Village in Thazanwood to capture Uruwashi, an ice (Hisame) Majik.
2	March 4, 2025	978-4-08-884417-6	April 7, 2026	978-1-9747-6263-7
8. "The Hisame Majik, Part 2" (氷鮫の魔法②, Hisame no Mahō②); 9. "The Hisame Majik, Part 3" (氷鮫の魔法③, Hisame no Mahō③); 10. "The Hisame Majik, Part 4" (氷鮫の魔法④, Hisame no Mahō④); 11. "Witches' Conference" (魔女会議, Majo Kaigi); 12. "The Kindake Majik" ((菌茸の魔法, Kindake no Mahō); 13. "The Silver Snow Witch" (銀雪の魔女, Ginsetsu no Majo); 14. "???"; 15. "S-Tier Majik Warning" (最大級魔法警報, Saidaikyū Mahō Keihō); 16. "The World-Hater Majik" (反世界の魔法, Han-Sekai no Mahō)
Ichi calls out the vain Uruwashi, who issues an unusual challenge to give her a fabulous fashion. After Desscaras and Kumugi fail, Ichi leaps inside Uruwashi and starts filleting, using techniques he learned from his mentor Minakata to display the shark-like Uruwashi as exquisite sashimi. He succeeds and frees the villagers. Moneygold, the Aureate Witch, convenes a conference to discuss Ichi; Shirabedonna proposes to announce him to the world, but Chikutoge Togeice, the Silver Snow Witch, opposes, saying he needs years of more education. To resolve the dispute, Togeice proposes a competition with Ichi in Hoitaka to see who first can acquire Macilvaine, a mushroom (Kindake) Majik; its trial requires the contestants to cut its stem and harvest it. Togeice goes first, using her signature dignified, disciplined, beautiful style to freeze all the mushrooms; Ichi meanwhile tracks Macilvaine relentlessly. As Kumugi lures Macilvaine, Ichi is about to complete the trial, but switches targets abruptly to the World-Hater Majik who appeared, giving Togeice the win. The Witches Council declares an emergency over the S-tier World-Hater; instead of being intimidated, Ichi is exhilarated.
3	June 4, 2025	978-4-08-884580-7	June 2, 2026	978-1-9747-6573-7
17. "Out of Your Depth" (身の程知らず, Mi no Hodo Shirazu); 18. "Desscaras, the Abyssal Witch" (深淵の魔女 デスカラス, Shin'en no Majo Desukarasu); 19. "Magic Circle" (魔法心円, Majikku Sākuru); 20. "The Oracle" (予言の魔女, Yogen no Majo); 21. "How We Live" (生き方, Ikikata); 22. "Mentor-Pupil Blood Contract" (師弟血判状, Shitei Keppan-jō); 23. "Gokuraku the Brutalizer" (苛虐のゴクラク, Kagyaku no Gokuraku); 24. "Gokuraku and Male Witches" (魔男とゴクラク, Madan to Gokuraku); 25. "The Joyous Country" (幸福の国, Kōfuku no Kuni)
After Ichi halts the World-Hater's advance with an amplified ice attack, Desscaras and Togeice battle the World-Hater, which withdraws without revealing its trial. Jikishirone, the Oracle Witch, prophesizes Ichi will defeat the World-Hater Majik by sacrificing his own life. Moneygold commands the prophecy be kept secret; Desscaras is reminded of her younger brother Libro, a victim of the World-Hater, and she enters a mentor-pupil blood contract with Ichi to make him family, which she jokes makes him her slave. Ichi is moved by joining a family, but the other witches realize Desscaras is also doomed if Ichi dies; she vows to train Ichi to survive the World-Hater. The anti-human-hater Majik team travel to Bakugami to challenge Origumo, but Gokuraku the Brutalizer is already tormenting the spider-like Majik. When Ichi completes Origumo's challenge, Gokuraku kidnaps him and asks how he also can be a male witch. Ichi introduces him to Uroro, who tells Gokuraku to kill the slumbering Ichi, but the transparent attempt at betrayal fails. Desscaras and Kumugi arrive in Bakugami, where they meet the eponymous, beloved "blessed slumber" Majik; Gokuraku tells Ichi that Bakugami is a parasite and they prepare to capture it.
4	August 4, 2025	978-4-08-884611-8	August 4, 2026	978-1-9747-1673-9
26. "Lord Bakugami" (バクガミ様, Bakugami-sama); 27. "Most Wanted" (指名手配犯, Shimei Tehaihan); 28. "Unknown Emotions" (知らない感情, Shiranai Kanjō); 29. "Begin the Operation" (作戦開始, Sakusen Kaishi); 30. "Future Foretold" (告げる未来, Tsugeru Mirai); 31. "Challenger" (挑戦者, Chōsensha); 32. "Sacrifice" (イケニエ, Ikenie); 33. "Fates Entwined" (一蓮托生, Ichiren Takushō); 34. "Invisible Cage" (見えない檻, Mienai Ori)
Ten years ago, Princess Richia of Kagami, Gokuraku's older sister, discovered Bakugami took away her sadness, and the country was renamed to honor it, but this "joyous sorrow" Majik actually concentrates sorrow and returns it, driving victims to suicidal depression. Gokuraku was exiled for defying the Majik, but vows to restore his sister's emotions. In the present, Gokuraku and Ichi attack the Majik, and the outraged nation engages Desscaras to capture them. Richia is overjoyed that Gokuraku has made friends with Ichi and invites them to the Bakugami anniversary party, forgetting the more significant anniversary of their mother's death. Ichi distracts the citizens and Desscaras extracts and interrogates Bakugami: he plans to honor the World-Hater by returning the decade of extracted sadness; his trial is for one person to bear all the concentrated sorrows. After Gokuraku volunteers, Bakugami drives him insane with rage by planting a vision of Richia accepting the returned sorrow as punishment for welcoming Bakugami. The trial also requires Ichi be chained to the murderous Gokuraku, who grants Ichi permission to attack but warns him to avoid striking critical points. Bakugami believes Ichi's light attacks are torturing Gokuraku, but he was using Ariadne to imprison Gokuraku with thick web threads, restraining him physically as he continues to struggle with overwhelming sorrow.
5	October 3, 2025	978-4-08-884695-8	October 6, 2026	978-1-9747-6844-8
35. "Atone" (贖罪, Shokuzai); 36. "Stake" (杭, Kui); 37. "Because I Had You" (キミがいたから, Kimi ga Ita kara); 38. "Give Me a Hug" (わたしを抱き締めて, Watashi o Dakishimete); 39. "Feelings Returned" (取り戻した感情, Torimodoshita Kanjō); 40. "Succession" (継承, Keishō); 41. "For You" (キミのために, Kimi no Tame ni); 42. "Awareness" (自覚せよ, Jikaku Seyo); 43. "Plenty" (豊作, Hōsaku)
Gokuraku is tortured by a vision of Richia dying by suicide to atone for forgetting their mother, but manage to endure by recalling Ichi's question about the meaning of a family that Gokuraku likens as his unbreakable support. As Gokuraku is close to clearing the trial, Bakugami attempts to gain more sorrow from Richia, but she rejects them. This allows Gokuraku to complete the trial and Ichi acquires the Majik, resulting with the citizens' long-suppressed emotions return to them. A delayed funeral is held for the queen, where the king abdicates and Richia ascends to the throne. Gokuraku initially turns down Ichi's request to join him, but after Richia shows him the entire country wanting to apologize for misunderstanding how he protected them, Gokuraku promises to fight with Ichi. Returning to the Association, Gokuraku admits his crime to Moneygold and ready to accept any punishment, so she declares his punishment is to serve Team Desscaras and accompany Ichi as a magic item crafter. The Association plan a witch debut party for Ichi, giving Kumugi pause when she sees Spica Harvest, her elder sister, is on the list of invitees.
6	December 4, 2025	978-4-08-884865-5	December 1, 2026	978-1-9747-6910-0
44. "Presents" (おくりもの, Okurimono); 45. "Appearances Deceiving" (見かけによらず, Mikake ni Yorazu); 46. "Important Memories" (大事な思い出, Daiji na Omoide); 47. "Kumugi Harvest" (クムギ・ハーヴェスト, Kumugi Hāvesuto); 48. "A New Prophecy" (新たな予言, Arata na Yogen); 49. "A Glass of Water" (お水を一杯, Omizu o Ippai); 50. "Those Who Defy" (反く者, Somoku Mono); 51. "To a New Time!" (新たな時へ!, Arata na Toki e!); 52. "Freeze" (フリーズ, Furīzu)
Togeice gives Ichi an assignment to spend some of his rewards, and he gifts a jar of star candy to Desscaras, thanking her for welcoming him to her family. Spica dismisses Ichi as a romantic prospect, only to be stunned by how attractive he is. Kumugi flashes back to her childhood, when Spica bullied her for years, so when Spica suggests that she replace her younger sister on Team Desscaras, Kumugi objects and Ichi bluntly rejects Spica. Jikishirone reports no new prophecies to the Witches' Conference; that night, she dreams of the World-Hater killing her, waking to find Hitsugi, a head-hunter who tells her to join the World-Hater and accept no more prophecies that speak of him. Its escape is interrupted by Desscaras, but it manages to flee, leaving a promise that its master will end the era of human witches enslaving Majiks. Reporting back, Hitsugi says it has sown doubt in Desscaras and Jikishirone. Team Desscaras finishes their outfitting and Jikishirone reveals a false prophecy to join them on the next hunt, for "Chronoweaver", the epic-class Time Majik, at the ghost ship Chronostasis, floating on the Pendulum Seas. They want to capture him as a useful tool against the World-Hater, but little is known about him. After their initial encounter, they are shocked to meet his human wife, who is pregnant with a hybrid child.
7	March 4, 2026	978-4-08-884874-7	February 2, 2027	978-1-9747-7157-8
53. "A Heavy Blow" (重い一撃, Omoi Ichigeki); 54. "Interloper" (踏み入る者, Fumiiru Mono); 55. "Kneel" (跪け, Hizamazuke); 56. "Extra" (エクストラ, Ekusutora); 57. "Love and Hate" (大好きと大嫌い, Daisuki to Daikirai); 58. "Nurture the Future" (紡いでいく, Tsumuideiku); 59. "Shifting Futures" (うごく未来, Ugoku Mirai); 60. "In Between" (間, Hazama); 61. "Vitals" (急所, Kyūsho)
Ichi stops the hunt after learning Chronoweaver never hurt humans; his wife Minerva slaps Jikishirone for suggesting the unborn child should die. Kizashi, an octopus-like Majik who manipulates currents, is responsible for the countless sunken ships and sailor deaths; his trial requires a witch to kill him repeatedly. He loves Chrono for withstanding rough "play" attacks and offers to kill the baby so they can continue playing. Ichi tries unsuccessfully to boil him using a Uroro-amplified lightning attack. Team Desscaras retreats; Ichi revives after making a pact with Uroro and the Majik takes over his body for five minutes. Uroro atomizes Kizashi with an ultra-amplified Inazuri discharge as his time expires. Jikishirone reprimands Sammy; when she wakes, Minerva apologies and explains she will have the baby for Chrono's happiness. Jikishirone has a bloody vision of Kizashi's return, so the witches dispatch a squad led by Gokuraku with Minerva and the still-unconscious Ichi. Kizashi reassembles and attacks alongside Hitsugi, who reanimates the corpses of the sailors drowned by Kizashi to demonstrate the fragility of human life; Chrono decays the zombies into dust and says that Minnie taught him the power of love, calling Hitsugi "a lonely creature". After Chrono decays Hitsugi, he uses corpse dust to reanimate and raises 10,000 corpses to give Desscaras the people she will need to kill for his trial, including her brother Libro. Hitsugi also commands Kizashi to seek out and kill Minerva, the unborn child, and Ichi with the power of World-Hater's staff; Chrono restrains Kizashi in a bubble but he breaks free with the staff.
8	May 1, 2026	978-4-08-885043-6	—	—
62. "Hearts Ripped Asunder" (引き裂かれた心, Hikisakareta Kokoro); 63. "Threat" (脅威, Kyōi); 64. "Promise" (約束, Yakusoku); 65. "Libro" (リブロ, Riburo); 66. "Five Seconds of Connection" (繋げる5秒, Tsunageru Go-byō); 67. "That One Second" (その一秒が, Sono Ichi-byō ga); 68. "The Ebb and Flow of the Waves" (寄せては返す, Yosete wa Kaesu); 69. "Star of Light" (光星, Kōsei); 70. "One Last Dream" (最後の夢, Saigo no Yume)
Kizashi reminisces about his prior "playtimes" with Chrono and says that Chrono's exposure to humans has weakened him; Kizashi splits off seven legs, each carrying ten lives, leaving his main body with 133. The Speedy Kizashi "brother" leg catches up to the fleeing witches, but Gokuraku shows astonishing brutality, ending Speedy's final life by eating him. As Desscaras scythes through the zombies, she is surprised by the revived Libro and recalls her childhood: the siblings were orphaned by a plague and she resisted studying magic until Libro said she could earn a fortune. Later, the entire village was warped out of existence by the World-Hater, killing 4500, including Libro; she was the sole survivor. Desscaras promised Libro she would become the greatest witch, motivating her to pass the trials of countless Majiks. As Desscaras embraces the reanimated Libro, they are overwhelmed by zombies. Jikishirone helps Gokuraku identify five seconds in which he charges an attack and defeats the Kizashi "brother" legs except for Puu, who goes berserk when his brothers die. Chrono met Minerva when she was a young woman sacrificed to the sea by her village; her resilience surprised Chrono, who develops love for her. Puu attacks while Minerva goes into labor, impaling her on a claw, but Chrono unwinds the event, refusing to allow her to die. Chrono then speeds up Ichi's recovery. As Ichi awakens, fending off Puu this time, Uroro is unleashed briefly, but Ichi asserts control and unleashes Bakjam, the joyous sorrow Majik, sending Puu off without suffering. In the distance, Chrono begins disintegrating.
9	July 3, 2026	978-4-08-885101-3	—	—
71. "These Few Final Seconds" (あと数秒, Ato Sūbyō); 72. "Even One Moment Longer" (一瞬でも長く, Isshun Demo Nagaku); 73. "A Star Falls" (星堕ちる, Hoshi Ochiru); 74. "Let's Go Home" (戻ろう, Modorō); 75. "Coming Together" (繋いでいく者, Tsunaideiku Mono); 76. "Empathy" (寄り寄い, Yoriyoi); 77. "Gatecrashers" (闖入者, Chinnyūsha); 78. "Chance Meetings Are Fate" (袖振り合って, Sode Furiatte); 79. "How're You Doing?" (お元気？, Ogenki?)
Chrono pushed past his natural limits; as he fades, he begs Kizashi to love weak humans, as he has. Minerva sees him in the looking glass and wishes for a little more time. Chrono names their child Madoka and says his life began only after he met Minnie. Hitsugi stabs an overwhelmed Kizashi in the back; Desscaras emerges from a mob of zombies to impale Hitsugi. Hitsugi calls Desscaras cold-blooded for slaying her own brother Libro, but she has finally achieved his dream to become a hero so she can send him to rest; she acquires Hitsugi and Kizashi, then passes out from the effort. As she falls to the sea's surface, Ichi catches her just in time. With the mission complete, they return to Natali. At the hospital, Minerva safely delivers Madoka with the help of Shirabedonna; Ichi invites Jikishirone to join Team Desscaras in hunting the World-Hater. When Desscaras seeks solace in her memories, Ichi tracks her down and falls asleep in her lap. Togeice archly comments that dogs snuggle with their masters when they sense sadness. Moneygold orders Team Desscaras to stay out of headquarters to avoid offending the visiting Magikeepers, who are charged with apprehending heinous magical criminals, especially witches. Magikeeper Commissioner Chun proposes that Ichi join their ranks; when Ichi shows up, uninvited, he immediately seeks one out: his mentor Minakata. Minakata and Desscaras verbally spar over who is responsible for Ichi's development. Chun asks Ichi for help to find Fujimine, the vicious Vanquisher Witch who has aligned with the World-Hater Majik and is responsible for countless murders. Fujimine visits the World-Hater and deduces he is interested in Ichi, as is she.
10	October 2, 2026	978-4-08-885207-2	—	—
80. "Traitor" (裏切り者, Uragirimono); 81. "Put Up" (相対, Aitai); 82. "Successors" (継承せし者, Keishō Seshi Mono); 83. "A Moth and Flame" (夏の虫, Natsu no Mushi); 84. "I Want Him" (あの子が欲しい, Ano ko ga Hoshī); 85. "Hate, Hate, Hate You" (嫌よ嫌よも大嫌い, Iya yo Iya yo mo Daikirai); 86. "Crossing the Line" (境界線, Kyōkaisen); 87. "Exchange of Blows" (うち合って, Uchiatte); 88. "Crystal Clear" (白黒はっきり, Shirokuro Hakkiri)
Chun vows to execute Fujimine, who is responsible for more than a thousand deaths, and speculates that she must be working with a traitor within the Association; Fujimine contacts the traitor, Amodoro Ribboncandy, and asks her to kill Ichi. When Amodoro appears, Ichi is restrained by Minakata, who reminds Ichi to observe before leaping to action. Ichi and Gokuraku goad Amodoro into jumping high, where Minakata slams his Sacred Pillar into her to drain her magical energy. Fujimine then materializes and charms everyone with a spell, making them all believe they are friends, although Chun manages to resist. Tricaputo arrives and releases Desscaras, the grande dame revealing she has long experience with Fujimine. Realizing Ichi signed a mentor-pupil blood contract with Desscaras, Fujimine tries to kill him, only to be stabbed by Ichi, triggering his blood-for-blood instinct. Fujimine heals herself before she is retrieved by the World-Hater, who shows his displeasure; while expressing contrition, she says she knows why he is interested in Ichi. In the aftermath, Amodoro and her associates are arrested, and Desscaras engages Minakata in an intense Magipong match to determine Ichi's true mentor. In her private sauna, Moneygold berates herself for exposing Tricaputo's hiding location to Fujimine and the Magikeepers, vowing to keep the mentor-pupil blood contract between Tricaputo and Fujimine secret.
11	December 4, 2026	978-4-08-885314-7	—	—

=== Chapters not yet in tankōbon format ===
These chapters have yet to be published in a tankōbon volume. They were originally serialized in Japanese in issues of Weekly Shōnen Jump.

89. "One-on-One" (一対一で, Ittaiichi de)
90. "Looking Forward To It" (楽しみだ, Tanoshimi da)
91. "First Impressions" (ファーストインプレッション, Fāsuto Inpuresshon)
92. "What, I'm Not Invited?" (お呼びでない?, Oyobidenai?)
93. "A Beautiful Break-In" (美麗突撃, Birei Totsugeki)
94. "To Be Clapped" (挟んで打つべし, Hasande Utsubeshi)
95. "A Bout" (お手合わせ, Oteawase)
96. "The Greatest Tag Team" (最強タッグ, Saikyō Taggu)
97. "Doggo" (わんわん, Wanwan)
98. "Entrusted to Me" (託されたから, Takusareta Kara)
99. "One Strike, for Starters" (ひとまず一撃, Hitomazu Ichigeki)
100. "Witch" (魔女, Majo)
101. "To the Beyond" (遥かまで, Haruka Made)
102. "How to Use Magic" (魔法の使い方, Mahō no Tsukaikata)
103. "Wrenched Open" (こじあける, Kojiakeru)
104. "Limits Undone" (制限解除, Seigen Kaijo)
105. "Tag, You're It" (タッチ, Tatchi)
106. "Take Hands" (手合わせを, Teawase o)
107. "We Are Ribboncandy" (我われらリボンキャンディ, Warera Ribonkyandi)

== Reception ==
Nick Valdez of ComicBook.com described the first chapter of Ichi the Witch as the "strongest the magazine has seen since the likes of Kagurabachi", and said "it could be the next big thing". Joshua Fox of Screen Rant praised the worldbuilding, artwork, and protagonist of the story.

The series has been recommended by manga authors Kōhei Horikoshi and Katsura Hoshino.

The series won the 11th Next Manga Award in the print category in 2025. It ranked 11th on the 2025 "Book of the Year" list by Da Vinci magazine. It, alongside Mii-chan and Yamada-san, was ranked fourth in the 2026 edition of Takarajimasha's Kono Manga ga Sugoi! guidebook's list of the best manga for male readers. It was nominated for the 19th Manga Taishō in 2026, and was ranked tenth. It was nominated for the 50th Kodansha Manga Award in the shōnen category in 2026. The series won the Daruma for Best New Manga and was nominated in the Daruma for Best Manga, Drawing, and Action Manga categories at the Japan Expo Awards in the same year.

== See also ==
- Welcome to Demon School! Iruma-kun, another manga series written and illustrated by Osamu Nishi
- Act-Age, another manga series illustrated by Shiro Usazaki
