= Opyl =

Opyl Limited
- Type: Public company
- Traded as: ASX: OPL
- Industry: Clinical trial recruitment, AI predictive technologies
- Founded: 2013
- Headquarters: Melbourne, Australia
- Key people: Michelle Gallaher CEO
- Website: opyl.ai

Opyl (ASX: OPL) is a Melbourne-based company listed on the Australian Securities Exchange that applies artificial intelligence to improving clinical trial efficiencies. The company has two key platforms: Opin (www.opin.ai) a global clinical trial recruitment platform and service as well as TrialKey a Saas software as a service platform (www.trialkey.ai) that predicts and designs optimized clinical trial protocols (plans), reducing the risk of failure and improving a return on investment in new and emerging medicines, devices, and diagnostics..

Opyl (ASX:OPL) is a rebrand and strategic realignment from a former company known as ShareRoot (ASX:SRO), a US-based martech platform that secured rights to user-generated content on social media, predominantly used by big brands that collaborated with influencers.

Before going public in 2016, ShareRoot had previously participated in 500 Startups batch 8 and raised a round of angel investing.

ShareRoot was rebranded to Opyl in 2020 to work on technology to support the health and life sciences sector.

Opyl launched its first AI-enabled digital health platform Opin.ai in May 2020, recruiting patients into clinical trials via precision social media and digital platform that is HIPAA certified and compliant, providing a patient-led experience, and changing the way trials are traditionally recruited via doctor-led referrals. Opin is a global multi-language clinical trial recruitment platform that leverages social media and digital communities to find, engage with and recruit participants for clinical trials and studies. Opyl's second AI-enabled platform is TrialKey, a clinical trial protocol design and prediction software (Saas) that is in advanced development and preparing to launch as decision support for investors and fund managers in the lifesciences sector and then later with a second launch to clinical operations and CRO (contract research organisations).
