= Mii-chan and Miss Yamada =

Japanese manga series

- Cover of the first volume

みいちゃんと山田さん (Mii-chan to Yamada-san)
- Genre: Drama
- Manga
- Written by: Nene Azuki
- Published by: Kodansha
- English publisher: NA: Seven Seas Entertainment
- Imprint: Sirius KC DX
- Magazine: Magazine Pocket
- Original run: September 8, 2024 – August 16, 2026
- Volumes: 7
- Anime
- Released: 2027 – scheduled
- icon

Mii-chan and Miss Yamada (Japanese: みいちゃんと山田さん, Hepburn: Mii-chan to Yamada-san) is a Japanese manga series written and illustrated by Nene Azuki. It was serialized on Kodansha's shōnen manga website Magazine Pocket from September 2024 to August 2026, with its individual chapters collected into seven volumes. An anime adaptation is set to premiere in 2027.

== Plot ==
Set in Kabukicho in 2012, the story follows Misaki Yamada, a hostess at a cabaret club with years of experience, and Miiko Nakamura, a new hostess nicknamed Mii-chan. Yamada finds herself drawn towards Mii-chan's optimism, despite that Mii-chan cannot read kanji nor understand social cues. The story depicts the 12 months of their friendship leading up to Mii-chan's murder.

== Production ==
In 2025, Azuki stated through an interview with Magazine Pocket that she wanted to write a drama about "people with problems" and felt that the nightlife would be a setting that fit the theme. Azuki set the story in 2012 because she felt nightlife in the 2010s, in comparison to current day, was more closed-off due to the lack of social media use, as well as a lack of public awareness of mental health disorders.

While writing the story, Azuki researched the topic by reading books on juvenile delinquency and psychology. Azuki also interviewed staff of organizations that provide life and legal advice for women in the sex industry. For the characters, Azuki wanted each to have a unique but also realistic personality. Azuki tried not to make sexual depictions too graphic, believing that is not the selling point of the manga and that making them too graphic would alienate female readers. After her comics went viral on Twitter, she was contacted by Kodansha to create a full length series on Magazine Pocket. Azuki stated that by the time she was asked to have Mii-chan and Miss Yamada serialized, she already had the entire story planned up to the ending and added more details about the characters during its serialization.

In July 2026, Azuki made several statements directly contradicting her past interviews, following the backlash from the anime announcement. She initially stated in 2025 that, while the story was fictional, Mii-chan was based on an acquaintance that she knew in real life. However, in 2026, she denied this, as well as denying that the manga was based on her own past experiences. Furthermore, Azuki denied that she had worked in the nightlife industry, despite stating in previous interviews that she had worked as a hostess in cabaret clubs.

While Azuki stated in 2025 that she drew the comic "for fun" on her own Twitter account, following accusations that she was promoting prostitution, she has since denied she was the owner of "Diana", the name of the Twitter account that initially posted the comics. Azuki had initially released Mii-chan and Miss Yamada as "Diana", as well as Yoru no Kotoba-tachi, a series of comic essays based on the sex industry. While Azuki asserts that she was the original creator of Mii-chan and Miss Yamada, she stated that she was contracted by the account's owner to produce comics about the women working in the nightlife industry up until February 2024.

== Media ==
=== Manga ===
Written and illustrated by Nene Azuki, the series began serialization on Kodansha's shōnen manga website Magazine Pocket on September 8, 2024. Its serialization ended on August 16, 2026. The series' individual chapters were collected into seven tankōbon volumes released from December 23, 2024, to September 9, 2026.

In January 2026, Seven Seas Entertainment announced that they had licensed the series for English publication beginning in December.

A voice comic starring Megumi Han as both Mii-chan and Yamada-san was released in December 24, 2025.

==== Volumes ====
No.	Original release date	Original ISBN	English release date	English ISBN
1	December 23, 2024	978-4-06-537943-1	December 8, 2026	979-8-89863-531-2
2	March 21, 2025	978-4-06-538749-8	April 6, 2027	979-8-89863-550-3
3	June 23, 2025	978-4-06-539730-5	—	—
4	September 22, 2025	978-4-06-540642-7	—	—
5	December 23, 2025	978-4-06-541792-8	—	—
6	April 23, 2026	978-4-06-543133-7	—	—
7	September 9, 2026	978-4-06-544764-2	—	—

=== Anime ===
An anime adaptation was announced on July 26, 2026. It is set to premiere in 2027.

== Reception ==
The series was nominated for the Next Manga Award in the web manga category in 2025. Alongside Ichi the Witch, it was ranked fourth in the 2026 edition of Takarajimasha's Kono Manga ga Sugoi! guidebook's list of the best manga for male readers. The series was nominated for the 50th Kodansha Manga Award in 2026 in the general category. By July 2026, the manga had over 2.8 million copies in circulation. By August 2026, the series had three million copies in circulation.

The "cute" illustrations, contrasted with themes including incest, domestic violence, and mental illness, helped the manga become popular on social media. Tomoe Ikeda of the Saga Shimbun enjoyed the story, feeling that it was emotional and that the characters were portrayed realistically. Kai-You reported that the manga was praised for highlighting the plight of women forced to live in the red-light district. However, the manga also has been criticized for its depictions of mental illness, with some claiming that it reinforces stereotypes about mentally disabled people and focuses on shock value and spectacle instead of realism. When Yahoo! News Japan interviewed more than ten professionals in the anime and publishing industry, the majority of the reviews were negative, with many reviewers stating they would not "show the manga to their children", as well as it being "hard to accept" and "lacks nuance and depth" in its portrayal of the "darkness of the lower class".

=== Criticism of the anime adaptation ===
The announcement of the anime adaptation caused controversy on social media due to the manga's depictions of mental illness and sex work, and there were concerns that the anime adaptation would lead to more bullying and discrimination. Kai-You and Sports Nippon reported that "Mii-chan" has been used as a derogatory term towards people with mental illnesses on social media. Additionally, the timing of the announcement on the tenth anniversary of the Sagamihara stabbings, in which 19 disabled people were killed, was perceived as insensitive. The anime production committee released a statement acknowledging the concerns and promising to seek advice from experts and add proper content disclaimers. The manga's social media account released a separate statement, stating that the manga was "not created with the intention of discriminating against or disparaging individuals with specific disabilities or those in particular circumstances".

The announcement of the anime adaptation also led to accusations of Azuki endorsing sex work and trafficking women into prostitution due to her connection to "Diana", a Twitter account that posts comic essays about women in the sex industry. Azuki had previously released comics as Diana, which were later compiled in Yoru no Kotoba-tachi. On July 31, 2026, Azuki clarified on her Twitter account that she had no experience in the sex industry and was only commissioned by the account owner of "Diana" to draw several comics up until February 2024.
