= MyChild App =

Mobile app

MyChild App is an Android app that helps parents screen developmental disorders in their children between the age of 1 and 24 months. The app contains information for parents about the different stages of a child's development.

== Background ==
Launched in 2015 on Google PlayStore, the app is a consumer product of the parent company, Time Ahead, Inc. Its office is based in Bhopal, Madhya Pradesh, India. As of August 2016, the app had been downloaded by 11,000+ users in 140+ countries and is a part of fbstart case study.

== Funding ==
In 2015, MyChild App raised a seed round of $100k led by 500 Startups, followed by angel investors Samir Bangara, Anisha Mittal, Pallav Nadhani, Deobrat Singh, Lalit Mangal, Arihant Patni, Amit Gupta, Dr. Ritesh Malik, Saurab Paruthi, and Singapore Angel Network.
