= Bugherd.com =

BugHerd is an Australian web-based issue tracking and website feedback tool. It allows attaching comments to individual webpage elements and organise the resulting feedback as tasks.

The app entered public beta in 2011 and participated in the Australian Startmate accelerator and the United States-based 500 Startups programme. BugHerd later received venture capital funding in 2012 and 2014. An expansion into additional software products was followed by restructuring and a renewed focus on the original application.

== History ==
=== Early development ===
BugHerd was developed in Melbourne by Alan Downie and Matt Milosavljevic as a tool for reporting problems on websites. Its early interface allowed users to identify individual elements of a webpage and attach comments, rather than documenting issues through separate screenshots and written reports.

The application was in open beta by March 2011. That year, BugHerd participated in the inaugural cohort of the Australian Startmate accelerator and subsequently joined the second cohort of 500 Startups in the United States.

In August 2011, BugHerd participated in the 500 Startups Demo Day. It also received a People's Choice award at the Australian technology event Tech23.

=== Funding and product expansion ===
In January 2012, BugHerd received A$500,000 funding from Melbourne-based Starfish Ventures. Later it participated in Startmate and 500Startups and was intended to support further development.

In August 2014, BugHerd secured a further A$1 million in Series A funding to develop additional software applications beyond the original website feedback tool. The proposed tools comprised the original BugHerd application, a task-management system called Stack and a planned design-feedback tool called Brief. Stack was available at the time of the announcement, while Brief remained under development. The expansion was intended to extend BugHerd's existing issue-tracking functionality into broader task management and collaboration workflows.

=== Restructuring ===
The expansion into additional products was followed by operational difficulties. In 2019, SmartCompany reported that approximately two years of development work on the new applications had not produced the anticipated commercial results, leading to workforce reductions and a period of limited development. An arrangement was subsequently reached to repurchase equity from investors, a process that reportedly took approximately 18 months. The original BugHerd application continued operating and remained profitable during the restructuring. Stephen Neville, a former digital executive at IPG Mediabrands, subsequently became chief executive. By October 2019, development had been refocused on the original application, and eight employees who had previously been made redundant had been rehired.

== Functionality ==
BugHerd combines visual website feedback with issue tracking and task management. Users can select individual webpage elements, attach comments and create reports for review by members of a development team.

A 2013 review published by the Polish technology website Antyweb described the application as consisting of a browser extension and a web-based task management interface. Reported issues could be organised by status and associated with information about the affected webpage. The software also supported integrations with external development tools, including GitHub, and plugins for content management systems such as WordPress and Drupal.
