= Yahoo Japan =

Japanese web portal

Yahoo! Japan
- Website type: Web portal
- Available in: Japanese
- Headquarters
- No. of locations: 2 (Nagoya and Osaka)
- Founders: SoftBank (now SoftBank Group); Yahoo! Inc.
- Parent: Yahoo! Japan Corporation (1996–2023); LY Corporation (2023–present)
- Website: yahoo.co.jp
- Commercial: Yes
- Registration: Optional
- Launched: April 1, 1996
- Current status: Online

Yahoo! Japan (ヤフー, Yafū) is a Japanese web portal. It was the most-visited website in Japan in October 2018, and among the top 50 worldwide.

In 2020, Yahoo! Japan was the 4th most visited website in Japan and contains many services outside search, including auctions, weather, and mapping services. In terms of use as a search engine, it has never surpassed Google. The company is the second largest search engine used in Japan as of July 2021, with a market share of 19% behind Google's 77%.

== History ==
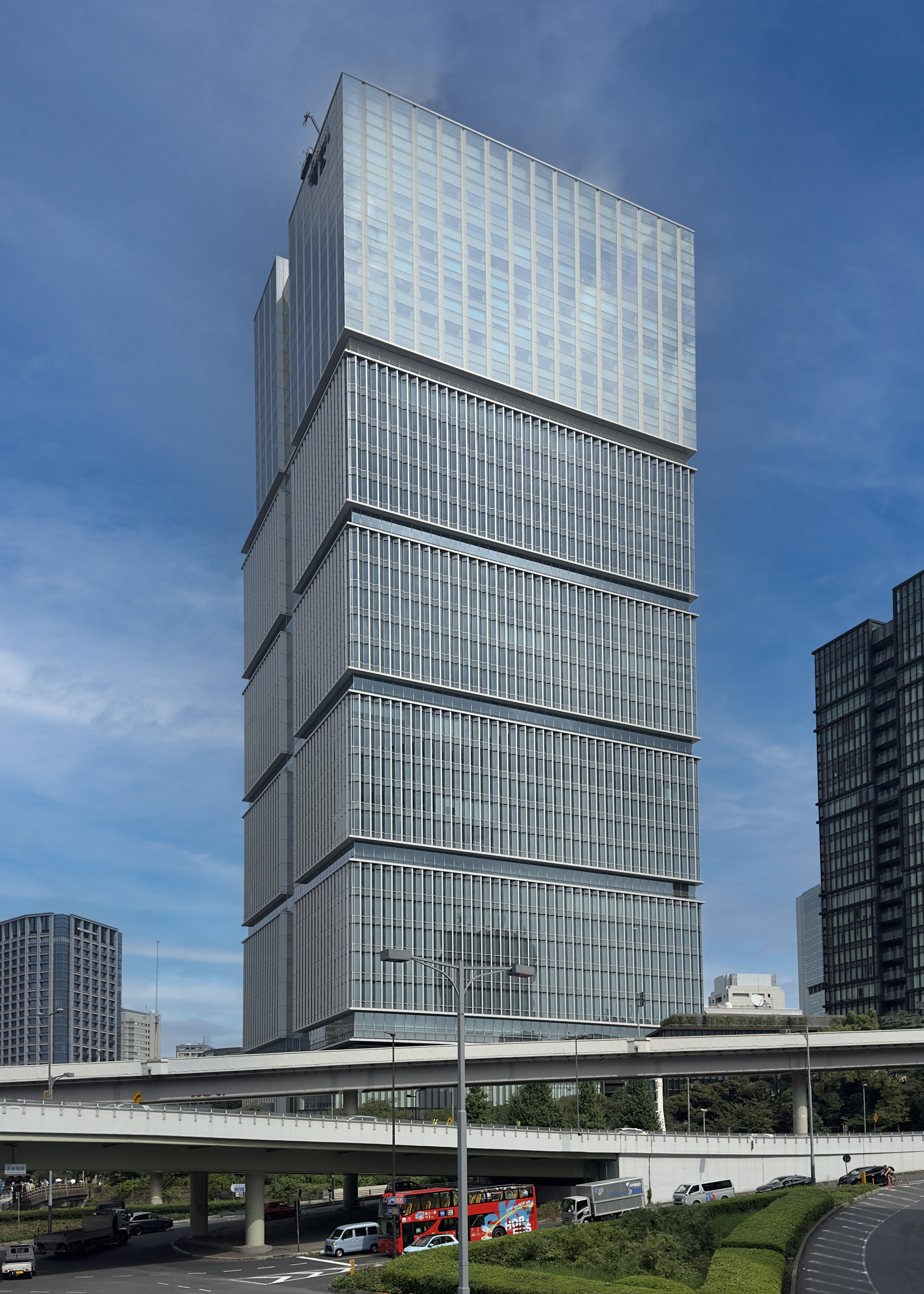
Tokyo Garden Terrace Kioicho

Yahoo! and SoftBank formed Yahoo! Japan in January 1996 to establish the first web portal in Japan. Yahoo! Japan went live on April 1, 1996. Yahoo! Japan was listed on JASDAQ in November 1997. In January 2000, it became the first stock in Japanese history to trade for more than ¥100 million per share. The company was listed on the Tokyo Stock Exchange in October 2003 and became part of the Nikkei 225 stock market index in 2005.

Yahoo! Japan acquired the naming rights for the Fukuoka Dome in 2005, renaming the dome as the "Fukuoka Yahoo! Japan Dome". The "Yahoo Dome" is the home field for the Fukuoka SoftBank Hawks, a professional baseball team, majorly owned by SoftBank.

In 2017, Verizon Communications completed its acquisition of Yahoo's core internet business for approximately $4.83 billion in cash. Yahoo's operating business, which included popular products like Yahoo Mail, Yahoo Finance, and Tumblr, was merged with Verizon's existing media subsidiary AOL to form a new subsidiary called Oath (later renamed Verizon Media).

However, the acquisition did not include Yahoo's stakes in Alibaba Group, Yahoo Japan, or other minority investments. These assets remained under Yahoo, which was renamed Altaba and became a publicly traded investment company. Importantly, Yahoo Japan, which had operated as a separate joint venture, was not affected by Verizon's acquisition of Yahoo's core business. Yahoo Japan continued to use the Yahoo brand and operate independently.

The deal marked the end of Yahoo's run as an independent company after over 20 years. Despite the acquisition, Yahoo Japan remained a separate entity, maintaining its own branding and operations distinct from Verizon's ownership of Yahoo's U.S. business.

Yahoo Japan discontinued access in the European Economic Area and the UK on 6 April 2022, due to "excessive regulatory burden".

Yahoo Japan, whose partnership with Google on search engine technology is set to expire in 2025, is considering switching to South Korean company Naver's search engine technology.

=== Design ===
Yahoo! Japan continues to use a site design similar to the one used internationally prior to 2007, as well as the red Yahoo logo that was used by the international Yahoo brand before 2013. The company has maintained a consistent look and feel over the years, even as the international Yahoo brand has changed.

== Search engine ==
Since 2010, Yahoo! Japan's search engine has been based on Google's search technology. In exchange, Google receives user activity data from Yahoo! Japan's various products.

The Yahoo! Japan search engine was a directory-type search engine, similar to Yahoo! in the United States. A crawler-type search engine was used as well, and as the popularity of the crawler-type search engine gradually increased, after October 3, 2005, Yahoo! Japan began utilizing only the crawler-type engine. On June 29, 2017, Yahoo! Japan announced that the directory-based search engine "Yahoo! Category", which had been in operation since its establishment, would be abolished on March 29, 2018.

As a crawler-type search engine, Yahoo! Japan initially used technology from the Japanese company Goo, which used Google's technology. The company later switched to using Yahoo Search Technology (YST), developed by Yahoo! in the US. In addition to serving as a standard search engine, Yahoo! Japan partnered with Twitter to provide real-time search for tweets. It also receives data feeds from partner companies; Cookpad and Naver information is displayed in search results. Yahoo! Search Custom Search was discontinued on March 31, 2019.

== Services ==
Yahoo! Japan currently offers various web-based services and apps for its customers, including the following:

- Ymobile: Ymobile Corporation (ワイモバイル株式会社), stylized Y!mobile, is a subsidiary of Japanese telecommunications company SoftBank Group Corporation that provides mobile telecommunications and ADSL services. The current CEO of the company is Ken Miyauchi. It was formed in 2014 through the merger of Willcom and eAccess, and uses the Y! moniker brand from Yahoo! Japan, which is partly owned by SoftBank.
- Yahoo! Japan Mail: maintains the classic look of Yahoo! Mail, but remains a separate service operated in Japan. Another notable change is the 10 GB storage limit, in contrast to Yahoo! Mail's 1 TB of storage and its former unlimited-storage offering.
- Yahoo! Japan Auctions (ヤフオク！): Japan's largest Internet auction service. Previously known as Yahoo! Auction and Yafuoku.
- Yahoo! Japan T-Point: A rewards program that allows users to earn and redeem points for goods or cash.
- Yahoo! Premium: A paid service allowing users to obtain certain benefits, including the ability to bid on certain auction listings, and various premium features with Yahoo! Wallet (which can be used in conjunction with Japan Net Bank, Mitsubishi UFJ Bank, and Rakuten Bank) and Yahoo! points.

Other Yahoo! Japan services include or have included Yahoo! Japan Bookstore, Yahoo! Japan News, Yahoo! Japan GeoCities (discontinued in March 2019), Yahoo! Japan Toto (a sports lottery site), Yahoo! Japan GyaO (a video on-demand service, discontinued in March 2023), Yahoo! Shopping, Yahoo! Travel, Yahoo! Roko (a mapping and review service), Yahoo! Box (a cloud storage service), Yahoo! Mobage (a social networking service), Yahoo! Wisdom Bag (similar to Yahoo! Answers), and Yahoo! Browser (an android–based web browser).

From April 6, 2022, the home page blocked users from the EEA and the UK, apparently due to the General Data Protection Regulation. Some subsidiary services such as Yahoo! JAPAN Mail remained functional, although limited.

== Gallery ==
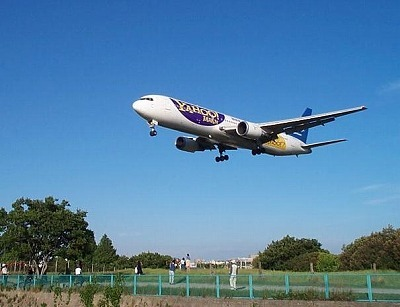
A Yahoo! JAPAN-branded Boeing 767 operated by Skymark Airlines at Osaka International Airport in 2000

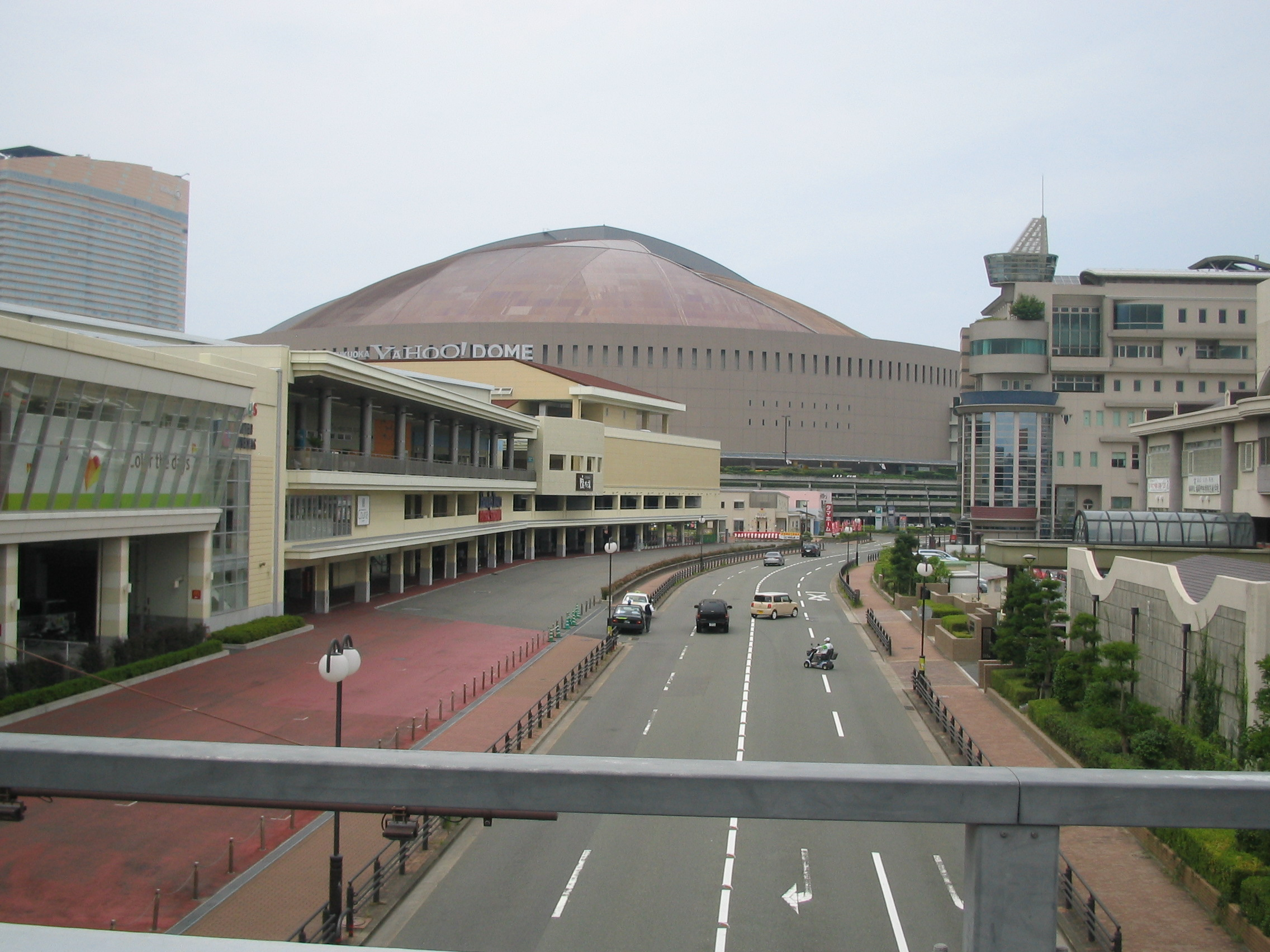
The Fukuoka Yahoo! JAPAN Dome, home of the Fukuoka SoftBank Hawks baseball team

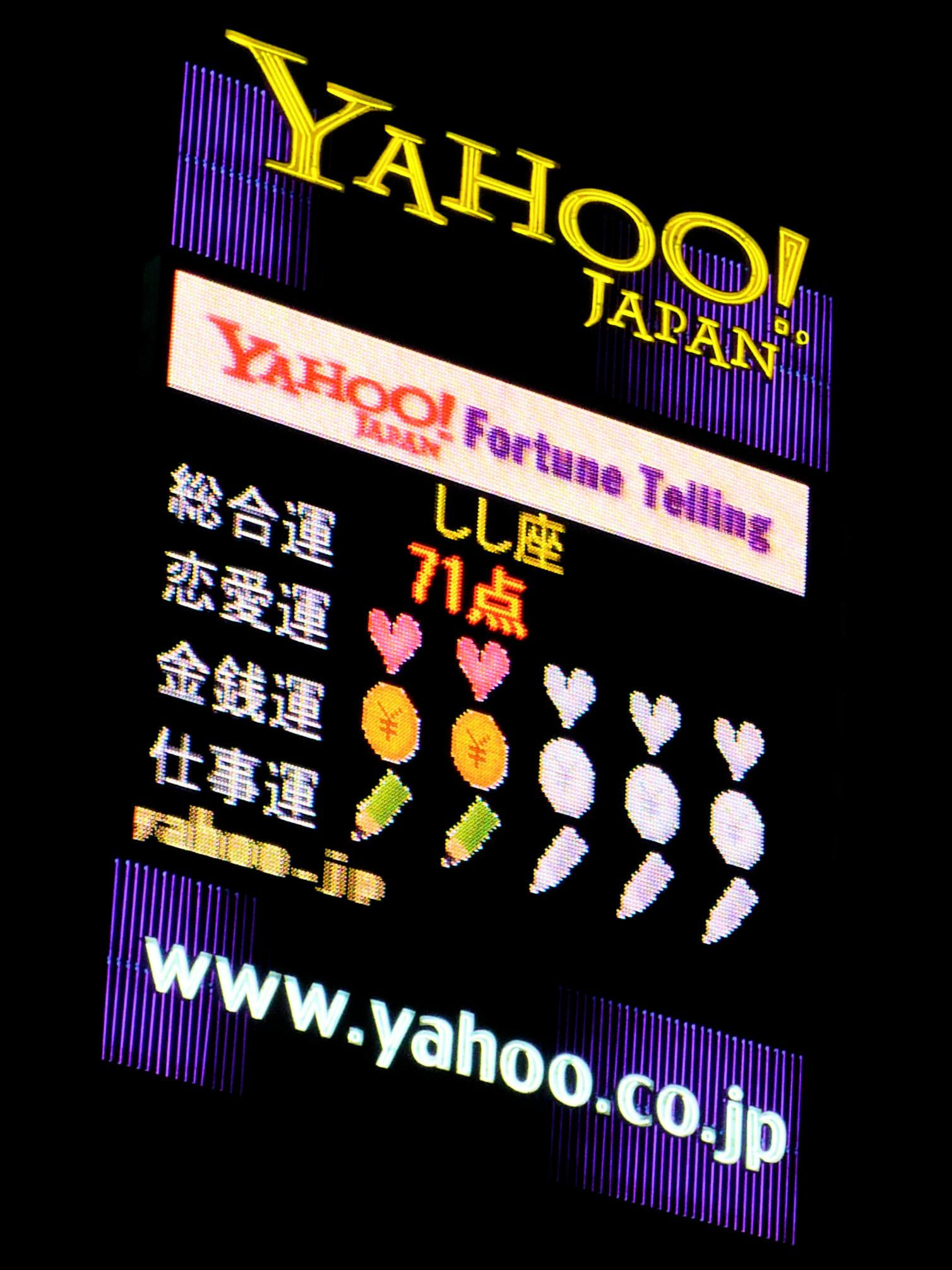
Yahoo! JAPAN neon sign in Roppongi, Tokyo

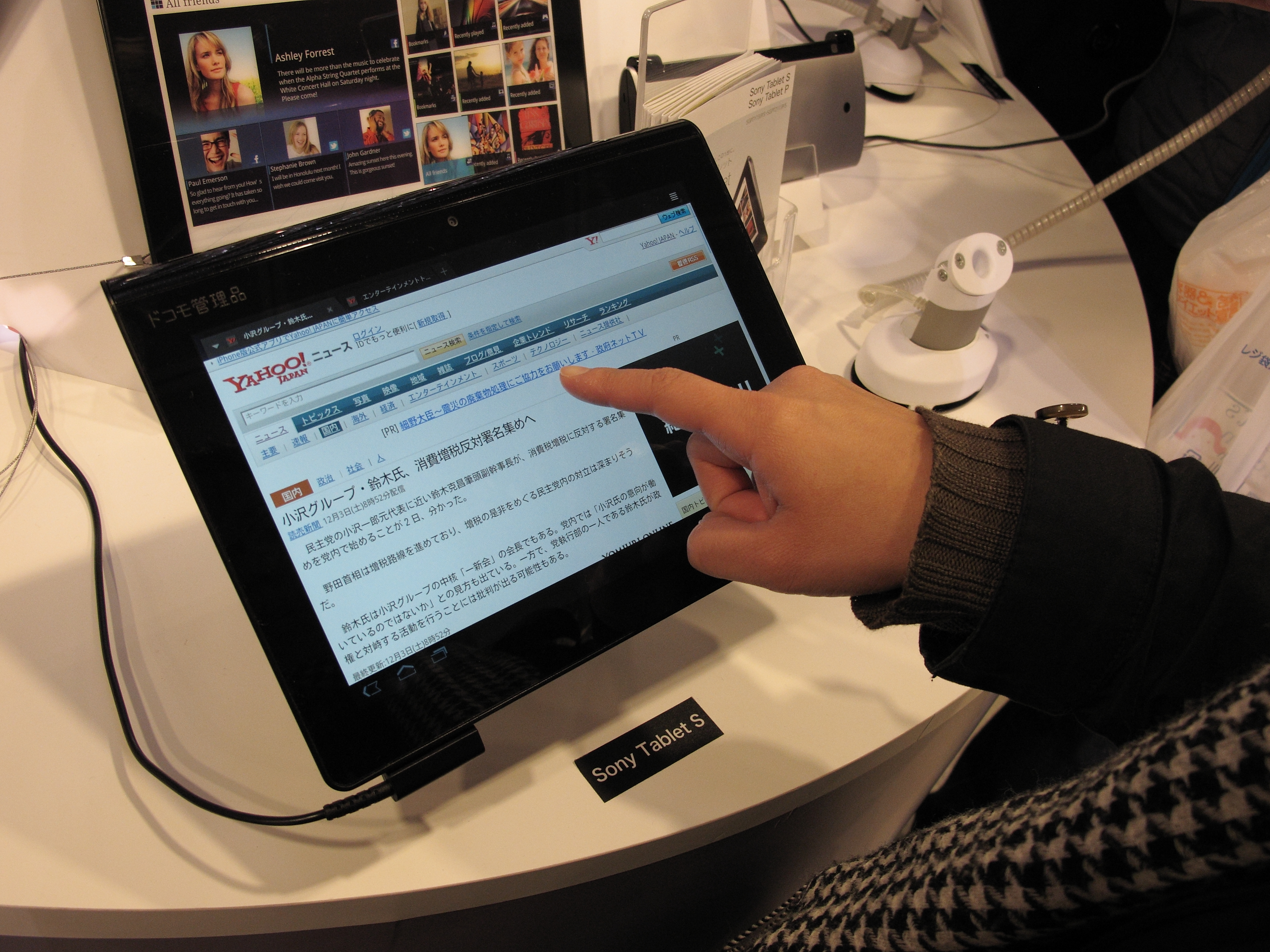
Yahoo! JAPAN website on a Sony Tablet S

== See also ==
- Comparison of web search engines
- List of search engines
- Search engine
- Timeline of web search engines
- Yahoo! Japan Search Awards
