= RidePal =

Company

- Industry: Service
- Founded: 2011
- Headquarters: San Francisco, California
- Key people: Brian Moore CEO, Dominic Haigh CRO, Bob Martin CMO, Paul Davis, Operations
- Products: Corporate Commuter Bus / Shuttle Services
- Parent: Bauer Transportation
- Website: ridepal.com

RidePal offers corporate luxury commute bus services for companies and individuals in the San Francisco Bay Area and Los Angeles.

== History ==
The genesis for RidePal came from co-founder Nathalie Criou's experience commuting from San Francisco to her job at Google in Mountain View on Google-provided buses, then losing access to the bus service when she moved to another job.

The cleantech business incubator Greenstart selected RidePal as one of 5 companies out of 152 applicants for its second accelerator program in February 2012. In August 2012 RidePal closed a seed investment round of $500,000. Investors included Jeff Clarke, 500 Startups and Lisa Gansky.

In August 2012 RidePal added four new routes to its network. The Mayor of Palo Alto, Greg Scharff, said at the September 2013 launch of RidePal's service to Palo Alto from San Francisco: "This service takes cars off the road and allows for more growth. You're allowing Silicon Valley to grow - thanks for that".

In September 2013 RidePal announced Series A funding of $3.2m led by Nat Goldhaber of Claremont Creek Ventures and Volvo Venture Capital Group, and stated that they have over 30 customers including Intuit, Groupon and Clinovo

In October 2014, RidePal partnered with YP to launch its first shared Los Angeles route, with service from West LA to and from Glendale. This brought the total number of active service routes to 26.

On June 25, 2015, RidePal announced that they had run out of funding and would cease operations. Bauer Transportation purchased the service in 2015 and states that 'It Has Returned'.

== Services ==
RidePal works on a shared mobility or collaborative consumption model for corporate commuters, with route planning based on commuter demand and geography, as well as corporate recruiting priorities. On different lines, employees can be picked up by a RidePal bus and are taken to their place of work.

The company's services focus on businesses that are interested in offering their employees the advantages of commute alternatives but don't have the resources or interest in building their own infrastructure.

The RidePal buses have been called luxurious: They offer between 30-40 seats, provide more space than regular vehicles and offer other features like leather seats and Wi-Fi. Rides can be paid for with company provided credit or individual payments, e.g. via credit card. Public lines can thus also be used by individuals whose companies don't work with RidePal. In 2015 a ride in the Bay Area was between $4.75 and $12 per ride.

According to the company, it serves more than 500 clients.
