= CLS Communication =

Swiss translation and writing services company

- Industry: Writing, Editing, Translation
- Founded: 1997
- Headquarters: Zurich, Switzerland
- Key people: Doris Albisser, Founder; Pius Fellner, Country Manager
- Number of employees: about 100 in Switzerland
- Parent: Lionbridge
- Website: https://www.cls-communication.com/en http://www.cls-lexitech.ca/

CLS Communication, now named Lionbridge Switzerland AG, is a language translation, editing and writing services company based in Switzerland. It has 19 offices on three continents, and serves the financial services, life sciences, telecommunications and legal industries.

In November 2018, CLS Communication was renamed and is now called Lionbridge Switzerland AG.

As of 2020, the company employs approximately 20 in-house translators in Switzerland and has a network of 2,400 external partners. According to its website, as of 2011 CLS Communication has more than 900 clients.

== History ==
CLS Communication was created in 1997 as a spin-off from Swiss Bank Corporation (now UBS) and Zurich Financial Services. In 2002, the company in-sourced the translation teams of Swisscom and Sunrise, Switzerland's two leading telecommunications companies, and the translation unit of the Raiffeisen banking group in Switzerland, setting up offices in London and New York. It acquired London-based Richard Gray Financial Translations (RGFT) in 2004, and added offices in Paris and Madrid. Offices in Copenhagen, Frankfurt Singapore, Hong Kong, Shanghai and Beijing were added. The firm also took over the language services teams of Swiss Re, Lombard Odier, and Danske Bank.

In 2003, CLS became fully independent through a management buyout. In 2009 it gained a new majority shareholder, the Swiss-based private equity fund Zurmont Madison, through a capital increase and a partial buyout of existing shareholders. The firm then acquired the Canadian translation firm Lexi-tech International (formerly owned by J.D. Irving), and the Danish Scandinavian Translators.

In January 2013, the firm acquired technical documentation translation specialist, 4-Text GmbH, a company based in Berlin, Germany employing over 60 permanent staff and 200 freelance translators.

According to the report "The Language Services Market: 2013" by Donald A. DePalma and Vijayalaxmi Hegde, published by Common Sense Advisory, CLS Communication is the 11th largest global language service provider.

Doris Albisser led CLS Communication as Group CEO for 16 years until August 2013, when she handed over operational management to her Group CFO and long-time deputy, Matthias Trümpy, and assumed the Vice-Chairmanship of the Board of Directors. Under Doris Albisser's leadership, the company grew from an internal bank translation unit into one of the top ten global language service providers. The company now, has over 600 internal staff and a network of some 5,000 freelancers worldwide.

In January 2015, CLS Communication was acquired by Lionbridge Technologies, Inc., a global translation company based in Waltham, Massachusetts.

In July 2015, Matthias Trümpy handed over the CEO position to Tom Spel.

In July 2017, Markus Hacker took over from Tom Spel as General Manager for Central Europe.

Pius Fellner took on the operational management of the Swiss business of Lionbridge and CLS Communication as of 1 September 2018.

In November 2018, CLS Communication moved over to the Lionbridge name and brand.

== Services ==
Besides the firm's core business in writing, editing and translating, it also has a terminology department that helps clients set up their own corporate dictionaries and organise their linguistic assets, and offers a machine translation tool.

A niche area in which the firm operates is the European standard Undertakings for Collective Investment in Transferable Securities Directives (UCITS IV), which aims to allow collective investment schemes to operate freely throughout the European Union on the basis of a single authorisation from one member state. CLS also translates annual reports for companies.

== Certifications ==
CLS Communication is ISO 9001:2008 and DIN EN 15038:2006 certified. A number of branches are certified in accordance with these standards.
