= Cucumbertown =

Food blogging platform (Defunct)

- Company type: Defunct
- Website type: Food Blogging Platform
- Headquarters: Palo Alto, California; Bangalore, India.
- No. of locations: 2
- Founders: Cherian Thomas, Chris Luscher, Arun Prabhakar, Dan Hauk
- CEO: Cherian Thomas
- Industry: Internet, Web Application
- Website: cucumbertown.com
- Launched: October 17, 2012

Cucumbertown was a food blogging platform. Based out of Palo Alto, California, it was founded by Cherian Thomas, Chris Luscher, Arun Prabhakar and Dan Hauk. It was acquired by Japanese recipe network Cookpad in June 2015.

The platform shut down in 2016.

== Product ==
Cucumbertown formerly allowed users to post and browse recipes in its web based platform. It claimed to have made it easy to write recipes in a more structured way, a style opposed to the normal way to publishing recipes through blogging platforms like WordPress or tumblr in blob formats. It also allowed users to write a variation on an existing recipe's page. The website was for some time a library of recipes written by food enthusiasts from different parts of the world, but no data is hosted at the site today.

- Analytics Dashboard: Through the dashboard, people were able to see their traffic report, blog ranking vis-a-vis other food blogs in the world and a breakdown of individual post performance.
- Recipe Writer: A food blogging specific editor with inbuilt SEO parameters.
- Customised Recipe Search: A recipe search feature within the platform that has filters for cooking time, cuisine, ease etc.

== Background and history ==
Cucumbertown was co-founded by Ex-Zynga employee Cherian Thomas, Chris Luscher, a partner at Web development firm Information Architects, Arun Prabhakar, a software engineer, and Dan Hauk, Tumblr theme designer. Cherian Thomas, an engineer based in Bangalore was passionate about food and he kept recording his thoughts on cooking and publishing systematically. Thomas, once, e-mailed Chris Luscher, partner of Information Architects, one of the leading design firms in the world, based in Zurich. Chris Luscher shared his passion in cooking and agreed to partner with him. Thomas then brought on board Arun Prabhakar, his junior at Model Engineering College, and Dan Hauk, a leading American designer. Cucumbertown is named after a mythical town, Vellarikka Pattanam (വെള്ളരിക്കാപ്പട്ടണം) in the Malayalam language. Most of the founders, a team of 4 people across 3 continents, never met face to face until the launch of the company. Dan Hauk left Cucumbertown in August 2013.

In 2012, Cucumbertown was angel funded to the extent of $300,000 by investors such as Naval Ravikant of AngelList, Paul Singh of 500 Startups, Farmville co-creator Sizhao Zao Yang, founder of MightyText Maneesh Arora, early Google product guy Richard Chen and Sonique Player co-creator Tabreez Varjee. This was followed by an undisclosed 2nd round of investment by Ludlow Ventures in 2014.

Cucumbertown is a US incorporated company with an Indian subsidiary and with two offices, one in Palo Alto, California, and another in Bangalore, India. Cucumbertown has reportedly users from 60 countries, the largest audience, after the US, is from Australia and the UAE.

The Economic Times showcased Cucumbertown as "one of the 14 startups to look forward to in 2014".

In October 2014, Cucumbertown released RecipeWriter, a user-friendly tool to add recipes. From late 2014, the company shifted its focus into becoming a food blogging platform.

In June 2015, it was announced that Cucumbertown, world's only niche food blogging platform, had been acquired by Japanese Recipe network, Cookpad in an undisclosed deal.
