= Lionbridge =

American translation and localisation company

Lionbridge Technologies, Inc.
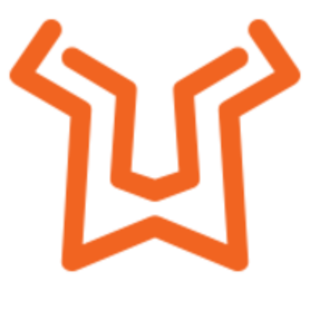

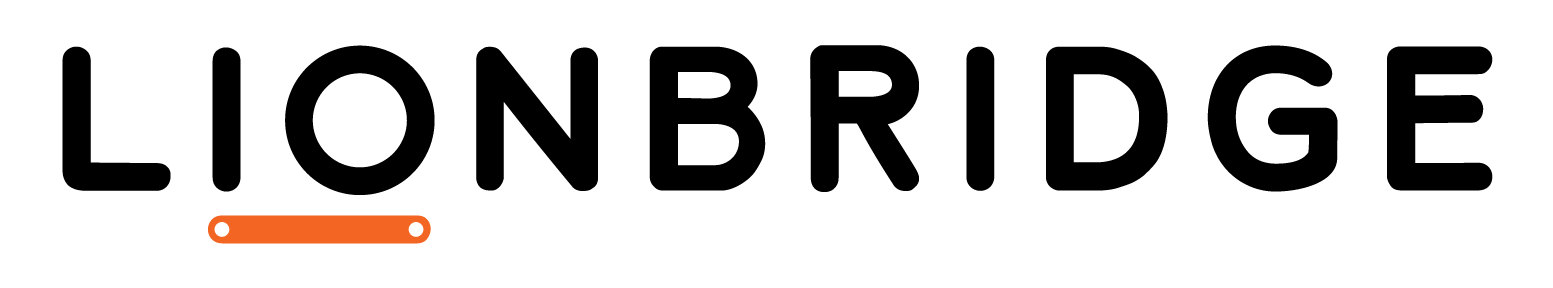
- Type: Private
- Traded as: Nasdaq: LIOX
- Industry: Language localization Software testing E-learning
- Founded: 1996; 30 years ago in Waltham, Massachusetts, United States
- Founder: Rory Cowan
- Headquarters: Waltham, Massachusetts, United States
- Area served: Worldwide
- Key people: John Fennelly (CEO)
- Number of employees: 6,000
- Website: www.lionbridge.com

Lionbridge Technologies, Inc. is an American multinational company that provides translation and localization services. Based in Waltham, Massachusetts, the company has operations in 26 countries.

== History ==
Lionbridge was founded in 1996. In 2005, they acquired Bowne Global Solutions, then the largest localization provider. In 2014 they acquired Darwin Zone, a digital marketing services agency based in Costa Rica, and Clay Tablet Technologies, a content connectivity software firm.

In 2015, they acquired Zurich-based CLS Communication, a translation services provider, and Geotext, a legal translation company. In December 2016, it was announced that Lionbridge entered into a definitive agreement to be acquired by H.I.G. Capital. The deal was announced closed in May, 2017 and, subsequently, the company was delisted from Nasdaq. Lionbridge is now a privately held company and part of the portfolio of H.I.G. companies.

In July 2017, John Fennelly was named chief executive officer. The founder of the company, Rory Cowan, is chairman of the board of directors.

In December 2018, Lionbridge fully acquired Tokyo-based Gengo, a crowdsourced translation and artificial intelligence training data provider.

In November 2020, Lionbridge agreed with Telus International to sell its artificial intelligence division.

In September 2022, Lionbridge acquired Game Tester, a community-based game testing platform based out of Melbourne, Australia.

In August 2024, Lionbridge launched Aurora Studio, a community-based AI testing platform based out of Waltham, Massachusetts, United States.

== Operations ==
Lionbridge provides translation and localization in many languages, with offices in 26 countries. It serves clients such as the U.S. Department of Homeland Security and Government of Canada.

== Controversies and court cases ==
A securities class action lawsuit involving the company was filed in July 2001 under "Samet v. Lionbridge Technologies, Inc. et al." in the United States District Court for the Southern District of New York.

In 2006, a Lionbridge employee was awarded non economic damages of US$366,250 and economic damages of US$221,433 due to failure by the company to fulfill its obligation to help the employee obtain a green card.

A 2008 court case involved an unfair dismissal claim by a former Lionbridge employee fired for union recruitment activities at the company's Warsaw office to protect employment conditions. Protests in support were held in Denmark, Spain, Poland, and Ireland.

In 2014, 38 software testers contracting for Microsoft in the Bellevue, Washington office formed Temporary Workers Alliance, a trade union. A year later, Microsoft required Lionbridge to provide at least 3 weeks of vacation. In 2016, Lionbridge announced layoffs, two months after the union had ratified their first collective agreement. As part of the negotiations, the union had agreed to drop a joint employer case against Lionbridge and Microsoft.

In June 2024, an unfair labor practice was filed against the Lionbridge by the Communications Workers of America, alleging that the company illegally terminated the employment of 160 workers in Boise, Idaho who worked as software testers for Activision, in retaliation for exercising their right to participate in concerted union activities. As part of the layoff, CWA also alleges that workers were required to sign an overly broad confidentiality agreement and an illegal waiver of certain rights protected by the National Labor Relations Act.
