= Visual.ly =

Community platform for data visualization and infographics

Visually
- Website type: Infographics & Data Visualizations
- Available in: English
- Owner: ScribbleLive
- Key people: Vince Mifsud, CEO
- Website: visual.ly
- Commercial: Yes
- Launched: 2011
- Current status: Active

Visual.ly is a community platform for data visualization and infographics. It was founded by Stew Langille, Lee Sherman, Tal Siach, and Adam Breckler in 2011.

== History ==
Visual.ly was inspired by the founders’ time at Mint.com. As Mint's Director of Marketing, Langille noticed that the infographics posted to MintLife, the company blog, generated 30 times more traffic than a comparable text article. According to Langille, “we knew we were onto something big.”

In April 2011, Langille, along with MintLife's Editor-in-Chief Lee Sherman and Adam Breckler, a Mint web developer, left Mint.com to co-found Visual.ly with Tal Siach, the founder of Walyou, an Israeli gadget site. Langille states that Visual.ly works towards evolving how digital news media outlets present information, similar to how USA Today’s weather infographics transformed news outlets in the early ‘90s and how Wired’s graphic design influenced digital media in the early 2000s.

In October 2011, Visual.ly announced a $2 million round in seed funding, led by Crosslink Capital, 500 Startups, and SoftTech. At the time of the announcement, Visual.ly had 26,000 users, 7,000 infographics, and 1 million monthly page views. They have partnered with The Atlantic, BuzzFeed, AskMen, CNNMoney, and National Geographic, among other media outlets, to provide infographics and data visualizations.

== Site structure ==
Visual.ly is structured both as a showcase for infographics as well as a marketplace and community for publishers, designers, and researchers. The site allows users to search images through description, tags, and sources in a variety of categories, ranging from Education to Business or Politics. Users can publish infographics to their personal profile, which they can subsequently share through their social networks.

Visual.ly maintains a team of data analysts, journalists, and designers that create infographics and data visualizations using the Visual.ly tools. They are currently developing a tool that allows anyone to create and publish their own data visualizations. Through this tool, users will be able to gather information from databases and APIs in an automated service (meaning that users only need to specify the kind of information they want to visually display) to produce an infographic. Visual.ly's first tool, the Twitter Visualizer tool allows users to input the Twitter handles of two people, and then generates an infographic comparing the hobbies, number of followers and occupation of the two accounts. CBC used this feature to compare leading politicians.

== Reception ==
Visual.ly's infographics have been featured on NPR, The Huffington Post and CNN. They were named as one of Inc. Magazine’s 10 new web tools to make life easier. Their YouTube channel has received over 100,000 views.
