= Platzi =

Online education platform

Platzi (originally Mejorando.la) is a Colombian educational platform founded by the entrepreneur Freddy Vega and the programmer Christian Van Der Henst in 2011.

== History ==
Platzi was founded in Colombia by Freddy Vega and Christian Van Der Henst in 2014. Both met as competitors in their former companies: Cristalab and Maestros del Web. The company was born from a livestream weekly show called “Mejorando.la”, before becoming "Platzi" in 2015, partially to make the company more amenable to international consumers.

In 2015 it received its first venture capital funding. Initial offices for the company were in Bogota, Colombia, and Mexico City, Mexico. In 2014 the co-founders moved to San Francisco after being accepted to Y Combinator Winter 2015 program in Silicon Valley, becoming the first company targeting Latin American to be accepted to the incubator. In the same year it raised $2.1 million from funds like Omidyar Network and 500 Startups.

In 2018, the company raised a $6.1 million Series A from Foundation Capital and it expanded to Spain and Brazil.

The company had 119 employees in 2019 and the founders were awarded the "Entrepreneurs of the Year" prize by Endeavor in the same year.

== Courses ==
The platform uses video and interactive lessons to teach tangible skills rather than academic education, in Spanish, English and Portuguese. Platzi creates the courses, hires instructors and does the recording of the lessons. Many instructors are not professional teachers, but subject matter experts and professionals in the field they are teaching about, like YC's Sam Altman, Wufoo's Kevin Hale and Moz's co-founder Rand Fishkin. A sampling of courses available as of 2018 were Programming Foundations, Internet Of Things, Mathematics for Programming, Facebook Ads Platform, Google Cloud Platform, IBM Cloud, Interface Design, and Development with Unity.

Platzi has also created employee training courses for corporations, including Microsoft, IBM, Facebook and Google. It has also launched free educational campaigns during elections to provide voters with information about the different parties, issues, and candidates, in addition to days on which anyone can use their lessons for free. In 2015 Platzi began offering English lessons. In addition to its courses, Platzi runs conferences and news broadcast channels for the tech world.

== Students ==
As of 2017 the platform had about 370,000 students, mainly in Mexico, Colombia, Spain, and the United States. In 2018 the platform had 600,000 students. As of 2019 the platform had more than one million students, 150,000 of which were located in Colombia, and the rest in other countries. Those that complete Platzi courses receive a certificate; the platform has a 70% completion rate among its students.

In 2019, Platzi launched 1,000 scholarships in collaboration with Facebook for Brazilian, Colombian and Mexican students from underrepresented populations in technology. It also launched 3,000 scholarships for Colombians in poverty with the Ministry of Technology of Colombia.

== Administration ==
Christian Van Der Henst is the COO and became the president of Platzi in 2015. The CEO of the company is co-founder Freddy Vega.

== Sponsorship ==
Between 2021 and 2022, Platzi was the main kit sponsor of Spanish football club Granada.
