= Eat App =

Restaurant reservation software company

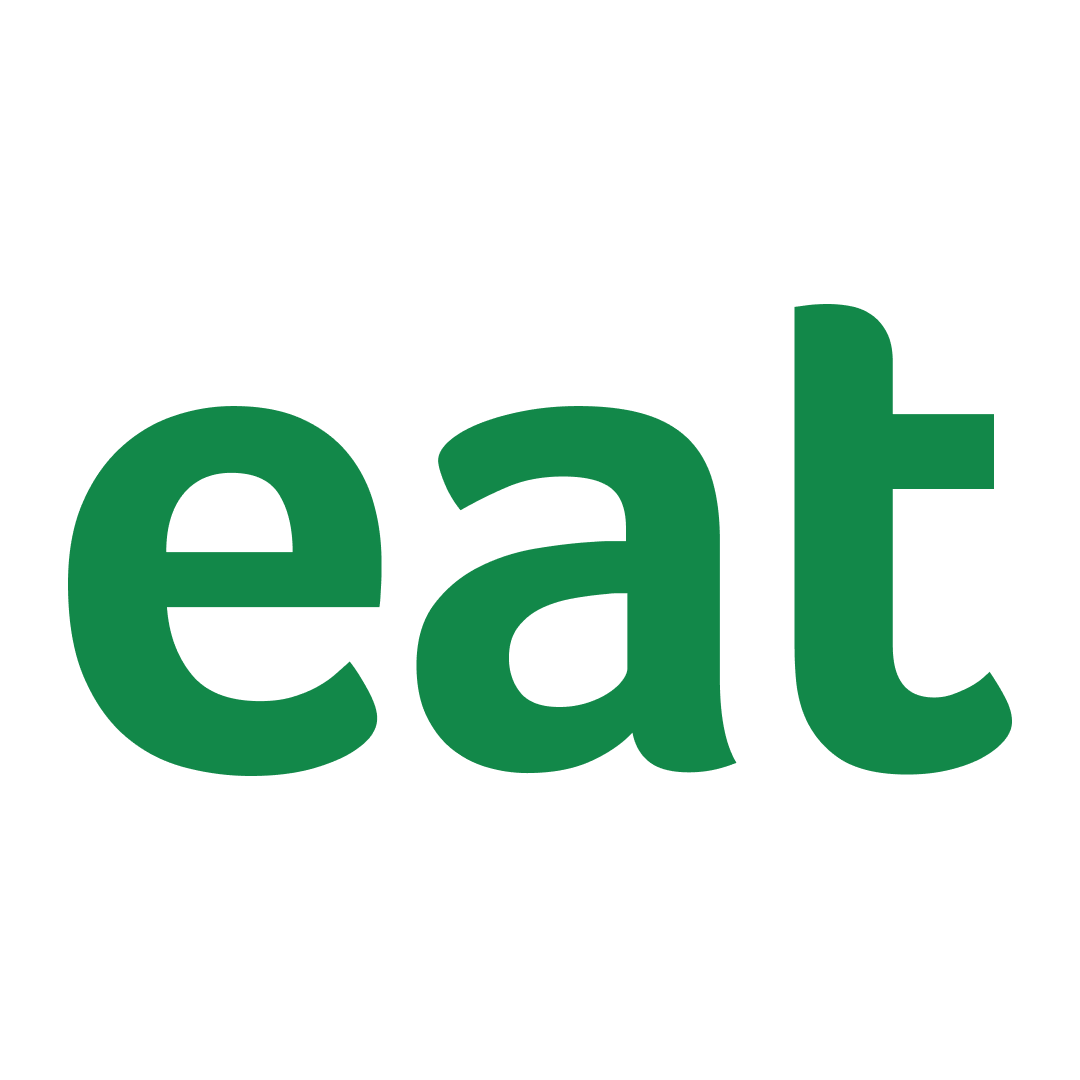
- Industry: Internet
- Founded: February 2015
- Founder: Nezar Kadhem, David Feuillard
- Headquarters: UAE and US
- Number of locations: Remote
- Area served: Worldwide
- Products: Online restaurant reservations, Restaurant Table Management, Restaurant CRM.
- Number of employees: 50-100
- Website: restaurant.eatapp.co

Eat App is a global restaurant technology company that provides a cloud-based management platform for restaurants, hotels, and other venues. The platform enables venues to accept online reservations seamlessly, manage tables, and enhance customer relationship management (CRM).

The company also offers a consumer app and website for discovering and booking restaurant tables online. According to the company, the system has seated over 100 million guests, and the number continues to grow.

Eat App was founded by Nezar Kadhem and David Feuillard in 2015 and has raised over $23 million to date from Silicon Valley's 500 startups, Middle East Venture Partners (MEVP), Derayah VC, PSG Equity amongst other business angels. The company is currently operational across the world, with offices in Dubai and the United States.

== Product overview ==
=== For restaurants ===
Eat App’s reservation system allows for a digital record of all reservations, all guests that have previously visited the restaurant, as well as analytics on the performance of the restaurant. The table management feature simplifies traditional restaurant operations by providing a live snapshot of current status, seating optimization, and shift management.

The CRM and analytics suite gathers and monitors data to build a segmented guestbook for personalized marketing and provides dashboards for data-driven decision-making. Additionally, the review feature makes it easy for restaurants to automatically collect reviews from their guests.

Additionally, Eat App includes a chit printer function that seamlessly prints reservation details at host stands and a review management feature that allows restaurants to manage online reviews directly within the platform.

== History ==
In February 2015, Eat App raised $300k from Bahrain-based business angel group TENMOU.

In June 2018, Eat raised $1.2 million from Dubai-based Middle East Venture Partners (MEVP).

In February 2020, Eat App raised $5 million in a Series B funding round led by 500 Startups, Derayah Venture Fund, and MEVP, with participation from a few angel investors and family members.

In February 2021, Eat App launched its technology with The Emaar Hospitality Group, implementing it across over 50 restaurants in Emaar properties and hotels. The cloud-based system runs natively on iPads in each restaurant, providing Emaar staff access to reservations and guest information, and integrates with the U by Emaar loyalty app to personalize service.

On September 28, 2022, Eat App announced the closing of an $11 million Series B funding round. The investment was led by Middle East Venture Partners (MEVP), 500 Startups, Derayah Venture Capital, Dallah Albaraka, Ali Zaid Al Quraishi & Brothers Company, and Rasameel Investment Company, with participation from existing investors.

In early 2026, the company announced they acquired ReserveGo, a B2B table reservation platform in India that was serving over 1,000 restaurants.

In January 2026, Eat App raised $10 million in a Series B extension round led by PSG Equity through its portfolio company Zenchef SAS, bringing total funding to more than $23 million. At the same time, the company also partnered with Swiggy, an Indian food delivery and restaurant discovery platform, under which Eat App's reservation and table management software is marketed to restaurants on Swiggy's network.
