= Tilo Bonow =

Investor & Entrepreneur

- Born: 7 January 1980 (age 46); Potsdam
- Occupations: Tech investor, entrepreneur

Tilo Bonow (born 7 January 1980 in Potsdam) is a German tech investor and entrepreneur. He is the founder and CEO of the communications agency Piabo and a speaker at Startup and tech conferences.

== Career ==
=== Early career and founding Piabo ===
From 2002 to 2006, Bonow was Head of Corporate Communications at Jamba! where he worked with the Samwer brothers. Prior to joining Jamba, he worked at the advertising agency O.T.W. and as a freelance consultant in the field of online marketing.

In 2006, Bonow founded Piabo, a Berlin-based PR agency specializing in tech companies, which is now one of the market leaders in Europe. His portfolio includes Tinder, GitHub, Shopify, Stripe, Silicon Valley Bank, wework, Samsung, and BMW. Initially, Bonow was active with Piabo in Europe, then also in North America - especially the Silicon Valley - until he began to expand into China in 2015.

=== Investor ===
Bonow is an investor in and advisor to various venture capital companies. His focus is on Startups with a tech focus. He primarily supports European companies financially and with his business expertise.

He has been an investor in Cavalry Ventures since its founding in 2016. He is also an investor in 500 Startups and serves as a member of the investment committee at 3VC (formerly Capital 300). He has invested with Cocoon Capital Management, a Singapore-based venture capital firm, and Unlock Venture Partners, a Seattle-based venture capital firm. In 2019, he began investing with Headline (formerly Infinity Ventures), a Japanese VC firm.

=== Speaker ===
Bonow is a speaker at tech conferences, including the NOAH Conference in London and Berlin, the Mobile World Congress in Shanghai and Barcelona, the Bits & Pretzels Conference in Munich, the Digital Life Design (DLD) Conference, the Plug & Play Conference, and at The Next Web in Amsterdam.

In April 2021, he spoke at the online EU Startup Summit.

In 2020, Bonow spoke at Chatbot Summit, a conference specializing in conversational A.I. (artificial intelligence), among other events. In November 2020, he was a speaker at Ecosummit and in December 2020, he was a keynote speaker at Uppstart, a Swedish tech startup conference. Furthermore, he was an invited speaker as a scene expert at the NEXT Conference in Hamburg and at the German Tech Conference 2020. In 2017, he spoke at the Startupnight conference. In July 2014, he was a speaker at DLDwomen in Munich.

=== Other membership and engagements ===
Since 2013, Bonow has been a mentor at Microsoft Ventures Accelerator Berlin and at Axel Springer Plug & Play Accelerator, a joint venture. Since August 2014, he has served as an advisor at IBM Smart Camp, a global program that brings together entrepreneurs, investors, and mentors. IBM Smart Camp is headquartered in Waltham, Massachusetts. He is also a mentor at ProSiebenSat.1 Accelerator and APX, the joint start-up program of Porsche and Axel Springer Verlag.

== Publications ==
- Light your fire! Personal Branding für Macher:innen und Visionär:innen. BusinessVillage, Göttingen 2021, ISBN 9783869805788.
- Do-it-yourself branding: Do-it-yourself-Markenbildung: eine Bedienungsanleitung. In: Stefanie Hoffmann-Palomino, Christine Kirbach, Bianca Praetorius (eds.): The LEAN BACK Perspective. Springer, Wiesbaden 2017, ISBN 9783658139247, pp. 339–348.
