= Cookpad =

Food tech company

Cookpad Inc.
- Type: Public KK
- Traded as: TYO: 2193
- Industry: Internet
- Founded: Kanagawa, Japan (1997)
- Headquarters: Tokyo, Japan,
- Key people: Akimitsu Sano (Founder & CEO)
- Revenue: ▲JPY 3,263 million (FY 2010)
- Operating income: ▲JPY 1,626 million (FY 2010)
- Net income: ▲JPY 847 million (FY 2010)
- Total assets: ▲JPY 4,508 million (FY 2010)
- Total equity: ▲JPY 3,479 million (FY 2010)
- Website: English corporate website

Cookpad Inc. is a Japanese food tech company. The company operates "Cookpad", which is Japan's largest recipe sharing service, with 60 million monthly unique users in Japan and 40 million monthly unique users globally, allowing visitors to upload and search through original, user-created recipes. The firm established its global headquarters in Bristol, UK, and is expanding its business into international markets with offices in the UK, Spain, Indonesia, Lebanon, Brazil, India, Taiwan, Hungary, Greece, Russia and elsewhere. As of 2021, its sites draw around 800 million page views each month. It went public on the Tokyo Stock Exchange in July 2009. As of December 2018, Cookpad had more than 5 million registered recipes.

== History ==
Coin Ltd., the predecessor to COOKPAD Inc., was established in October 1997. It launched “Kitchen@coin” as a sharing service for cooking in March 1998 and changed the services name to "COOKPAD" in June 1999. It started advertising business in March 2002. It launched a premium service in September 2004, the mobile service “MOBAREPI” in September 2006 and MOBAREPI's premium service in November 2008. Listed was on TSE Mothers in July 2009. In March 2010 it opened an office in California, USA and an office in Singapore in May 2011.

In June 2016 it Acquired Cucumbertown. In October 2017 it opened an office in Bristol, UK.
