= Act-Age =

Japanese manga series

- First tankōbon volume cover, featuring Kei Yonagi

アクタージュ (Akutāju)
- Genre: Drama
- Manga
- Written by: Tatsuya Matsuki
- Illustrated by: Shiro Usazaki
- Published by: Shueisha
- English publisher: NA: Viz Media (rescinded)
- Imprint: Jump Comics
- Magazine: Weekly Shōnen Jump
- English magazine: NA: Weekly Shonen Jump (rescinded)
- Original run: January 22, 2018 – August 11, 2020
- Volumes: 12
- icon

Act-Age (Japanese: アクタージュ, Hepburn: Akutāju) is a Japanese manga series written by Tatsuya Matsuki and illustrated by Shiro Usazaki. It was serialized in Shueisha's Weekly Shōnen Jump from January 2018 to August 2020, with its chapters collected into 12 tankōbon volumes. Act-Age was canceled and removed from the magazine and all official platforms after Matsuki's arrest in August 2020.

Viz Media published the first three chapters for its "Jump Start" initiative and then the series was simultaneously published from December 2018, after a restructuring of the English Shonen Jump. Shueisha also published the series in English on its Manga Plus platform from January 2019 to August 2020.

== Plot ==
The story focuses on Kei Yonagi, a high-school girl who strives to become an actress. She lives with her two younger siblings, after their father left them and their mother died. Kei has an extreme talent for method acting, to the point where she loses track of reality while acting. At an audition, some speculate that acting of this intensity could be self-destructive, and cite that as a reason for not accepting her. However, Kei catches the eye of the highly acclaimed director Sumiji Kuroyama, who steps forward with the intent of bringing out her full potential.

== Characters ==
Kei Yonagi (夜凪 景, Yonagi Kei)
A high-school girl who finds herself raising her younger siblings, Rui and Rei, on her own, after their father left them and their mother died. She has an innate talent for method acting, in which she uses memories from her own past to fully get into the role. However, her approach is extremely immersive, to the point where she gets lost in the role and becomes unable to distinguish fiction and reality.
Sumiji Kuroyama (黒山 墨字, Kuroyama Sumiji)
Director and the founder of Studio Daikokuten. He is famous overseas for his awards in various film festivals, but he is not as well known in Japan.
Yuki Hiiragi (柊 雪, Hiiragi Yuki)
Assistant director and filmmaker at Studio Daikokuten who works with Kuroyama. She is also a production manager and a talent manager for the studio.
Chiyoko Momoshiro (百城 千世子, Momoshiro Chiyoko)
Nicknamed "the Angel", a famous actor from the Stars Agency.
Arisa Hoshi (星 アリサ, Hoshi Arisa)
Founder and CEO of the Stars Agency.
Akira Hoshi (星 アキラ, Hoshi Akira)
Actor from the Stars Agency and the son of Arisa Hoshi.
Araya Myojin (明神 阿良也, Myōjin Araya)
A skilled stage play actor.

== Media ==
=== Manga ===
Written by Tatsuya Matsuki and illustrated by Shiro Usazaki, Act-Age was serialized in Shueisha's shōnen manga magazine Weekly Shōnen Jump from January 22, 2018, to August 11, 2020. Shueisha collected the 107 out of the 123 individual chapters into twelve individual tankōbon volumes, released from May 2, 2018, to July 3, 2020.

Viz Media published the first three chapters for its "Jump Start" initiative and then began to simultaneously publish the series in December 2018 after a restructuring of the English Shonen Jump. Shueisha also simultaneously published in English the series on the app and website Manga Plus starting in January 2019. In October 2019, Viz Media announced the print release of the manga; the first two volumes were released on July 7 and September 1, 2020, respectively.

==== Cancellation ====
On August 8, 2020, it was reported that Matsuki had been arrested for allegedly approaching and inappropriately touching two female middle school students in June 2020. Editors from Weekly Shōnen Jump stated that they would be taking the matter seriously, and later announced the series would immediately end publication with the chapter released on August 11. On August 17, 2020, Shueisha announced it had suspended all sales of the manga, and canceled the planned volume 13 and beyond. Viz Media and Manga Plus also decided to not publish the series' final chapter on their platforms. Viz Media removed its listing of further volumes.

Usazaki issued a statement on August 24, 2020, expressing sympathies for the victims and that they consider the cancellation to be appropriate, as they did not want the manga to be a work that triggers similar reactions from the victims. Despite regrets of having to end the manga mid-way, Usazaki urged fans of the series not to harass or blame the victims. On September 16, 2020, Matsuki was formally indicted for the second of the two indecent acts committed; Matsuki's sentencing was held on December 23 of that same year. The Tokyo District Court handed Matsuki a guilty verdict and a sentence of one year and six months in prison, suspended for three years (i.e., Matsuki would not serve his sentence if he remained on good behavior for three years).

Despite being fired from Shueisha, Matsuki was permitted to work for Shogakukan under the pseudonym Miki Yatsunami. He wrote Seishou no Shinrishi for Shogakukan's MangaONE service, a fact that only came to light when the company received widespread criticism for continuing to hire manga writer Shoichi Yamamoto despite similar offences.

==== Volumes ====
No.	Original release date	Original ISBN	English release date	English ISBN
1	May 2, 2018	978-4-08-881483-4	July 7, 2020	978-1-9747-0996-0
1. "Kei Yonagi" (夜凪景, Yonagi Kei); 2. "First Job" (初仕事, Hatsu-Shigoto); 3. "Stage 2" (ステージ2, Sutēji Tsū); 4. "Townperson A" (町人A, Chōnin Ē); 5. "An Unknown Me" (知らない私, Shiranai Watashi); 6. "Angel of Stars" ("スターズの天使", "Sutāzu no Tenshi"); 7. "Audition" (オーディション, Ōdishon)
2	July 4, 2018	978-4-08-881509-1	September 1, 2020	978-1-9747-0997-7
8. "Audition (Part 2)" (オーディション②, Ōdishon Tsū); 9. "Audition (Part 3)" (オーディション③, Ōdishon Surī); 10. "Meet and Greet" (顔合わせ, Kaoawase); 11. "Meet and Greet (Part 2)" (顔合わせ②, Kaoawase Ni); 12. "Roll Camera!" (クランクイン, Kurankuin); 13. "Yonagi Self-Monitors" (夜凪の俯瞰, Yonagi no Fukan); 14. "Transformation" (異変, Ihen); 15. "Chiyoko's Mask" (千世子の仮面, Chiyoko no Kamen); 16. "Friends" (友達, Tomodachi)
3	August 3, 2018	978-4-08-881583-1	November 3, 2020 (canceled)	978-1-9747-0998-4
17. "Their First Scene Together" (初共演, Hatsu-Kyōen); 18. "Pillow Fight" (枕投げ, Makuranage); 19. "Storm" (嵐, Arashi); 20. "Karen and Keiko" (カレンとケイコ, Karen to Keiko); 21. "In Profile" (横顔, Yokogao); 22. "Thank You" (ありがとう, Arigatō); 23. "Fireworks" (花火, Hanabi); 24. "Encounter" (遭遇, Sōgū); 25. "Araya Myoujin" (明神阿良也, Myōjin Araya)
4	November 2, 2018	978-4-08-881657-9	January 5, 2021 (canceled)	978-1-9747-1545-9
26. "Resolve" (覚悟, Kakugo); 27. "Assignment" (課題, Kadai); 28. "A New Member" (新メンバー, Shin-Menbā); 29. "Puppet Show" (人形劇, Ningyōgeki); 30. "Read-Through" (読み合わせ, Yomiawase); 31. "How Araya Makes a Role" (阿良也の役作り, Araya no Yakuzukuri); 32. "My Campanella" (私のカムパネルラ, Watashi no Kamupanerura); 33. "Nightscape" (夜景, Yakei); 34. "Acting Instructions" (演技指導, Engi-Shidō)
5	February 4, 2019	978-4-08-881694-4	March 2, 2021 (canceled)	978-1-9747-1557-2
35. "Secret" (秘密, Himitsu); 36. "Yuujirou Iwao" (巌裕次郎, Iwao Yūjirō); 37. "Chaos" (混乱, Konran); 38. "The Curtains Rise" (開演, Kaien); 39. "Crack" (綻び, Hokorobi); 40. "The Galactic Railroad" (銀河鉄道, Ginga Tetsudō); 41. "A New Star" (新星, Shinsei); 42. "Akira Hoshi" (星アキラ, Hoshi Akira); 43. "A Proper Play" (正しい芝居, Tadashī Shibai)
6	May 2, 2019	978-4-08-881795-8	—	—
44. "In My Words" (僕の言葉で, Boku no Kotoba de); 45. "Interlude" (幕間, Makuai); 46. "Flashback" (回想, Kaisō); 47. "Araya's Acting" (阿良也の芝居, Araya no Shibai); 48. "Goodbye" (別れ, Wakare); 49. "Araya and Iwao" (阿良也と巌, Araya to Iwao); 50. "Araya and Iwao (Part 2)" (阿良也と巌②, Araya to Iwao Ni); 51. "How to Stand" (立ち方, Tachikata); 52. "Curtain Call" (カーテンコール, Kāten Kōru)
7	July 4, 2019	978-4-08-881878-8	—	—
53. "Funeral" (告別式, Kokubetsu-shiki); 54. "Tragic Heroine" (悲劇のヒロイン, Higeki no Hiroin); 55. "Normal" (フツー, Futsū); 56. "The Girl at the Next Desk Over" (隣の席の君, Tonari no Seki no Kimi); 57. "The Observer" (見学者, Kengakusha); 58. "Celebrity" (芸能人, Geinōjin); 59. "You in April" (四月の君, Shigatsu no Kimi); 60. "Festival Day" (杉北祭当日, Sugikita-sai Tōjitsu); 61. "That Kind of Normal" (そういう普通, Sōyū Futsū)
8	September 4, 2019	978-4-08-882051-4	—	—
62. "Shinjuku" (新宿); 63. "Good Proposal" (良い話, Ī Hanashi); 64. "Declaration of War" (宣戦布告, Sensen Fukoku); 65. "Encounter" (邂逅, Kaikō); 66. "Arisa's Condition" (アリサの条件, Arisa no Jōken); 67. "Top Quality Meat" (極上の肉, Gokujō no Niku); 68. "Transformation" (変身, Henshin); 69. "Three Days" (3日間, Mikka-kan); 70. "The Outside" (外側, Sotogawa)
9	December 4, 2019	978-4-08-882103-0	—	—
71. "Day Two" (2日目, Futsuka-me); 72. "Effort (努力, Doryoku); 73. "Aura" (オーラ, Ōra); 74. "Supporting Role" (助演, Joen); 75. "Hanako's Picture" (花子の絵, Hanako no E); 76. "Chance of Victory" (勝機, Shōki); 77. "Swordplay" (殺陣, Tate); 78. "Yonagi's Father" (夜凪の怒り, Yonagi no Ikari); 79. "Press Conference" (記者会見, Kisha-Kaiken)
10	February 4, 2020	978-4-08-882205-1	—	—
80. "Fourteen Days Left" (残り14日, Nokori Jūyokka); 81. "Side A" (サイド甲, Saido kō); 82. "Confession" (告白, Kokuhaku); 83. "The Important Thing" (大切なのは, Taisetsuna no wa); 84. "Hero" (ヒーロー, Hīrō); 85. "The Opening Battle" (開戦, Kaisen); 86. "Desperation" (必死, Hisshi); 87. "Expiration Date" (消費期限, Shōhi-Kigen); 88. "How I'm Defined" (俺の定義, Ore no Teigi)
11	May 13, 2020 (Note: Volume 11 was delayed from May 1 to May 13 due to COVID-19 concerns.)	978-4-08-882284-6	—	—
89. "In the Ocean" (海の中, Umi no Naka); 90. "Mirror" (鏡, Kagami); 91. "For Yonagi" (夜凪のために, Yonagi no Tame ni); 92. "Reckless" (我武者羅, Gamushara); 93. "Strong Current" (大きな流れ, Ōkina Nagare); 94. "Flame" (炎, Honō); 95. "Identity" (アイデンティティ, Aidentiti); 96. "Limit" (限界, Genkai); 97. "Reach" (届け, Todoke); 98. "Wind" (風, Kaze)
12	July 3, 2020	978-4-08-882351-5	—	—
99. "Winner" (勝者, Shōsha); 100. "Road Show" (ロードショー, Rōdo Shō); 101. "GO" (GO, Gō); 102. "Goal" (狙い, Nerai); 103. "Weapon" (武器, Buki); 104. "Trigger" (起爆剤, Kibaku-zai); 105. "Side B" (サイド乙, Saido Otsu); 106. "Competition" (勝負, Shōbu); 107. "After-Party" (打ち上げ, Uchiage)

==== Uncollected chapters ====
These chapters were not published in a tankōbon volume. They were originally serialized in Japanese in issues of Weekly Shōnen Jump from April to August 2020.

108. "Star" (スター, Sutā)
109. "TV Commercial" (テレビ CM, Terebi Shīemu)
110. "Advertisement" (宣伝, Senden)
111. "The Real Thing" (本物, Honmono)
112. "Fame" (有名人, Yūmeijin)
113. "Ultimate Actor's Dream" (役者冥利, Yakusha-Myōri)
114. "Ultimate Actor's Dream (Part 2)" (役者冥利②, Yakusha-Myōri Ni)
115. "Guaranteed Pass" (必勝, Hisshō)
116. "More" (もっと, Motto)
117. "Steal" (奪う, Ubau)
118. "Den of Ogres" (鬼の巣, Oni no Su)
119. "Actresses" (女優たち, Joyū-tachi)
120. "Living Together" (共同生活, Kyōdō-Seikatsu)
121. "Another Step" (また一歩, Mata Ippo)
122. "Greeting" (挨拶, Aisatsu)
123. "Poison" (毒, Doku)

=== Canceled stage play ===
In June 2020, it was announced the manga would receive a stage play adaptation in 2022 titled Act-Age: Night on the Galactic Railroad (アクタージュ act-age～銀河鉄道の夜～). The play would be produced by Horipro, and directed and written by Shū Matsui. A "remote audition" for the role of the protagonist Kei Yonagi would have been held across Japan. On August 11, 2020, after Tatsuya Matsuki's arrest and the cancellation of the manga, Horipro announced the cancellation of the stage play.

== Reception ==
By February 2019, the first five volumes of the manga had 750,000 copies in circulation. By June 2020, the first eleven volumes of the manga had over 3 million copies in circulation. Volume 5 of the manga ranked thirteenth on Oricon's weekly manga rankings chart, with 52,319 copies sold.

The series ranked third on the "Nationwide Bookstore Employees' Recommended Comics of 2018". In April 2019, it was nominated for Best Shōnen Manga at the 43nd annual Kodansha Manga Awards. In December 2019, Brutus magazine listed Act-Age on its "Most Dangerous Manga" list, which included works with the most "stimulating" and thought-provoking themes. The series ranked sixth in a 2020 poll conducted by AnimeJapan of "Most Wanted Anime Adaptation".
