= Designclue =

Defunct Japanese company

designclue
- Founded: 2012
- Defunct: 2017
- Owner: PurpleCow Inc.
- Parent: PurpleCow Inc.

designclue was a global online crowdsourcing platform operated by PurpleCow Inc., launched in 2012 and discontinued in 2017. The platform enabled companies, organizations, and individuals to create custom design contests aimed at sourcing creative work from freelance designers.

Freelancers, primarily graphic designers, could register on the platform, create portfolios, and submit proposals to contests. Collaboration and payment were facilitated directly through the designclue website.

== Background ==
In December 2011, designclue won first prize in the Japanese incubation contest "Startup Challenge 5th," receiving funding of US$30,000. PurpleCow Inc., the company behind designclue, was established in June 2012 in Shibuya, Tokyo. In September 2012, the platform launched a closed beta version, positioning itself as a crowdsourcing service specializing in design.

In November 2012, the company relocated to Yanagibuild in Roppongi. In February 2013, designclue secured $147,000 in funding from Incubate Fund and East Ventures. The following month, it partnered with STORES.jp, an e-commerce platform, to offer free logo design services for online shops. In April 2013, the company formed a collaboration with Frekul, a free music distribution social network, to provide artist-focused design services. In June 2013, the company moved offices again within Roppongi.

By 2013, the platform had registered users from 65 countries, including Japan. The company discontinued operations in 2017.

Other sites that provide similar services are Freelancer, Talenthouse.

== Awards and recognition ==
designclue was awarded in one of the biggest Japanese Tech conference "IVS 2012".

== See also ==
- Freelance marketplace
- Crowdsourcing
- Kolabtree
