= 500 Global =

U.S. startup accelerator

- Formerly: 500 Global
- Type: Venture capital firm
- Founded: 2010; 16 years ago
- Founders: Dave McClure; Christine Tsai
- Headquarters: San Francisco, California
- Number of locations: Global
- Key people: Christine Tsai (CEO); Courtney Powell (COO)
- Website: 500.co

500 Global (previously 500 Startups) is an early-stage venture fund and seed accelerator founded in 2010 by Dave McClure and Christine Tsai. The fund admitted a first "class" of twelve startups to its incubator office in Mountain View, California in February 2011. They expanded to a second class of 21 in June 2011 and a third class of 34 in October 2011. 500 Global has $2.3 billion in assets under management (AUM) as of March 2024.

Notable companies 500 Global invested in include Eat App, IDreamBooks, Little Eye Labs, myGengo, Cypheme, Cucumbertown, Visual.ly, Canva, Convoz, Udemy, RidePal and Aircall.

In 2012, 500 Global acquired Mexican.VC, an accelerator in Mexico City, expects to substantially ramp up its investment in Mexico. Through its investment in Alta Ventures, 500 Global planned to have better access to deal flow in this region. 500 Global LATAM is directed by Santiago Zavala and has startups like Platzi in its portfolio.

As of February 2021, 500 Global had invested in over 2,400 companies including Eat App, IDreamBooks, Little Eye Labs, myGengo, Cypheme, Cucumbertown, Visual.ly, Canva, Convoz, Udemy, RidePal and Aircall. As of August 2015, more than 20% of the companies had participated in other incubators, 20–30% were based outside the United States, and over 60 had been acquired.

As of 2015, some of the firm's active companies were Credit Karma, Twilio, GrabTaxi, and Talkdesk. The exits include $403M acquisition of MakerBot by Stratasys, $350M acquisition of Wildfire by Google, $200M acquisition of Viki by Rakuten, and $117M acquisition of Simple by BBVA.

500 Global has investment partners and advisors from all over the world, e.g. Jassim Alseddiqi (United Arab Emirates), Enis Hulli (Turkey), Binh Tran (Vietnam), and Tilo Bonow (Germany). A famous partner, Monique Woodard from Black Founders, left the early-stage venture fund in 2018. 500 Global has locations in San Francisco, Mexico City, Miami, Dubai, Bahrain, Istanbul, Seoul, Kuala Lumpur, Singapore, Bangkok and Ho Chi Minh City. In 2015, they announced they would be starting a three-month growth program in London, UK as well as a pre-accelerator in Oslo, Norway. Full global programs have expanded to Japan, Taiwan, Singapore, Cambodia, Georgia, Israel, Saudi Arabia, and Canada.

In July 2017, co-founder Dave McClure resigned as general partner of all funds and entities managed by 500 Startups amid allegations of sexual harassment.

In March 2018, 500 Startups announced that it chose Downtown Miami as its first East Coast U.S. outpost.

In July 2019, Courtney Powell was named Chief Operating Officer of the firm.

In November 2020, 500 Startups formed a two-year partnership with Khmer Enterprise, a unit under the Cambodian Ministry of Economy and Finance. Through the Angkor 500 initiative, the firms will bring together founders throughout Cambodia to form teams and technology companies.

In September 2021, 500 Startups announced their rebranding to 500 Global and the closing of a $140M global flagship fund – the firm's largest fund to date–bringing assets under management to $1.8B. The firm has stated it is expanding its investment strategy beyond the accelerator and seed stage.

In October 2021, 500 Global had its first fully virtual accelerator class. In early 2023, the firm announced that it has launched an accelerator program in Tbilisi, Georgia as a part of its expansion in Eastern Europe.

== Venture education ==
500 Global runs a set of investor-education programs under the name VC Unlocked, which it began in 2015. The program's main edition, VC Unlocked: Silicon Valley, is a two-week course delivered on the Stanford University campus in partnership with the Stanford Engineering Center for Global & Online Education. The firm has also run editions in other locations, including a program in Tokyo delivered with the Tokyo Metropolitan Government and the Japan External Trade Organization (JETRO).
