= Criticism of Windows 10 =

Overview of criticism of the Microsoft Windows 10 operating system

Windows 10, a proprietary operating system released by Microsoft on July 29, 2015, has been criticized by reviewers and users. Due to issues mostly about privacy, it has been the subject of a number of negative assessments by various groups.

== General criticism ==
Critics have noted that Windows 10 heavily emphasizes freemium services and contains various advertising facilities. Some outlets have considered these to be a hidden "cost" of the free upgrade offer. Examples include media storefronts, Office 365, paid functionality in bundled games such as Microsoft Solitaire Collection, default settings that display promotions of "suggested" apps in Start menu and "tips" on the lock screen that may contain advertising, ads displayed in File Explorer for Office 365 subscriptions on Redstone 2 builds, and notifications promoting the Microsoft Edge web browser when a different browser is set as default.

=== Update system ===
Windows 10 Home is permanently set to download all updates automatically, including cumulative updates, security patches, and drivers, and users cannot individually select updates to install or not. Microsoft offers a diagnostic tool that can be used to hide updates and prevent them from being reinstalled, but only after they had been already installed, then uninstalled without rebooting the system. However, the software agreement states, specifically for users of Windows 10 in Canada, that they may pause updates by disconnecting their device from the Internet. Tom Warren of The Verge felt that, given web browsers such as Google Chrome had already adopted such an automatic update system, such a requirement would help to keep all Windows 10 devices secure, and felt that "if you're used to family members calling you for technical support because they've failed to upgrade to the latest Windows service pack or some malware disabled Windows Update then those days will hopefully be over."

Concerns were raised that due to these changes, users would be unable to skip the automatic installation of updates that are faulty or cause issues with certain system configurations‍—‌although build upgrades will also be subject to public beta testing via the Windows Insider Program. There were also concerns that the forced installation of driver updates through Windows Update, where they were previously designated as "optional", could cause conflicts with drivers that were installed independently of Windows Update. Such a situation occurred just prior to the general release of the operating system, when an Nvidia graphics card driver that was automatically pushed to Windows 10 users via Windows Update caused issues that prevented the use of certain functions, or prevented their system from booting at all.

Criticism was also directed towards Microsoft's decision to no longer provide specific details on the contents of cumulative updates for Windows 10. On February 9, 2016, Microsoft reversed this decision and began to provide release notes for cumulative updates on the Windows website.

Windows 10 has also received criticism due to deleting files without user permission after major updates. There can be multiple causes, such as a (now resolved) bug in the upgrade process, programs that are deemed to be incompatible with the new version of Windows and thus get uninstalled, a setting that didn't propagate properly when upgrading to Windows 10, or malware being detected in the files. Some users reported that during the installation of the November upgrade, some applications (particularly utility programs such as CPU-Z and Speccy) were automatically uninstalled during the upgrade process, and some default programs were reset to Microsoft-specified defaults (such as Photos app, and Microsoft Edge for PDF viewing), both without warning. Application .exe files would often get deleted automatically during updates.

Further issues were discovered upon the launch of the Anniversary Update ("Redstone"), including a bug that caused some devices to freeze (but addressed by cumulative update KB3176938, released on August 31, 2016), and that fundamental changes to how Windows handles webcams had caused many to stop working.

=== Distribution practices ===
A screenshot of the "Get Windows 10" free upgrade window on Windows 7

Microsoft was criticized for the tactics that it used to promote its free upgrade campaign for Windows 10, including adware-like behaviors, using deceptive user interfaces to coax users into installing the operating system, downloading installation files without user consent, and making it difficult for users to suppress the advertising and notifications if they did not wish to upgrade to 10. The upgrade offer was marketed and initiated using the "Get Windows 10" (GWX) application, which was first downloaded and installed via Windows Update in March 2015. Registry keys and Group Policy settings could be used to partially disable the GWX mechanism, but the installation of patches to the GWX software via Windows Update could reset these keys back to defaults, and thus reactivate the software. Third-party programs were also created to assist users in applying measures to disable GWX.

In September 2015, it was reported that Microsoft was triggering automatic downloads of the Windows 10 installation files on all compatible Windows 7 or 8.1 computers configured to automatically download and install updates, regardless of whether or not they had specifically requested the upgrade. Microsoft officially confirmed the change, claiming it was "an industry practice that reduces time for installation and ensures device readiness." This move was criticized by users who have data caps or devices with low storage capacity, as resources were consumed by the automatic downloads of up to 6 GB of data. Other critics argued that Microsoft should not have triggered any downloading of Windows 10 installation files without user consent.

In October 2015, Windows 10 began to appear as an "Optional" update in the Windows Update interface, but pre-selected for installation on some systems. A Microsoft spokesperson said that this was a mistake, and that the download would no longer be pre-selected by default. However, on October 29, 2015, Microsoft announced that it planned to classify Windows 10 as a "recommended" update in the Windows Update interface some time in 2016, which will cause an automatic download of installation files and a one-time prompt with a choice to install to appear. In December 2015, it was reported that a new advertising dialog had begun to appear, only containing "Upgrade now" and "Upgrade tonight" buttons, and no obvious method to decline installation besides the close button.

In March 2016, some users also alleged that their Windows 7 and 8.1 devices had automatically begun upgrading to 10 without their consent. In June 2016, the GWX dialog's behavior changed to make closing the window imply a consent to a scheduled upgrade. Despite this, an InfoWorld editor disputed the claims that upgrades had begun without any consent at all; testing showed that the upgrade to Windows 10 would only begin once the user accepts the end-user license agreement (EULA) presented by its installer, and that not doing so would eventually cause Windows Update to time out with an error, thus halting the installation attempt. It was concluded that these users may have unknowingly clicked the "Accept" prompt without full knowledge that this would begin the upgrade. In December 2016, Microsoft chief marketing officer Chris Capossela admitted that the company had "gone too far", by using this tactic, stating that "we know we want people to be running Windows 10 from a security perspective, but finding the right balance where you're not stepping over the line of being too aggressive is something we tried and for a lot of the year I think we got it right."

On January 21, 2016, Microsoft was sued in small claims court by a user whose computer, shortly after the release of the OS, had attempted to upgrade to Windows 10 without her consent. The upgrade failed, and her computer was left in an unstable state thereafter, which disrupted the ability to run her travel agency. The court ruled in favor of the user and awarded her $10,000 in damages, but Microsoft appealed. However, in May 2016, Microsoft dropped the appeal and chose to pay the damages. Shortly after the suit was reported on by the Seattle Times, Microsoft confirmed that it was updating the GWX software once again to add more explicit options for opting out of a free Windows 10 upgrade; the final notification was a full-screen pop-up window notifying users of the impending end of the free upgrade offer, and contained "Remind me later", "Do not notify me again" and "Notify me three more times" options.

=== Privacy and data collection ===
Concerns were shown by advocates and other critics for Windows 10's privacy policies and its collection and use of customer data. Under the default "Express" settings, Windows 10 is configured to send various information to Microsoft and other parties, including the collection of user contacts, calendar data, computer's appearance including color of the chassis and "associated input data" to personalize "speech, typing, and inking input", typing and inking data to improve recognition, allow apps to use a unique "advertising ID" for analytics and advertising personalization (functionality introduced by Windows 8.1) and allow apps to request the user's location data and send this data to Microsoft and "trusted partners" to improve location detection (Windows 8 had similar settings, except that location data collection did not include "trusted partners"). Users can opt out from most of this data collection, but telemetry data for error reporting and usage is also sent to Microsoft, and this cannot be disabled on non-Enterprise versions of Windows 10. The use of Cortana intelligent personal assistant also requires the collection of data "such as your device location, data from your calendar, the apps you use, data from your emails and text messages, who you call, your contacts and how often you interact with them on your device” to personalize its functionality.

Rock Paper Shotgun writer Alec Meer argued that Microsoft's intent for this data collection lacked transparency, stating that "there is no world in which 45 pages of policy documents and opt-out settings split across 13 different Settings screens and an external website constitutes 'real transparency'." ExtremeTech pointed out that, whilst previously campaigning against Google for similar data collection strategies, "[Microsoft] now hoovers up your data in ways that would make Google jealous." However, it was also pointed out that the requirement for such vast usage of customer data had become a norm, citing the increased reliance on cloud computing and other forms of external processing, as well as similar data collection requirements for services on mobile devices such as Google Now and Siri. In August 2015, Russian politician Nikolai Levichev called for Windows 10 to be banned from use by the Russian government, as it sends user data to servers in the United States (a federal law requiring all online services to store the data of Russian users on servers within the country, or be blocked, took effect September 2016).

Writing for ZDNet, Ed Bott said that the lack of complaints by businesses about privacy in Windows 10 indicated "how utterly normal those privacy terms are in 2015." In a Computerworld editorial, Preston Gralla said, "The kind of information Windows 10 gathers is no different from what other operating systems gather. But Microsoft is held to a different standard than other companies."

Microsoft Services Agreement reads that the company's online services may automatically "download software updates or configuration changes, including those that prevent you from accessing the Services, playing counterfeit games, or using unauthorized hardware peripheral devices." Critics interpreted this statement as implying that Microsoft would scan for and delete unlicensed software installed on devices running Windows 10. However, others pointed out that this agreement was specifically for Microsoft online services such as Microsoft account, Office 365, Skype, as well as Xbox Live, and that the offending passage most likely referred to digital rights management on Xbox consoles and first-party games, and not plans to police pirated video games installed on Windows 10 PCs. Despite this, some torrent trackers announced plans to block Windows 10 users, also arguing that the operating system could send information to anti-piracy groups that are affiliated with Microsoft. Writing about these allegations, Ed Bott of ZDNet compared Microsoft's privacy policy to Apple's and Google's and concluded that "after carefully reading the Microsoft Services Agreement, the Windows license agreement...and the Microsoft Privacy Statement carefully, I don't see anything that looks remotely like Big Brother." Columnist Kim Komando argued that "Microsoft might in the future run scans and disable software or hardware it sees as a security threat," consistent with the Windows 10 update policy.

Following the release of 10, allegations also surfaced that Microsoft had backported the operating system's increased data collection to Windows 7 and Windows 8 via "recommended" patches that added additional "telemetry" features. The updates' addition of a "Diagnostics Tracking Service" is connected specifically to Microsoft's existing Customer Experience Improvement Program (which is an opt-in program that sends additional diagnostic information to Microsoft for addressing issues), and the Application Experience service, which is typically intended for third-party software compatibility requests. This was achieved by including various DLLs and adding the telemetry service executable (all of which notably have versions pertaining to Windows 10 builds) as part of various updates from 2016 onward.

The data collection functionality is capable of transmitting personal information, browsing history, the contents of emails, chat, video calls, voice mail, photos, documents, personal files and keystrokes to Microsoft, for analysis, in accordance with the End User License Agreement. The terms of services agreement from Microsoft was updated to state the following:

We will access, disclose and preserve personal data, including your content (such as the content of your emails, other private communications or files in private folders), when we have a good faith belief that doing so is necessary to protect our customers or enforce the terms governing the use of the services.

In October 2017, the Dutch Data Protection Authority issued a complaint asserting that Windows 10's privacy policies did not comply with the laws of the Netherlands, as it claims that Microsoft does not provide sufficient information on what information is collected at the "Full" telemetry level and how it is processed. Microsoft disputed the claim that it did not provide enough disclosure of the "Full" telemetry level, and stated that it was working with the DDPA to "find appropriate solutions".

== Antitrust issues ==
In November 2016, Kaspersky Lab filed an antitrust complaint in Russia regarding the bundling of Windows Defender with the operating system, arguing that Microsoft was abusing its position to favor its own, in-house antivirus software over those of other vendors. In June 2017, Kaspersky filed another complaint with the European Commission, accusing the company of frustrating the use of third-party antivirus software on Windows 10 in defense of its "inferior" Windows Defender, including forcibly uninstalling third-party antivirus software during upgrades, and not providing enough time for antivirus developers to certify their software for each new upgrade to Windows 10. Microsoft stated that the company "[engages] deeply with antimalware vendors and have taken a number of steps to address their feedback", and that they had offered to meet Kaspersky executives to discuss any specific concerns.

On June 21, 2017, Microsoft issued a blog post confirming that since the "Creators Update", Windows 10 may prompt users to temporarily disable their antivirus software upon installation of a feature update if the current version is not deemed to be compatible, and that the operating system would direct users to relevant updates to their software following the conclusion of the update. Microsoft stated that it had worked with vendors to perform compatibility testing of their software with the update, and to "specify which versions of their software are compatible and where to direct customers after updating." Microsoft reported that as a result of these efforts, around 95% of Windows 10 users "had an antivirus application installed that was already compatible with Windows 10 Creators Update". Microsoft clarified that Windows Defender only operates if the device does not have any other security software installed, or if security software reports that a subscription had lapsed.

In Summer 2018, a Windows 10 Insider update received extreme backlash for a feature that discouraged the installation of other web browsers, such as Chrome or Firefox, telling users that they already have Microsoft Edge and therefore there is no need to change their browser. The feature was subsequently removed and was never released in an official update.

== See also ==
- Criticism of Windows XP
- Criticism of Windows Vista
- Criticism of Microsoft
- Criticism of Microsoft Windows
- Bundling of Microsoft Windows
