= Linux–Windows rivalry =

Competition between Linux and Windows operating systems

Operating system market share worldwide (December 2009)
| Windows | 94.41 |
| OS X | 4.73 |
| Linux | 0.69 |
| Playstation | 0.15 |
| Other | 0.03 |

Operating system market share worldwide (August 2026)
| Windows | 63.03 |
| macOS | 15.08 |
| OS X | 11.57 |
| Linux | 8.76 |
| Chrome OS | 1.56 |

The Linux–Windows rivalry is the competition and tensions between Linux and Microsoft Windows, particularly in the areas of desktop and server operating systems.

Although this has never been an officially declared rivalry, as neither side has formally declared hostile intentions toward the other, except for some accusations, strategies intended to delay or diminish the growth or influence of competing platforms have been alleged by whistleblowers, with many of the most prominent allegations involving Microsoft. Thus, while the conflict was not a formally declared one, various competitive tactics have been characterized as attempts to strengthen or establish a monopoly.

Relations between Microsoft and the Linux ecosystem have changed over the years, with no clear indication of a consistently improving or deteriorating relationship. However, a degree of rapprochement has been observed as Microsoft has increasingly contributed to open-source projects and technologies. Nevertheless, the changing relationship has influenced public perceptions of both closed-source and open-source software and has contributed to criticism of Microsoft.

== Background ==
In 1983, Microsoft announced Windows, a graphical operating environment for MS-DOS, designed to facilitate interaction between users and computers. Windows 1.0 was released two years later and received criticism for failing to meet users' expectations. Its popularity subsequently increased with the release of Windows 3.0 in 1990, while Microsoft's position in the personal computer market was further strengthened by Windows 95.

By the 1990s, Microsoft's allegedly anticompetitive practices had become increasingly apparent. One of the most well-known examples was the bundling of Windows with computers sold by original equipment manufacturers (OEMs), which often resulted in the operating system being preinstalled before the computers were purchased. This practice was negatively received by some Linux users, who preferred to install alternative operating systems. The practice of bundling Windows with OEM computers also affected competition in other areas of the software market. Microsoft's relationships with OEMs contributed to its dominance during the first browser war, as restrictions and incentives imposed through OEM agreements made it more difficult for competing products to gain distribution. These practices contributed to the United States v. Microsoft Corp. case, in which the U. S. government argued that Microsoft had unlawfully restricted competition by making it more difficult for users and OEMs to distribute or install competing software, including Netscape and Java.

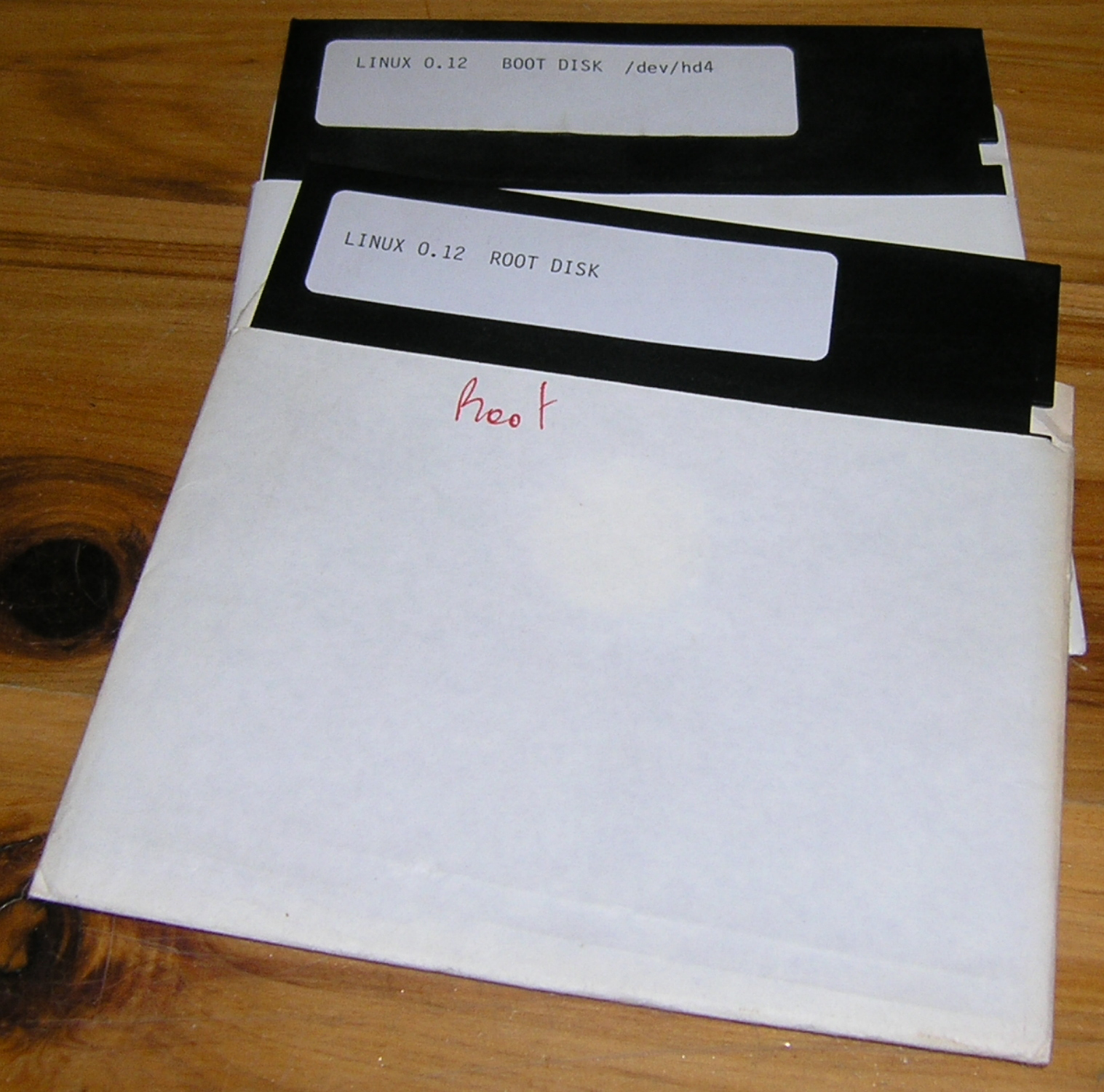
Floppy disks containing an early version of Linux.

In August 1991, the first version of the Linux kernel was announced on the comp.os.minix newsgroup. Linus Torvalds introduced the project with an announcement stating: "I'm doing a (free) operating system (just a hobby, won't be big and professional like gnu)". The initial version of the Linux kernel was released under a license that restricted commercial use. As development continued, Torvalds and other contributors moved toward a free-software license, and in early 1992 the kernel was relicensed under the GNU GPL.

One of the most successful areas of Linux adoption was the server market. In 1995, Linux accounted for less than 0.5% of the server operating system market, but by 2002, its share had risen to 23.1%. IDC predicted at the time that Linux would reach a 28% market share by 2008. Furthermore, in a survey of business users conducted by Forrester, 52% of respondents reported that they were replacing Windows servers with Linux.

Due to its open-source nature, Linux was already being adopted by, or receiving support from, commercial, research, and academic organizations by the mid-1990s. It also gained support from major technology companies such as Dell, IBM, and HP.

== Hostilities ==
=== Leaked memoranda ===
By the end of the 1990s, Microsoft had become increasingly concerned about the rapid growth of Linux and the implications this could have for other open-source projects. In its internal analysis, the company identified several characteristics that could contribute to Linux's future growth. Most notably, Microsoft's analysis suggested that Linux's open-source nature gave it greater credibility than other operating systems, while its customizability, performance, and reliability could offer advantages over Windows NT. It also noted that an advanced Win32-compatible graphical user interface could potentially make Linux a more productive platform for users of Windows applications. Microsoft consequently considered strategies for limiting Linux's growth, including locking customers into existing products and the possibility of pursuing patent lawsuits against Linux. All of this was revealed in the Halloween documents, particularly the second document, which focused specifically on Linux.

The leak was regarded as significant because it documented Microsoft's internal assessment of open-source software and proposed strategies for competing with Linux. The document also discussed the potential use of tactics intended to create uncertainty about open-source software.

=== 2000s ===
Hostilities continued in 2001, when Microsoft CEO Steve Ballmer described Linux as a "Cancer that attaches itself in an intellectual property sense to everything it touches". Ballmer's criticism was directed primarily at the GNU GPL, which he argued could require software incorporating GPL-licensed code to be released as open source. The remarks reinforced Microsoft's confrontational stance towards Linux at the time, although Ballmer later moderated his position as Microsoft's relationship with Linux changed.

In 2004, Microsoft launched the Get the Facts campaign, which sought to promote the advantages of Windows over Linux, particularly in the server market, including comparisons between Windows Server 2003 and Red Hat. The campaign was criticized for presenting inaccurate or misleading information and for relying on studies whose methodology and conclusions were disputed by Microsoft's opponents.

In May 2007, Microsoft claimed that free and open-source software infringed 235 of its patents, although the company did not publicly identify the patents at the time.

== Cooperation ==
Despite a decade of hostilities, by 2009 signs of collaboration between Microsoft and the Linux community had become apparent. Microsoft contributed more than 20,000 lines of code to the Linux kernel, initially consisting of Hyper-V drivers released under the GPLv2. The contribution was intended to improve the compatibility and performance of Linux as a guest operating system on Hyper-V.

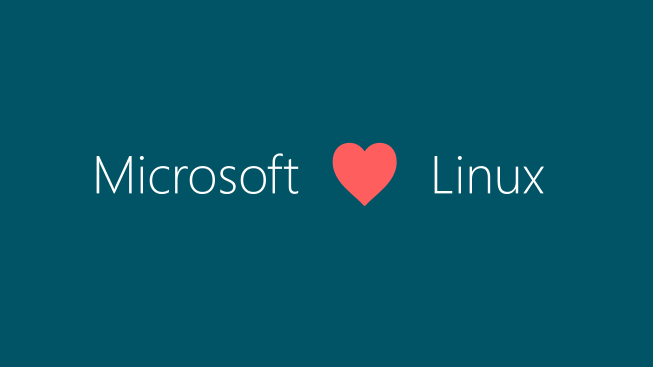
Microsoft Loves Linux poster published on an official Microsoft blog

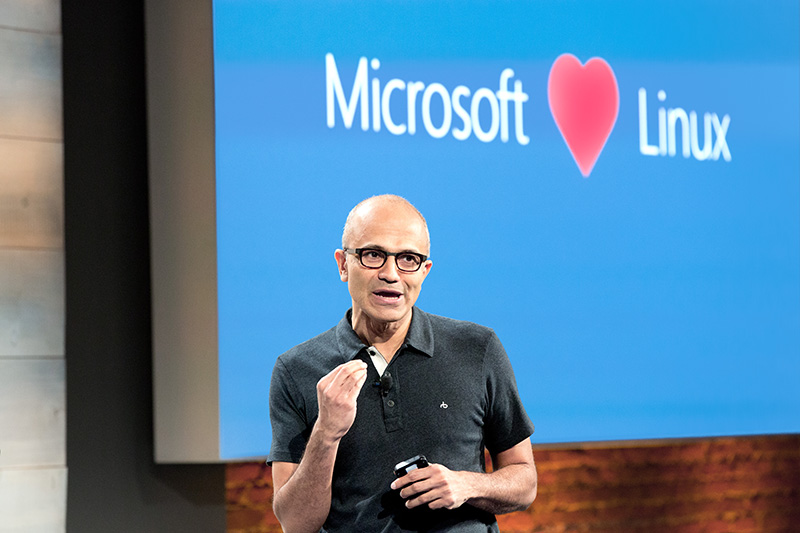
"Microsoft ❤️ Linux" in a presentation by Microsoft CEO Satya Nadella

After Satya Nadella became CEO in 2014, Microsoft took further steps toward collaboration with Linux and other open-source projects. The shift was particularly apparent in Azure, where Linux had become an increasingly important part of the platform. At a Microsoft event in October 2014, Nadella announced that approximately 20% of virtual machines running on Azure used Linux, while Microsoft expanded support for Linux distributions and announced partnerships with open-source technologies such as Hadoop. Microsoft subsequently continued expanding its cooperation with open-source projects and technologies, including Docker.

In 2016, Microsoft joined the Linux Foundation as a Platinum member. The move was described as a surprise at the time, given Microsoft's historically strained relationship with the Linux and open-source communities. The membership reflected Microsoft's growing involvement in open-source software. Prior to joining, Microsoft had already contributed to several Linux Foundation projects, including the Node.js Foundation, OpenDaylight, the Open Container Initiative, the R Consortium, and the Open API Initiative.

During this period, significant developments were made to WSL. Originally designed to implement Linux system calls within the Windows kernel, the project continued to grow to support multiple Linux distributions on Windows, which became available through the Microsoft Store. WSL 2 became increasingly popular and, according to the 2022 Stack Overflow Developer Survey, was used by 14.34% of professional developers.

During Build 2026, Microsoft announced the general availability of Coreutils for Windows, a set of Unix-like command-line utilities compiled to run natively on Windows. The move continues Microsoft's efforts to make Windows more compatible with tools and workflows commonly associated with Linux and other Unix-like systems, including through WSL. Some commentators have interpreted Microsoft's adoption of these utilities as evidence that Linux has "won" in the developer ecosystem, with the inclusion of Coreutils cited as a notable example.
