= Criticism of Linux =

Issues concerning use of operating systems which use Linux

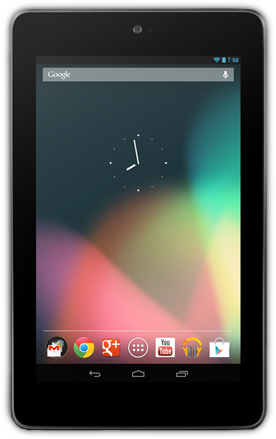
The first-generation Nexus 7 tablet running Android, an operating system using the Linux kernel. While Linux-based operating systems are in common use in tablet computers, they are less frequently adopted as desktop computers.

The criticism of Linux focuses on issues concerning use of operating systems which use the Linux kernel.

While the Linux-based Android operating system dominates the smartphone market in many countries and accounts for more than 72% of mobile device usage globally (as of 2024-2025), and while Linux is used on the New York Stock Exchange, on most supercomputers, is used to host 96.3 percent of the top 1 million web servers, and even is used on more virtual machines on Microsoft's own Azure cloud service than Microsoft Windows, it is used in few desktop and laptop computers. Much of the criticism of Linux is related to the lack of desktop and laptop adoption, although as of 2015 there has been some controversy with the project's perspective on security and the adoption of systemd by leading Linux distributions.

== Desktop use ==
Critics of Linux on the desktop have frequently argued that a lack of top-selling video games on the platform holds adoption back. For instance, as of September 2015, the Steam gaming service has 1,500 games available on Linux, compared to 2,323 games for Mac and 6,500 Windows games.

As of October 2021, Proton, a Steam-backed development effort descended from Wine provides compatibility with a large number of Windows-only games, and potentially better performance over Linux-native ports in some cases. ProtonDB is a community-maintained effort to gauge how well different versions of Proton work with a given game.

Linux remains a minority operating system among Steam users, but its presence is now visible enough to be part of the broader PC gaming conversation. In the April 2026 Steam Hardware & Software Survey, Steam listed Linux at 4.52% of surveyed users, compared with 93.47% for Windows and 2.01% for macOS.

=== Viability ===
Linus Torvalds has expressed that he intended the Linux kernel to be used in desktop operating systems. He argues that Android is widely used because it comes pre-installed on new phones, and that Linux distributions would need to be bundled on new computers to gain market share.

Linux has been criticized for a number of reasons, including lack of user-friendliness and having a steep learning curve, being inadequate for desktop use, lacking support for some hardware, having a relatively small games library, and lacking native versions of widely used applications.

Some critics do not believe Linux will ever gain a large share in the desktop market. In May 2009 Preston Gralla, contributing editor to Computerworld, believed that Linux would never be important to desktop/notebook users, even though he felt it was simple and straightforward to use, but that its low usage was indicative of its low importance in the desktop market.

In his essay Luxury of Ignorance: An Open-Source Horror Story, Eric S. Raymond stated that the lack of usability in many open-source and Linux tools is not from lack of manuals but from a lack of thought about the users' experience.

James Donald from Princeton University analyzed shared library concepts of several operating systems. In his 2003 paper titled Improved Portability of Shared Libraries, he worried about the lack of a Windows Application Compatibility Group equivalent.

==== Missed opportunities ====
Desktop Linux was criticized in late 2010 for having missed its opportunity to become a significant force in desktop computing. PC World executive editor Robert Stroh Meyer commented that although the Linux kernel and distributions based on it have exceptional security and stability, as well as great performance and usability, the time for desktop Linux based distributions to succeed has been missed. Nick Farrell, writing for TechEye, felt that the release of the poorly-received Windows Vista was a missed opportunity to grab significant market share.

Both critics indicated that Linux did not fail on the desktop due to being "too geeky," "too hard to use," or "too obscure". Both had praise for distributions, Stroh Meyer saying "the best-known distribution, Ubuntu, has received high marks for usability from every major player in the technology press". Both laid the blame for this failure on the open-source community. Stroh Meyer named the "fierce ideology of the open-source community at large" as being responsible, while Farrell stated "The biggest killer of putting penguin software on the desktop was the Linux community. If you think the Apple fanboys are completely barking, they are role models of sanity to the loudmouthed Open Sauce religious loonies who are out there. Like many fundamentalists they are totally inflexible — waving a GNU as if it were handed down by God to Richard Stallman".

The accusation of over-zealous advocacy has been dealt with previously; in 2006 Dominic Humphries stated that the aims of the Linux community are not desktop market-share or popularity, but in Linux being the best operating system that can be made for the community.

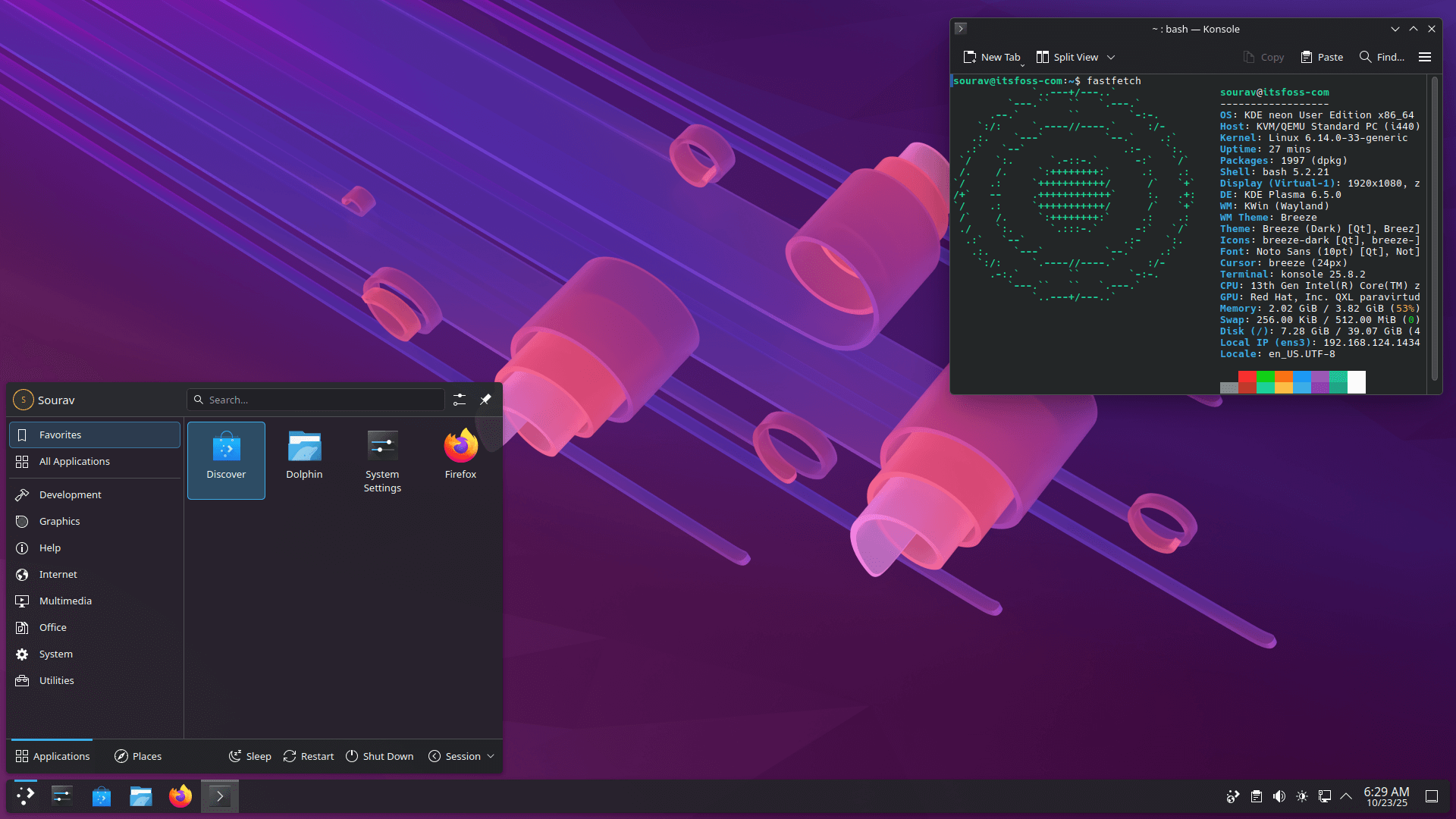
KDE Plasma 6.5 using dark theme running on KDE neon

Despite some members of the Linux community pushing beginner unfriendly software, and misconceptions based on old experiences with Linux based desktops, Linux desktop distributions nowadays are easy for anyone to install and use. Distributions with the KDE Plasma desktop environment, like Fedora KDE edition are particularly beginner friendly, as the Plasma desktop is designed to be a powerful and modern yet a easy and familiar Windows desktop drop-in (unlike the more popular GNOME desktop), and because the Fedora operating system focuses on ease of use and stability, likely due to corporate backing from Red Hat, a major Linux desktop / Linux desktop support company.

=== Third-party application development ===
Some Linux based desktop distributions are criticized for the difficulty of developing third-party applications for the platforms, with distribution fragmentation, insistence on using shared libraries instead of including the libraries with the application, and lack of concern given to keeping APIs consistent and backwards compatible being cited as factors. This particularly causes difficulties for closed-source applications, which are distributed exclusively as binaries, since the burden of ensuring compatibility with the myriad of Linux distributions and release versions is borne solely by the developer. Dirk Hohndel, VMware's Chief Open Source Officer, criticized the lack of standardization across distributions for creating an unfriendly environment for application development, writing that it "basically tells app developers 'go away, focus on platforms that care about applications.'" Miguel de Icaza, founder of the GNOME desktop environment, regards the disregard of backwards compatibility as a cultural issue with the Linux development community:

Backwards compatibility, and compatibility across Linux distributions is not a sexy problem. It is not even remotely an interesting problem to solve. Nobody wants to do that work, everyone wants to innovate, and be responsible for the next big feature in Linux. So Linux was left with idealists that wanted to design the best possible system without having to worry about boring details like support and backwards compatibility.

Tony Mobily, editor of Free Software Magazine, identified problems in the server roots of Linux in his article 2009: software installation in GNU/Linux is still broken – and a path to fixing it:

Every GNU/Linux distribution at the moment (including Ubuntu) confuses system software with end user software, whereas they are two very different beasts which should be treated very, very differently.

In August 2014 on the DebConf in Portland Linus Torvalds also voiced his unhappiness with the binary application packaging for the Linux distro ecosystem:

One of the things, none of the distributions have ever done right is application packaging [...] making binaries for linux desktop applications is a major fucking pain in the ass.

== Linux kernel criticisms ==
=== Kernel development politics ===
Some security professionals say that the rise in prominence of operating system-level virtualization using Linux has raised the profile of attacks against the kernel, and that Linus Torvalds is reticent to add mitigations against kernel-level attacks in official releases. Linux 4.12, released in 2017, enabled KASLR by default, but its effectiveness is debated.

Con Kolivas, a former kernel developer, tried to optimize the kernel scheduler for interactive desktop use. He finally dropped the support for his patches due to the lack of appreciation for his development. In the 2007 interview Why I quit: kernel developer Con Kolivas he stated:

If there is any one big problem with kernel development and Linux it is the complete disconnection of the development process from normal users. You know, the ones who constitute 99.9% of the Linux user base. The Linux kernel mailing list is the way to communicate with the kernel developers. To put it mildly, the Linux kernel mailing list (lkml) is about as scary a communication forum as they come. Most people are absolutely terrified of mailing the list lest they get flamed for their inexperience, an inappropriate bug report, being stupid or whatever. ... I think the kernel developers at large haven't got the faintest idea just how big the problems in userspace are.

=== Kernel performance ===
At LinuxCon 2009, Linux creator Linus Torvalds said that the Linux kernel has become "bloated and huge":

Citing an internal Intel study that tracked kernel releases, Bottomley said Linux performance had dropped about two percentage points at every release, for a cumulative drop of about 12 percent over the last ten releases. "Is this a problem?" he asked. -We're getting bloated and huge. Yes, it's a problem ... Uh, I'd love to say we have a plan ... I mean, sometimes it's a bit sad that we are definitely not the streamlined, small, hyper-efficient kernel that I envisioned 15 years ago ... The kernel is huge and bloated, and our icache footprint is scary. I mean, there is no question about that. And whenever we add a new feature, it only gets worse.

At LinuxCon 2014, Torvalds said he thinks the bloat situation is better because modern PCs are a lot faster:

Torvalds said he'd love for Linux to shrink in size "We've been bloating the kernel over the last 20 years, but hardware has grown faster".

=== Kernel code quality ===
In a November 2011 interview with the German newspaper Zeit Online, Linus Torvalds expressed concerns about the increasing complexity of the Linux kernel. He noted that the software had become "too complex" and that developers might struggle to navigate the codebase. Torvalds remarked that even individual subsystems had grown significantly in complexity, and he stated that he feared a future scenario where an error might occur that could no longer be properly understood or diagnosed.

Andrew Morton, one of Linux kernel lead developers, explains that many bugs identified in Linux are never fixed:

Q: Is it your opinion that the quality of the kernel is in decline? Most developers seem to be pretty sanguine about the overall quality problem. Assuming there's a difference of opinion here, where do you think it comes from? How can we resolve it?

A: I used to think [code quality] was in decline, and I think that I might think that it still is. I see so many regressions which we never fix.

Theo de Raadt, founder of OpenBSD, compares OpenBSD development process to Linux:

"Linux has never been about quality. There are so many parts of the system that are just these cheap little hacks, and it happens to run." As for Linus Torvalds, who created Linux and oversees development, De Raadt says, "I don't know what [Linus's] focus is at all anymore, but it isn't quality."

== Criticism by Microsoft ==
In 2004, Microsoft initiated its Get the Facts marketing campaign, which specifically criticized Linux server usage. In particular, it claimed that the vulnerabilities of Windows are fewer in number than those of Linux distributions, that Windows is more reliable and secure than Linux, that the total cost of ownership of Linux is higher (due to complexity, acquisition costs, and support costs), that use of Linux places a burden of liability on businesses, and that "Linux vendors provide little, if any indemnification coverage." In addition, Microsoft published various studies in an attempt to prove this, the factuality of which has been heavily disputed by different authors who claim that Microsoft's comparisons are flawed. Many Linux distributors now offer indemnification to customers, including Red Hat, SUSE, and Canonical, some of the largest providers.

Internal Microsoft reports from the Halloween documents leak have presented conflicting views. Particularly documents from 1998 and 1999 ceded that "Linux ... is trusted in mission critical applications, and – due to its open source code – has a long term credibility which exceeds many other competitive OSs", "An advanced Win32 GUI user would have a short learning cycle to become productive [under Linux]", "Long term, my simple experiments do indicate that Linux has a chance at the desktop market ...", and "Overall respondents felt the most compelling reason to support OSS was that it 'Offers a low total cost of ownership (TCO)'."

== Responses to criticism ==
The Linux community has had mixed responses to these and other criticisms. As mentioned above, while some criticism has led to new features and better user-friendliness, the Linux community as a whole has a reputation for being resistant to criticism. Writing for PC World, Keir Thomas, noted that, "Most of the time the world of Linux tends to be anti-critical. If anybody in the community dares be critical, they get stomped upon." In a 2015 interview, Linus Torvalds also mentioned the tendency of Linux desktop environment projects to blame their users instead of themselves in case of criticism.

== See also ==
- Criticism of Microsoft Windows
- The Unix-Haters Handbook
