= SwiftOnSecurity =

Computer security expert on Twitter

SwiftOnSecurity is a pseudonymous computer security expert and influencer on X, Mastodon, and Bluesky, inspired by Taylor Swift.

The account was originally created to post Taylor Swift-related memes about the Heartbleed bug. The name was chosen due to Swift's caution with regard to digital security, and the account's original focus on cybersecurity. The account has been cited in news articles about computer security. They are a Microsoft MVP, and work as an endpoint monitoring lead for a Fortune 500 company. Their blog contains general computer security advice, with a large amount dedicated to Windows and phishing.

As of November 2026, they have over 416,894 followers on X and 93,142 followers on the fediverse.

== Atlassian vulnerability ==
In December 2019, SwiftOnSecurity tweeted about an issue in Atlassian software that embedded the private key of a domain. This turned out to be a security vulnerability, and was assigned CVE-2019-15006.
