= Criticism of Windows Vista =

Critical reception of the Microsoft operating system

Windows Vista, an operating system released by Microsoft for consumers on January 30, 2007, has been widely criticized by reviewers and users. Due to issues with new security features, performance, driver support and product activation, it has been the subject of a number of negative assessments by various groups.

== Security ==
=== Driver signing requirement ===
For security reasons, 64-bit versions of Windows Vista allow only signed drivers to be installed in kernel mode. Because code executing in kernel mode enjoys wide privileges on the system, the signing requirement aims to ensure that only code with a known origin executes at this level. In order for a driver to be signed, a developer/software vendor has to obtain an Authenticode certificate with which to sign the driver. Authenticode certificates can be obtained from certificate authorities trusted by Microsoft. Microsoft trusts the certificate authority to verify the applicant's identity before issuing a certificate. If a driver is not signed using a valid certificate, or if the driver was signed using a certificate which has been revoked by Microsoft or the certificate authority, Windows will refuse to load the driver.

The following criticisms/claims have been made regarding this requirement:

- It disallows experimentation from the hobbyist community. The required Authenticode certificates for signing Vista drivers are expensive and out of reach for small developers, usually about $400–$500/year (from Verisign).

Microsoft allows developers to temporarily or locally disable the signing requirement on systems they control (by hitting F8 during boot) or by signing the drivers with self-issued certificates or by running a kernel debugger.

At one time, a third-party tool called Atsiv existed that would allow any driver, unsigned or signed to be loaded. Atsiv worked by installing a signed "surrogate" driver which could be directed to load any other driver, thus circumventing the driver signing requirement. Since this was in violation of the driver signing requirement, Microsoft closed this workaround with hotfix KB932596, by revoking the certificate with which the surrogate driver was signed.

=== Flaws in memory protection features ===
Security researchers Alexander Sotirov and Mark Dowd have developed a technique that bypasses many of the new memory-protection safeguards in Windows Vista, such as address space layout randomization (ASLR). The result of this is that any already existing buffer overflow bugs that, in Vista, were previously not exploitable due to such features, may now be exploitable. This is not in itself a vulnerability: as Sotirov notes, "What we presented is weaknesses in the protection mechanism. It still requires the system under attack to have a vulnerability. Without the presence of a vulnerability these techniques don't really [accomplish] anything." The vulnerability Sotirov and Dowd used in their paper as an example was the 2007 animated cursor bug, CVE-2007-0038.

One security researcher (Dino Dai Zovi) claimed that this means that it is "completely game over" for Vista security though Sotirov refuted this, saying that "The articles that describe Vista security as 'broken' or 'done for,' with 'unfixable vulnerabilities' are completely inaccurate. One of the suggestions I saw in many of the discussions was that people should just use Windows XP. In fact, in XP a lot of those protections we're bypassing [such as ASLR] don't even exist."

== Digital rights management ==
Another common criticism concerns the integration of a new form of digital rights management (DRM) into the operating system, specifically the Protected Video Path (PVP), which involves technologies such as High-bandwidth Digital Content Protection (HDCP) and the Image Constraint Token (ICT). These features were added to Vista due to licensing restrictions from the HD-DVD consortium and Blu-ray association. This would have concerned only the playback resolution of protected content on HD DVD and Blu-ray discs, but it had not been enabled as of 2017. A lack of a protected channel did not stop playback. Audio plays back as normal but high-definition video downsampled on Blu-ray and HD DVD to slightly-better-than-DVD quality video.

The Protected Video Path mandates that encryption must be used whenever content marked as "protected" will travel over a link where it might be intercepted. This is called a User-Accessible Bus (UAB). Additionally, all devices that come into contact with premium content (such as graphics cards) have to be certified by Microsoft. Before playback starts, all the devices involved are checked using a hardware functionality scan (HFS) to verify if they are genuine and have not been tampered with. Devices are required to lower the resolution (from 1920×1080 to 960×540) of video signals outputs that are not protected by HDCP. Additionally, Microsoft maintains a global revocation list for devices that have been compromised. This list is distributed to PCs over the Internet using normal update mechanisms. The only effect on a revoked driver's functionality is that high-level protected content will not play; all other functionality, including low-definition playback, is retained.

=== Notable critics ===
Peter Gutmann, a computer security expert from the University of Auckland, New Zealand, released a whitepaper in which he raises the following concerns against these mechanisms:

- Adding encryption facilities to devices makes them more expensive, a cost that is passed on to the user.
- If outputs are not deemed sufficiently protected by the media industry, then even very expensive equipment can be required to be switched off (for example, S/PDIF-based, high-end audio cards).
- Some newer high-definition monitors are not HDCP-enabled, even though the manufacturer may claim otherwise.
- The added complexity makes systems less reliable.
- Since non-protected media are not subject to the new restrictions, users may be encouraged to remove the protection in order to view them without restrictions, thus defeating the content protection scheme's initial purpose.
- Protection mechanisms, such as disabling or degrading outputs, may be triggered erroneously or maliciously, motivating denial-of-service attacks.
- Revoking the driver of a device that is in wide use is such a drastic measure that Gutmann doubts Microsoft will ever actually do so. On the other hand, they may be forced to because of their legal obligations to the movie studios.

The Free Software Foundation conducted a campaign against Vista, called "BadVista", on these grounds.

=== Reaction to criticism ===
Ed Bott, author of Windows Vista Inside Out, published a three-part blog which rebuts many of Gutmann's claims.

Bott's criticisms can be summarized as follows:

- Gutmann based his paper on outdated documentation from Microsoft and second-hand web sources.
- Gutmann quotes selectively from the Microsoft specifications.
- Gutmann did no experimental work with Vista to prove his theories. Rather, he makes mistaken assumptions and then speculates wildly on their implications.
- Gutmann's paper, while presented as serious research, is really just an opinion piece.

Technology writer George Ou stated that Gutmann's paper relies on unreliable sources and that Gutmann has never used Windows Vista to test his theories.

Gutmann responded to both Bott and Ou in a further article, which stated that the central thesis of Gutmann's article has not been refuted and the response of Bott is "disinformation".

Microsoft published a blog entry with "Twenty Questions (and Answers)" on Windows Vista Content Protection which refutes some of Gutmann's arguments.

Microsoft MVP Paul Smith has written a response to Gutmann's paper in which he counters some of his arguments. Specifically, he says:

- Microsoft is not to blame for these measures. The company offered this solution as an alternative to not being able to play back the content at all.
- The Protected Video Path will not be used for quite a while. There is said to be an agreement between Microsoft and Sony that Blu-ray discs will not mandate protection until at least 2010, possibly even 2012.
- Vista does not degrade or refuse to play any existing media, CDs or DVDs. The protected data paths are only activated if protected content requires it.
- Users of other operating systems such as Linux or Mac OS X will not have official access to this premium content.

Microsoft also noted that content protection mechanisms have existed in Windows as far back as Windows ME.

Since mainstream and extended support for Windows Vista ended on April 10, 2012, and April 11, 2017, respectively, plans to enable the Protected Video Path for Windows Vista are very unlikely.

== Hardware requirements and performance ==
Around the time of its release, Microsoft stated, "nearly all PCs on the market today will run Windows Vista," and most PCs sold after 2005 are capable of running Vista.

Some of the hardware that worked in Windows XP does not work, or works poorly in Vista, because no Vista-compatible drivers are available due to companies going out of business or their lack of interest in supporting old hardware.

=== Speed ===
Tom's Hardware published benchmarks in January 2007 that showed that Windows Vista executed typical applications more slowly than Windows XP with the same hardware configuration. A subset of the benchmarks used were provided by Standard Performance Evaluation Corporation (or SPEC), who later stated that such "results should not be compared to those generated while running Windows XP, even if testing is done with the same hardware configuration." SPEC acknowledges that an apple-to-apples comparison cannot be made in cases such as the one done by Tom's Hardware, calling such studies "invalid comparisons." However, the Tom's Hardware report conceded that the SPECviewperf tests "suffered heavily from the lack of support for the OpenGL graphics library under Windows Vista". For this reason the report recommended against replacing Windows XP with Vista until manufacturers made these drivers available.

The report also concluded in tests involving real world applications Vista performed considerably slower, noting "We are disappointed that CPU-intensive applications such as video transcoding with XviD (DVD to XviD MPEG4) or the MainConcept H.264 Encoder performed 18% to nearly 24% slower in our standard benchmark scenarios". Other commonly used applications, including Photoshop and WinRAR, also performed worse under Vista.

Many low-to-mid-end machines that come with Windows Vista pre-installed suffer from exceptionally slow performance with the default Vista settings that come pre-loaded, and laptop manufacturers have offered to "downgrade" laptops to Windows XP—for a price. However, this "price" is unnecessary, as Microsoft allows users of Windows Vista and Windows 7 to freely "downgrade" their software by installing XP and then phoning a Microsoft representative for a new product key.

=== File operation performance ===
When first released in November 2006, Vista performed file operations such as copying and deletion more slowly than other operating systems. Large copies required when migrating from one computer to another seemed difficult or impossible without workarounds such as using the command line. This inability to efficiently perform basic file operations attracted strong criticism. After six months, Microsoft confirmed the existence of these problems by releasing a special performance and reliability update, which was later disseminated through Windows Update, and is included in Service Pack 1.

Nonetheless, one benchmark reported to show that, while improving performance compared to Vista's original release, Service Pack 1 does not increase the level of performance to that of Windows XP. However, that benchmark has been questioned by others within ZDNet. Ed Bott both questions his colleagues' methods and provides benchmarks that refute the results.

=== Game performance ===
Early in Vista's lifecycle, many games showed a drop in frame rate compared to Windows XP. These results were largely the consequence of Vista's immature drivers for graphics cards, and higher system requirements for Vista itself. By the time Service Pack 1 was released in mid-2008, gaming benchmarks showed that Vista was on par with Windows XP. However, games such as Devil May Cry 4, Crysis and Left 4 Dead stated that their memory requirements on Vista were 1.5x–2x higher than XP.

=== Software bloat ===
Concerns were expressed that Windows Vista may contain software bloat. Speaking in 2007 at the University of Illinois, Microsoft distinguished engineer Eric Traut said, "A lot of people think of Windows as this large, bloated operating system, and that's maybe a fair characterization, I have to admit." He went on to say that, "at its core, the kernel, and the components that make up the very core of the operating system, is actually pretty streamlined."

Former PC World editor Ed Bott expressed skepticism about the claims of bloat, noting that almost every single operating system that Microsoft has ever sold had been criticized as "bloated" when they first came out; even those now regarded as the exact opposite, such as MS-DOS.

=== Vista capable lawsuit ===
Two consumers sued Microsoft in United States federal court alleging the "Windows Vista Capable" marketing campaign was a bait-and-switch tactic as some computers with Windows XP pre-installed could only run Vista Home Basic, sometimes not even running at a user-acceptable speed. In February 2008, a Seattle judge granted the suit class action status, permitting all purchasers in the class to participate in the case. Released documents in the case, as well as a Dell presentation in March 2007, discussed late changes to Windows Vista which permitted hardware to be certified that would require upgrading in order to use Vista, and that lack of compatible drivers forced hardware vendors to "limp out with issues" when Vista was launched. This was one of several Vista launch appraisals included in 158 pages of unsealed documents.

=== Laptop battery life ===
With the new features of Vista, criticism has surfaced concerning the use of battery power in laptops running Vista, which can drain the battery much more rapidly than Windows XP, reducing battery life. With the Windows Aero visual effects turned off, battery life is equal to or better than Windows XP systems. "With the release of a new operating system and its new features and higher requirements, higher power consumption is normal", as Richard Shim, an analyst with IDC noted, "when Windows XP came out, that was true, and when Windows 98 came out, that was true."

== Software compatibility ==
According to Gartner, "Vista has been dogged by fears, in some cases proven, that many existing applications have to be re-written to operate on the new system." Cisco has been reported as saying, "Vista will solve a lot of problems, but for every action, there's a reaction, and unforeseen side-effects and mutations. Networks can become more brittle." According to PC World, "software compatibility issues, bug worries keep businesses from moving to Microsoft's new OS." Citing "concerns over cost and compatibility," the United States Department of Transportation prohibited workers from upgrading to Vista. The University of Pittsburgh Medical Center said that the rollout of Vista is significantly behind schedule because "several key programs still aren't compatible, including patient scheduling software."

As of July 2007, there were over 2,000 tested applications that were compatible with Vista. Microsoft published a list of legacy applications that meet their "Works with Windows Vista" software standards as well as a list of applications that meet their more stringent "Certified for Windows Vista" standards. Microsoft released the Application Compatibility Toolkit 5.0 application for migrating Vista-incompatible applications, while virtualization solutions like VirtualBox, Virtual PC 2007 or those from VMware can also be used as a last resort to continue running Vista-incompatible applications under legacy versions of Windows.

Microsoft also provided an Upgrade Advisor Tool (.NET Framework must be installed and an Internet connection is required) which can be used on existing XP systems to flag driver and application compatibility issues before upgrading to Vista.

== Removal of announced features ==
Microsoft has also been criticized for removing some heavily discussed features such as Next-Generation Secure Computing Base in May 2004, WinFS in August 2004, Windows PowerShell in August 2005 (though this was released separately from Vista prior to Vista's release, and is included in Vista's successor, Windows 7), SecurID Support in May 2006, PC-to-PC Synchronization in June 2006. The initial "three pillars" in Vista were all radically altered to reach a release date.

== Pricing ==
Microsoft's international pricing of Vista has been criticized by many as too expensive. The differences in pricing from one country to another vary significantly, especially considering that copies of Vista can be ordered and shipped worldwide from the United States; this could save between $42 (€26) and $314 (€200). In many cases, the difference in price is significantly greater than was the case for Windows XP. In Malaysia, the pricing for Vista is at around RM799 ($244/€155). At the 2007 exchange rate, United Kingdom consumers paid almost double their United States counterparts for the same software.

Microsoft has come under fire from British consumers about the price it is charging for Vista, the latest version of Windows. British (and French) customers will pay double the US price. The upgrade from Windows XP to Vista Home Basic will cost £100 (€126), while American users will pay only £51 ($100, €64).

— Computer Active

Since the release of Windows Vista in January 2007 Microsoft has reduced the retail and upgrade price point of Vista. Originally Vista Ultimate full retail was priced at $399, and the upgrade at $259. These prices have since been reduced to $319 and $219 respectively.

== Software Protection Platform ==
Vista includes an enhanced set of anti-copying technologies, based on Windows XP's Windows Genuine Advantage, called Software Protection Platform (SPP). In the initial release of Windows Vista (without Service Pack 1), SPP included a reduced-functionality mode, which the system enters when it detects that the user has "failed product activation" or that the copy of Vista is "identified as counterfeit or non-genuine". A Microsoft white paper described the technology as follows:

The default Web browser will be started and the user will be presented with an option to purchase a new product key. There is no start menu, no desktop icons, and the desktop background is changed to black. [...] After one hour, the system will log the user out without warning.

Some analysts questioned this behavior, especially given an imperfect false-positive record on behalf of SPP's predecessor, and given at least one temporary validation server outage which reportedly flagged many legitimate copies of Vista and XP as "Non-Genuine" when Windows Update would "check in" and fail the "validation" challenge.

Microsoft altered SPP significantly in Windows Vista Service Pack 1. Instead of the reduced-functionality mode, installations of Vista left unactivated for 30 days present users with a nag screen which prompts them to activate the operating system when they log in, change the desktop to a solid black colour every hour, and periodically use notification balloons to warn users about software counterfeiting. In addition, updates classified as optional are not available to unactivated copies of Vista. Microsoft maintains a technical bulletin providing further details on product activation for Vista.

== Windows Ultimate Extras ==
Windows Vista Ultimate users could download exclusive Windows Ultimate Extras. These extras were released much more slowly than expected, with only four available as of August 2009, almost three years after Vista was released, which angered some users who paid extra mainly for the promised add-ons. Barry Goffe, Director of Windows Vista Ultimate for Microsoft states that they were unexpectedly delayed on releasing several of the extras, but that "Microsoft plans to ship a collection of additional Windows Ultimate Extras that it is confident will delight its passionate Windows Vista Ultimate customers."

== Vistaster ==
This term was coined as a disparaging substitute for the proper name of the Vista operating system. Use of the term was popularized by its use on The Secret Diary of Steve Jobs, a technology and pop culture comedic blog where author Daniel Lyons writes in the persona of then Apple CEO Steve Jobs. This use is in reference to the failure of Vista to meet sales and customer satisfaction expectations. Lyons published an article in Forbes using the term, and it was soon picked up by international media outlets: Jornal de Notícias, Rádio e Televisão de Portugal, La Nación, The Chosun Ilbo, and 163.com.

== Retrospective analysis ==
Keith Ward of Lifewire said that "Windows Vista was not Microsoft's most-loved release. People look at Windows 7 with nostalgia, but you don't hear much love for Vista. Microsoft has mostly forgotten it, but Vista was a good, solid operating system with many things going for it."

== See also ==
- Criticism of Windows 10
- Mojave Experiment
