= Ed Bott =

American technology journalist and author

Twit.tv Leo Laporte interviewing ZDNet's Ed Bott about CNET's Download.com.

Ed Bott is an American technology journalist and author, known for his books and articles on Microsoft Windows. He has been the editor for the U.S. version of PC/Computing and the managing editor for PC World in the past. In addition, Bott has written more than 40 books. The topics of his books include Microsoft Windows and Microsoft Office. As of 2026, Bott writes for ZDNet, where he has published continuously since 2006.

== Awards and honors ==
Bott is the awardee of eleven Microsoft Most Valuable Professional awards, and, according to Time magazine, had one of the best Twitter feeds of 2013. Bott is also a three-time winner of the Computer Press Association award, won an international award of merit from the Society for Technical Communication, and won two Jesse H. Neal Awards with Woody Leonhard.

== Publications ==
- Windows 11 Inside Out, Second Edition (November 17, 2026)
- Windows 11 Inside Out (March 11, 2023)
- Windows 10 Inside Out 4th Edition (December 22, 2020)
- Windows 10 Inside Out 3rd Edition (February 4, 2019)
- Windows 10 Inside Out 2nd Edition (November 6, 2016)
- Windows 10 IT Pro Essentials: Support Secrets (July 14, 2016)
- Windows 10 IT Pro Essentials: Top 10 Tools (April 26, 2016)
- Introducing Windows 10 for IT Professionals (February 18, 2016)
- Windows 10 Inside Out (October 22, 2015)
- Microsoft Office Inside Out: 2013 Edition (June 25, 2013)
- Introducing Windows 8.1 for IT Professionals (October 15, 2013)
- Windows 7 Inside Out, Deluxe Edition (July 25, 2011)
- Microsoft Office 2010 Inside Out (October 4, 2010)
- Windows 7 Inside Out (September 30, 2009)
- Windows Vista Inside Out, Deluxe Edition (June 8, 2008)
- Windows Vista Inside Out (January 18, 2007)
- Special Edition Using Microsoft Office 2007 (January 1, 2007)
- Microsoft Office 2007 In Depth by Ed Bott (July 24, 2008)
- Microsoft Windows XP Networking and Security Inside Out: Also Covers Windows 2000 (October 5, 2005)
- Microsoft Windows XP Inside Out Deluxe (November 4, 2004)
- Ed Bott's Your New PC: Seven Easy Steps to Help You Get Started! (October 27, 2004)
- Faster Smarter Microsoft Windows XP with Microsoft Plus! Digital Media Edition (November 19, 2003)
- Special Edition Using Microsoft Office 2003 (September 25, 2003)
- Microsoft Windows Security Inside Out for Windows XP and Windows 2000 (January 1, 2002)
- Using Microsoft Office XP Special Edition (May 22, 2001)
- Special Edition Using Microsoft Windows Millennium (November 13, 2000)
- Faster Smarter Microsoft Windows XP (December 13, 2002)
- Practical Microsoft Windows 2000 Professional Practical Series (January 31, 2000)
- Special Edition Using Windows 98 2nd Edition (December 21, 1999)
- Special Edition Using Microsoft Office 2000 (May 17, 1999)
- Using Microsoft Office 2000 Using Series (May 4, 1999)
- Special Edition Using Office 97 With Windows 98 (July 1, 1998)
- Platinum Edition Using Windows 98 (June 1998)
- Using Microsoft Windows 95 With Internet Explorer 4.0 Special Edition (February 1, 1998)
- Using Microsoft Office 97: Platinum Edition (June 7, 1997)
- Using Windows 95 Second Edition (March 1, 1997)
- Using Windows NT Workstation 4.0 (September 1, 1996)
- Using Microsoft Office for Windows 95 (October 1, 1995)
- Using Windows 95 (August 24, 1995)
- Using Microsoft Office 4 (January 1, 1995)
