= Mojave Experiment =

Advertising campaign by Microsoft

The Mojave Experiment was an advertising campaign conducted by Microsoft for Windows Vista in 2008. The campaign was part of Microsoft's efforts to change what it felt was an unfair negative consumer perception of the operating system. Mojave spanned a series of advertisements that consisted of individuals being shown a demonstration of Windows Vista by Microsoft; however, the operating system was rebranded in disguise as a new version of Windows codenamed "Mojave," which was not revealed during the demonstration.

Prior to the demonstration, participants generally gave a negative assessment of Windows Vista. In contrast, reviews for "Mojave" were positive, with participants stating that they intended to use or purchase the operating system for themselves; the same participants were astonished when they were told that "Mojave" was Windows Vista. The campaign implied that negative consumer perception was largely the result of preconceived notions about the operating system.

== Test procedure ==
The Mojave Experiment is a public case study designed by Microsoft to determine computer users' thoughts of Windows Vista, in the absence of prior experience. The study begins by asking the participant's thoughts of Windows Vista, with their answers based solely on their knowledge from word of mouth. They were then asked to rate Windows Vista, from 0 to 10. Next, the participants were introduced to Windows "Mojave." This was Windows Vista, rebranded to prevent preconceived bias. The users were guided by a Microsoft assistant to test "Mojave." After the test, the participants were then asked to rate "Mojave," from 0 to 10. It was then revealed to the participants that "Mojave" was simply Windows Vista, rebranded.

== Reception ==
Technology bloggers and journalists criticized the experiment, for several reasons, such as that the hardware and software were already set up, so the users did not have to install applications or device drivers, which were the typical source of compatibility issues.

== See also ==
- Windows Vista editions
- Windows Easy Transfer
- Windows Ultimate Extras
- Windows 7
