= Criticism of Microsoft =

Microsoft has been criticized for various aspects of its products and business practices. Issues with ease of use, robustness, and security of the company's software are common targets for critics. In the 2000s, a number of malware mishaps targeted security flaws in Windows and other products. Microsoft was also accused of locking vendors and consumers in to their products, and of not following or complying with existing standards in its software. Total cost of ownership comparisons between Linux and Microsoft Windows are a continuous point of debate.

The company has been the subject of numerous lawsuits, brought by several governments and by other companies, for unlawful monopolistic practices. It was the subject of the landmark 1998 United States v. Microsoft Corp. American antitrust law case, during which Microsoft CEO Bill Gates was called "evasive and unresponsive" and the company's officials were found on a number of occasions to have falsified evidence. In 2004, the European Union found Microsoft guilty in the Microsoft Corp. v. Commission case, and it received an 899 million euro fine.

== Ties to US Government departments ==
On September 14, 2019, Microsoft's flagship store was shut down by protestors as part of a direct action organized by Close the Camps NYC. The action was in response to Microsoft's $19.4 million contract with U.S. Immigration and Customs Enforcement (ICE). Microsoft's relationship with the immigration enforcement agency was revealed by executive Tom Keane, through a company blog post that described ICE's use of the company's high-security cloud storage product Azure Government. He went on to say the company is "proud to support" the work of ICE. As of January 2026, ICE had more than tripled the amount of data stored in Microsoft's Azure platform.

In February 2019, some of Microsoft's employees protested the company's war profiteering from a $480 million contract to develop augmented reality headsets for the United States Army.

== Copyright enforcement ==
When Microsoft discovered that its first product, Altair BASIC, was subject to widespread unauthorized copying, Microsoft founder Bill Gates wrote an Open Letter to Hobbyists that openly accused many hobbyists of stealing software. Gates' letter provoked many responses, with some hobbyists objecting to the broad accusation, and others supporting the principle of compensation. This disagreement over whether software should be proprietary continues into the present day under the banner of the free software movement, with Microsoft characterizing free software released under the terms of the GPL as being "potentially viral" and the GNU General Public License itself as a "viral license" which "infects" proprietary software and forces its developer to have to release proprietary source to the public.

The Halloween documents, internal Microsoft memos which were leaked to the open source community beginning in 1998, indicate that some Microsoft employees perceive "open source" software — in particular, Linux — as a growing long-term threat to Microsoft's position in the software industry. The Halloween documents acknowledged that parts of Linux are superior to the versions of Microsoft Windows available at the time, and outlined a strategy of "de-commoditize[ing] protocols & applications." Microsoft stated in its 2006 Annual Report that it was a defendant in at least 35 patent infringement lawsuits. The company's litigation expenses for April 2004 through March 2007 exceed $4.3 billion: over $4 billion in payouts, plus $300 million in legal fees.

Another concern of critics is that Microsoft may be using the distribution of shared source software to harvest names of developers who have been exposed to Microsoft code, as some believe that these developers could someday be the target of lawsuits if they were ever to participate in the development of competing products. This issue is addressed in published papers from several organizations including the American Bar Association and the Open Source Initiative.

Starting in the 1990s, Microsoft was accused of maintaining "hidden" or "secret" APIs: interfaces to its operating system software that it deliberately keeps undocumented to gain a competitive advantage in its application software products. Microsoft employees have consistently denied this; they claim that application developers inside and outside Microsoft routinely reverse-engineered DOS and 16-bit versions of Windows without any inside help, creating legacy support problems that far exceeded any alleged benefit to Microsoft. In response to court orders, Microsoft has published interfaces between components of its operating system software, including components like Internet Explorer, Active Directory, and Windows Media that sell as part of Windows but compete with application software.

On October 10, 2018, Microsoft joined the Open Invention Network community despite holding more than 60,000 patents.

== Mono patent concerns ==
On July 6, 2009, Microsoft announced that it was placing their ECMA 334 and ECMA 335 specifications under their Community Promise pledging that they would not assert their patents against anyone implementing, distributing, or using alternative implementations of .NET. Mono's implementation of those components of the .NET stack not submitted to the ECMA for standardization has been the source of patent violation concerns for much of the life of the project. In particular, discussion has taken place about whether Microsoft could destroy the Mono project through patent suits.

The base technologies submitted to the ECMA, and therefore also the Unix/GNOME-specific parts, are claimed to be safe due to Microsoft's explicitly placing both ECMA 334 (C#) and ECMA 335 (CLI) standards under the Microsoft Community Promise. The concerns primarily relate to technologies developed by Microsoft on top of the .NET Framework, such as ASP.NET, ADO.NET and Windows Forms (see non-standardized namespaces), i.e. parts composing Mono's Windows compatibility stack. These technologies are today not fully implemented in Mono and not required for developing Mono-applications, they are simply there for developers and users who need full compatibility with the Windows system.

In June 2009 the Ubuntu Technical Board stated that it saw "no reason to exclude Mono or applications based upon it from the archive, or from the default installation set."

The Free Software Foundation's Richard Stallman has stated on June 2, 2009, that "[...] we should discourage people from writing programs in C#. Therefore, we should not include C# implementations in the default installation of GNU/Linux distributions or in their principal ways of installing GNOME". On July 1, 2009, Brett Smith (also from the FSF) stated that "Microsoft's patents are much more dangerous: it's the only major software company that has declared itself the enemy of GNU/Linux and stated its intention to attack our community with patents.", "C# represents a unique threat to us" and "The Community Promise does nothing to change any of this".

Fedora Project Leader Paul Frields has stated, "We do have some serious concerns about Mono and we'll continue to look at it with our legal counsel to see what if any steps are needed on our part", yet "We haven't come to a legal conclusion that is pat enough for us to make the decision to take mono out".

In November 2011 at an Ubuntu Developer Summit, developers voted to have the Mono-based Banshee media player removed from Ubuntu's default installation beginning on Ubuntu 12.04; although reported reasonings included performance issues on ARM architecture, blocking issues on its GTK+ 3 version, and it being, in their opinion, "not well maintained", speculation also surfaced that the decision was also influenced by a desire to remove Mono from the base distribution, as the remaining programs dependent on Mono, gbrainy and Tomboy, were also to be removed. Mono developer Joseph Michael Shields defended the performance of Banshee on ARM, and also the claims that Banshee was not well-maintained as being a "directed personal insult" to one of its major contributors.

== Ignoring unauthorized copying ==
Microsoft ignored unauthorized copying of its own software for their benefit in the long term. While talking about users in China who do not pay for the software they use in 2006, to an audience at the University of Washington, Bill Gates said "And as long as they're going to steal it, we want them to steal ours. They'll get sort of addicted, and then we'll somehow figure out how to collect sometime in the next decade."

The practice allowed Microsoft to gain some dominance over the Chinese market and only then taking measures against unauthorized copies. In 2008, by means of the Windows update mechanism, a verification program called "Windows Genuine Advantage" (WGA) was downloaded and installed. When WGA detects that the copy of Windows is not genuine, it periodically turns the user's screen black. This behavior angered users and generated complaints in China with a lawyer stating that "Microsoft uses its monopoly to bundle its updates with the validation programs and forces its users to verify the genuineness of their software".

== Licensing agreements ==
A common complaint comes from those who want to purchase a computer that usually comes preinstalled with Windows without a copy of Windows pre-installed and without paying extra for the license either so that another operating system can be used or because a license was already acquired elsewhere, such as through the MSDN Academic Alliance program. Microsoft encourages original equipment manufacturers (OEMs) to supply computers with Windows pre-installed by presenting their dominance in computer sales and arguing that consumers benefit by not having to install an operating system. Because the price of the license varies depending on discounts given to the OEM and because there is no similar computer that the OEM offers without Windows, there is no immediate way to find the size of the refund. In 2009, Microsoft stated that it has always charged OEMs about $50 for a Windows license on a $1,000 computer.

While it is possible to obtain a computer with no or free operating systems, virtually all large computer vendors continue to bundle Microsoft Windows with the majority of the personal computers in their ranges. The claimed increase in the price of a computer resulting from the inclusion of a Windows license has been called the "Windows tax" or "Microsoft tax" by opposing computer users. The Findings of Fact in the United States Microsoft antitrust case of 1998 established that "One of the ways Microsoft combats piracy is by advising OEMs that they will be charged a higher price for Windows unless they drastically limit the number of PCs that they sell without an operating system pre-installed. In 1998, all major OEMs agreed to this restriction." Microsoft also once assessed license fees based on the number of computers an OEM sold, regardless of whether a Windows license was included; Microsoft was forced to end this practice due to a consent decree. In 2010, Microsoft stated that its agreements with OEMs to distribute Windows are nonexclusive, and OEMs are free to distribute computers with a different operating system or without any operating system.

Microsoft does not provide refunds for Windows licenses sold through an OEM, including licenses that come with the purchase of a computer or are pre-installed on a computer.

According to Microsoft's End-user license agreement for Windows 7 the ability to receive a refund for the operating system is determined by the hardware manufacturer:

By using the software, you accept these terms. If you do not accept them, do not use the software. Instead, contact the manufacturer or installer to determine its return policy. You must comply with that policy, which might limit your rights or require you to return the entire system on which the software is installed.

— Microsoft Software License Terms: Windows 7 Professional

Acer Inc. has a policy of requiring the customer to return items at their own expense, and the balance received by the customer can be as low as €30. In other cases, vendors have asked that customers requesting refunds sign non-disclosure agreements. Older versions of Microsoft Windows had different license terms with respect to the availability of a refund for Windows:

By using the software, you accept these terms. If you do not accept them, do not use the software. Instead, contact the manufacturer or installer to determine their return policy for a refund or credit.

— Microsoft software license terms for Windows Vista Home Basic, Home Premium and Ultimate versions

Based on the updated language, vendors refused to issue partial refunds for Windows licenses, requiring that the computer be returned altogether. In some countries, this practice has been ruled a violation of consumer protection law.

Additionally, the EULA for Windows Vista was criticized for being too restrictive.

== Litigation ==
Microsoft's market dominance and business practices have attracted widespread resentment, which is not necessarily restricted to the company's competitors. In a 2003 publication, Dan Geer argued the prevalence of Microsoft products has resulted in a monoculture which is dangerously easy for viruses to exploit.

On June 25, 2024, the European Commission accused Microsoft of violating the Treaty on the Functioning of the European Union by bundling Microsoft Teams with Microsoft 365 and Microsoft Office.

== Labor practices ==
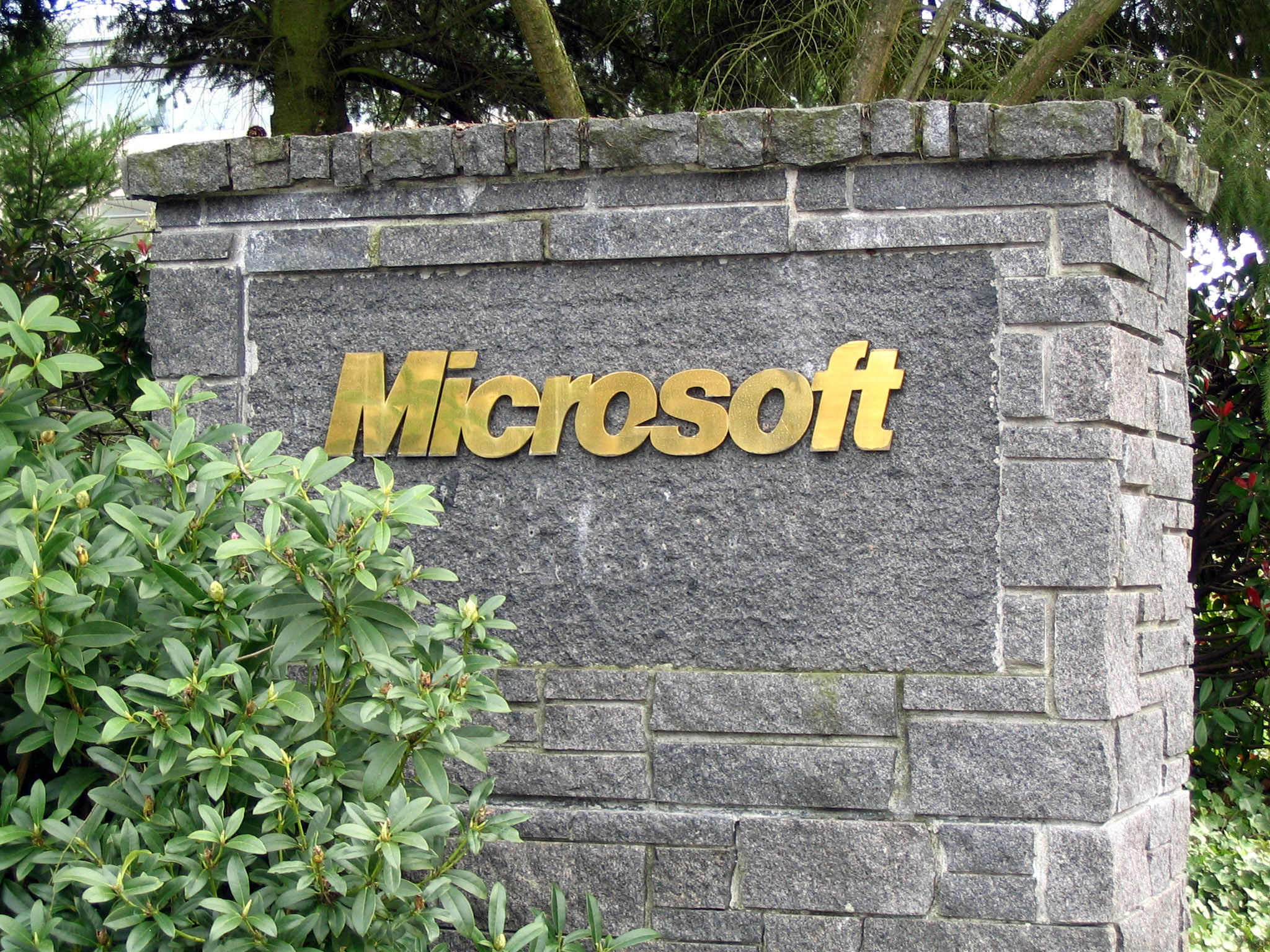
The entrance to Microsoft Redmond campus in Redmond, Washington

Microsoft has been criticized for the use of permatemp employees (employees who are employed for years as "temporary" and hence do not have medical benefits), use of forced retention tactics, where departing employees would be sued to prevent departure, as well as more traditional cost-saving measures, ranging from cutting medical benefits to not providing towels in company locker rooms.

Historically, Microsoft has also been accused of overworking employees, in many cases, leading to burnout within just a few years of joining the company. The company is often referred to as a "Velvet Sweatshop", a term which originated in a 1989 Seattle Times article, and later became used to describe the company by some of Microsoft's own employees. This characterization is derived from the perception that Microsoft provides nearly everything for its employees in a convenient place, but in turn overworks them to a point where it would be bad for their (possibly long-term) health. For example, the kitchenettes have free beverages and many buildings include exercise rooms and showers. However, the company has been accused of attempting to keep employees at the company for exceptionally long hours. This is detailed in several books about Microsoft, including Hard Drive: Bill Gates and the Making of the Microsoft Empire.

A US state lawsuit was brought against Microsoft in 1992 representing 8,558 current and former employees that had been classified as "temporary" and "freelance", and became known as Vizcaino v. Microsoft. In 1993, the suit became a US Federal Class Action in the United States District Court Western District Of Washington at Seattle as No. C93-178C. The Final Settlement came in 2005. The case was decided on the (IRS-defined) basis that such "permatemps" had their jobs defined by Microsoft, worked alongside regular employees doing the same work, and worked for long terms. After a series of court setbacks including three reversals on appeal, Microsoft settled the suit for US$97 million.

A side effect of the "permatemp" lawsuit is that now contract employees are prevented from participating in team morale events and other activities that could be construed as making them "employees". They are also limited to 18-month contracts and must leave after that time for 6 months before returning under contract.

Microsoft is the largest American corporate user of H-1B guest worker visas and has joined other large technology companies like Google in recently lobbying for looser H-1B visa restrictions.

The late Jesse Jackson had believed Microsoft should hire more minorities and women. Jackson had urged other companies to diversify their workforce. He believed that Microsoft made some progress when it appointed two women to its board of directors in 2015.

== Advertising and public relations ==
Critics have alleged that Microsoft has used funding to drum up support from think tanks and trade organizations such as the Alexis de Tocqueville Institution (AdTI), the Independent Institute, and Americans for Technology Leadership (ATL). During the antitrust case United States v. Microsoft, ATL sent a poll to 19 state attorneys general purporting to show that "the public believes state AGs should devote their energy to causes other than Microsoft". Also during the case the Independent Institute ran full-page advertisements in The New York Times and The Washington Post defending Microsoft, which was later revealed to have funded the ad campaign. The institute published Winners, Losers, and Microsoft: Competition and Antitrust in High Technology shortly thereafter.

In June 2002, the AdTI published a report, quickly pulled under the argument that it was a draft version, which contained criticism of the copyleft model and the GNU General Public License. A May 2002 press release for the report stated that it would contain arguments suggesting that governments could be threatened by hackers and terrorists (who could study potential vulnerabilities due to source availability) if it used open source software. However, the draft contained no references to these topics. Open Source Initiative (OSI) founder Bruce Perens felt that the report had "Microsoft's paws all over [it]". Microsoft argued that its funding was for AdTI's operations as a whole, and not relevant to any specific research by the organization.

"Champagne", a 2002 British television advert for the Xbox, received 136 complaints from viewers to the Independent Television Commission (ITC) over its content. The advert featured a newborn baby being launched out of its mother—aging as it flies through the air, and crashing into a gravestone. It contained the tagline "Life is short, play more." The advert was banned from television by the ITC, who considered it to be "offensive, shocking and in bad taste", noting complaints citing the advert's themes of death and the "traumatic experience" the person was facing in the ad.

In August 2004, the Advertising Standards Authority (ASA) ordered Microsoft to pull ads in Britain that claimed that the total cost of ownership of Linux servers was ten times that of Windows Server 2003. The comparison included the cost of hardware, and put Linux at a disadvantage by installing it on more expensive but poorer-performing hardware compared to that used for Windows.

On January 22, 2007, Rick Jelliffe made a claim on his blog that a Microsoft employee offered to pay him to make corrections in English Wikipedia articles concerning Office Open XML. Microsoft spokesperson Catherine Brooker expressed the belief that the article had been "heavily written" by IBM employees who supported the rival OpenDocument format, though she provided no specific evidence. Internet entrepreneur and Wikimedia Foundation founder Jimmy Wales described Microsoft's offer as unethical.

In 2009, it was found that a photo on the Polish version of Microsoft's business productivity website—which depicted three people of various races during an office meeting—had been edited to replace the head of an African-American man with that of a Caucasian, whilst also failing to edit the person's hand to match the different skin color. Microsoft apologized and quickly removed the image.

In 2011, Moneylife.in alleged that two "anonymous comments boosting their product"—one by a Nokia employee and another by a Microsoft employee—were posted on their review of Nokia Lumia 800, which was based only on the "technical specifications" and the reviewer "hadn't laid a finger on the phone". In conclusion, Charles Arthur argued "Nobody has come out of the episode looking good. Sapkale was accused of breaking his own site's privacy policy by posting the IP and email addresses of the commenters, while the commenting duo's failure to declare any interest looked, at best, like astroturfing."

In 2014 details on a partnership between Machinima.com and Microsoft came to light regarding a marketing campaign for Xbox One. Machinima would offer some of its users $3 per thousand views if the user showed 30 seconds of an Xbox One game and mentioned the system by name. Controversy arose when it was reported that, under the terms of the promotion, participants were not allowed to disclose that they were being paid for said endorsements, which Ars Technica said conflicted with FTC regulations requiring recipients to fully disclose when such actions occur. Machinima stated that the confidentiality clause only applied to the terms of the agreement, and not to the existence of the agreement, and Microsoft ended the promotion and directed Machinima to add disclosures to the videos involved. In September 2015, Machinima settled with the FTC over charges that the ad campaign failed to comply with FTC endorsement guidelines; the FTC decided not to take action against Microsoft since it already has "policies and procedures designed to prevent such lapses".

Since the 2010s, Microsoft has faced criticism for using adware-like tactics to market recent software and services. Microsoft faced criticism over its marketing and distribution of no-cost Windows 10 upgrades for Windows 7 and 8 users, which included a "Get Windows 10" application automatically downloaded via Windows Update that displayed popups advertising the offer, use of dark patterns to coax users into installing the operating system, downloading installation files without user consent, and making it difficult for users to suppress the advertising and notifications if they did not wish to upgrade to Windows 10. Microsoft has used advertising embedded in the Microsoft Bing search engine and Microsoft Edge web browser to discourage the use of competing web browser Google Chrome, including displaying prominent ads on specific search terms, and programming Edge to inject on-screen notifications and banner advertising (with messages such as "Microsoft Edge runs on the same technology as Chrome") when browsing Chrome's website. In 2023 and 2024, Microsoft began using notifications to encourage Chrome users to switch to Microsoft Bing and Microsoft Copilot.

== Tax avoidance ==
As reported by several news outlets, an Irish subsidiary of Microsoft based in the Republic of Ireland declared £220 bn in profits but paid no corporation tax for the year 2020. This is due to the company being tax resident in Bermuda as mentioned in the accounts for 'Microsoft Round Island One', a subsidiary that collects licence fees from the use of Microsoft software worldwide. Dame Margaret Hodge, a Labour MP in the UK said, "It is unsurprising – yet still shocking – that massively wealthy global corporations openly, unashamedly and blatantly refuse to pay tax on the profits they make in the countries where they undertake business".

In 2020, ProPublica reported that the company had diverted more than $39 billion in U.S. profits to Puerto Rico using a mechanism structured to make it seem as if the company was unprofitable on paper. As a result, the company paid a tax rate on those profits of "nearly 0%." When the Internal Revenue Service audited these transactions, ProPublica reported that Microsoft aggressively fought back, including successfully lobbying Congress to change the law to make it harder for the agency to conduct audits of large corporations.

== Blacklisting of journalists ==
John C. Dvorak said that in the 1980s, Microsoft classified journalists as "Okay", "Sketchy", or "Needs work" and targeted "Needs work" journalists in an attempt to have them terminated. Dvorak said that he was denied information about Windows because he was on a blacklist. Mary Jo Foley stated that she was denied interviews with Microsoft personnel for several years following the publication of a story based on a memo describing the number of bugs in Windows 2000 at release.

== Censorship in China ==
Microsoft (along with Google, Yahoo, Cisco, AOL, Skype, and other companies) has cooperated with the Chinese government in implementing a system of Internet censorship. Human rights advocates such as Human Rights Watch and media groups such as Reporters Without Borders criticized the companies, noting for example that it is "ironic that companies whose existence depends on freedom of information and expression have taken on the role of censor." Since 2009, Microsoft has run a local version of Bing in China that censors thousands of websites and phrases such as "human rights" and "Communist Party corruption".

=== Bing censorship of the 1989 Tiananmen Square massacre ===
On June 4, 2021, the 32nd anniversary of the 1989 Tiananmen Square massacre, searches for the Tank Man image and videos were censored by Microsoft Bing search engine worldwide. Hours after Microsoft acknowledged the issue, the search returned only pictures of tanks elsewhere in the world. Search engines that license results from Microsoft such as DuckDuckGo and Yahoo faced similar issues. Microsoft said the issue was "due to an accidental human error." According to a Bloomberg Businessweek investigation, the full explanation was that Microsoft accidentally applied its Chinese blacklist to the rest of the world.

The director of Human Rights Watch, Kenneth Roth, said he found the idea it was an inadvertent error "hard to believe". David Greene, Civil Liberties Director at Electronic Frontier Foundation, said that content moderation was impossible to do perfectly and "egregious mistakes are made all the time", but he further elaborated that "At worst, this was purposeful suppression at the request of a powerful state."

== Privacy issues ==
=== Collaboration with the NSA on internet surveillance ===
Microsoft was the first company to participate in the PRISM surveillance program, according to leaked NSA documents obtained by The Guardian and The Washington Post in June 2013, and acknowledged by government officials following the leak. The program authorizes the government to secretly access data of non-US citizens hosted by American companies without a warrant. Microsoft has denied participation in such a program.

In July 2013, The Guardian elaborated that leaked documents show that:

- Microsoft helped the NSA to circumvent its encryption to intercept web chats on Outlook.com and gave it unencrypted access to Outlook.com and Hotmail email.
- Microsoft provided the NSA with access to users' data on its cloud storage service OneDrive (formerly SkyDrive).
- After Microsoft bought Skype, the NSA tripled the number of Skype video calls being collected through PRISM.

In a statement, Microsoft said that they "provide customer data only in response to legal processes."

=== Use of engineers in China for U.S. military technical support ===
In July 2025, ProPublica reported that Microsoft had used engineers in the People's Republic of China to help maintain United States Department of Defense (DOD) systems. U.S. personnel, often with limited-to-no technical skills, formally oversee engineers in China who have far more advanced technical expertise, presenting a vulnerability to hacking. Microsoft did not disclose the location of the engineers to the Pentagon. Microsoft stated that it terminated the program, termed "digital escort", following publicity of it. The engineers in China maintained SharePoint, which was affected by a zero-day vulnerability that led to breaches of hundreds of organizations by Chinese state-sponsored advanced persistent threat groups Linen Typhoon, Violet Typhoon and Storm-2603.

=== Telemetry and data collection ===
Windows 10 was criticized on-launch for having default settings that send various information regarding user behaviors to Microsoft and its "trusted partners", such as data regarding user contacts and calendar events, location data and history, "telemetry" (diagnostics data); this could not be fully disabled on non-enterprise versions of Windows 10), an "advertising ID", as well as further data when the Cortana assistant is enabled in full.

Microsoft faced criticism from France's data protection commission and the European Union for its practices in regards to Windows 10. On subsequent iterations of the OS, Microsoft has clarified its data collection policies, and made its out-of-box experience provide clearer information on Windows privacy settings, and the effects they have on the overall user experience. Microsoft also simplified its "telemetry" options to only consist of "Basic" and "Full" modes, and reduced the amount of system information collected in "Basic" mode.

In November 2018, the Dutch government issued a report stating that telemetry implementations in Office 365 violated the EU General Data Protection Regulation (GDPR). In July 2019 the company tasked with investigating the privacy risks reported that Microsoft had adequately addressed these issues in Office 365 ProPlus, while the other concerns still remained.

Microsoft would later double-down by mandating the creation or ownership of a Microsoft account on a brand new computer running Windows 11 which in of itself raises privacy concerns as opening a Microsoft account requires agreeing to an EULA.

== Robot journalism ==
In May 2020, Microsoft announced that a number of its MSN contract journalists would be replaced by robot journalism leading to criticism about which stories would be displayed and their quality.

== Xbox Live controversies ==
=== Xbox Live prohibition on use of the word "gay" ===
Microsoft has come under some criticism for its attitude to homosexuality and Xbox Live. Users may not use the string "gay" in a gamertag (even in a non-homosexual context, for example as part of a surname), or refer to homosexuality in their profile (including self-identifying as such), as the company considers this "content of a sexual nature" or "offensive" to other users and therefore unsuitable for the service. After banning 'Teresa', a lesbian gamer who had been harassed by other users for being a homosexual, a senior Xbox Live team member, Stephen Toulouse, has clarified the policy, stating that "Expression of any sexual orientation [...] is not allowed in gamertags" but that they are "examining how we can provide it in a way that won't get misused".

=== 2021 Xbox Live subscription price increase ===
On January 22, 2021, Microsoft announced that the pricing model for Xbox Live subscriptions would be increasing across each price tier, with a year of the service doubling from US$60 to US$120 for users. The move was met with widespread criticism from users and news media, with speculation that the change was meant to make the Xbox Game Pass subscription more enticing. In response to the backlash, on the same day that the price increase was announced, Microsoft reversed the decision to increase the price of Xbox Live.

== ANS patent controversy ==
Asymmetric numeral systems is a widely used family of methods in data compression, whose author released it into public domain, wanting to be unrestricted by the patent system, and had stopped Google from patenting it. In June 2019 Microsoft lodged a patent application called 'Features of range asymmetric number system encoding and decoding'. The USPTO issued a final rejection of the application on October 27, 2020. Yet on March 2, 2021, Microsoft gave a USPTO explanatory filing stating "The Applicant respectfully disagrees with the rejections", seeking to overturn the final rejection under the "After Final Consideration Pilot 2.0" program. The application is currently still pending, as USPTO has not confirmed if it will allow the rejection appeal to proceed. Microsoft won the patent in 2022.

== Forced Uyghur labor in Xinjiang ==
In 2020, the Australian Strategic Policy Institute accused at least 82 major brands of being connected to forced Uyghur labor in Xinjiang. Microsoft is reported as being supplied by three Chinese factories employing Uyghur and Xinjiang workers. In 2024, a Microsoft incubator was reported to have provided support to two Chinese companies that sell software used for censorship in China.

== Israeli military support ==
The Israeli military has utilized Microsoft's Azure cloud computing platform and AI services during the Gaza war to identify targets. Since 2022, it has also used Microsoft's servers to store millions of hours of intercepted Palestinians' phone calls. The Israeli Ministry of Defense is Microsoft's second largest military customer. This relationship has led to protests within the company. In response, Microsoft employees founded the "No Azure for Apartheid" campaign to advocate for the company to cut ties with Israel. The group is a part of the larger No Tech for Apartheid movement.

In October 2024, Microsoft fired two employees who organized an unauthorized vigil at its Redmond headquarters to honor Palestinians killed in the Gaza war. The employees, part of the group "No Azure for Apartheid", sought to address the company's involvement in the Israeli government's use of its technology.

During a February 2025 meeting, five employees were kicked out for wearing shirts that spelled out "Does Our Code Kill Kids, Satya?". On 20 March 2025, before an event at Seattle's Great Hall with Brad Smith and Steve Ballmer, protestors projected "Microsoft powers genocide" on the wall. Subsequently, two employees interrupted AI executive Mustafa Suleyman at a speaking event on 4 April 2025 in protest at the company's support of Israel. In May 2025, an employee interrupted Satya Nadella's keynote speech.

In April 2025, the Boycott, Divestment and Sanctions movement added Microsoft to its list of targets for partnering "with the apartheid regime of Israel and its prison system".

In June 2025, due to a Trump executive order, Microsoft suspended the email account of an International Criminal Court prosecutor who was investigating Israel for war crimes. According to Microsoft, this decision was made in consultation with the ICC, and the company has since enacted policy changes to prevent similar situations in the future, and when four additional ICC judges were sanctioned shortly after, their email accounts were not suspended.

In August 2025, 5 Microsoft workers were fired in connection to protests at Microsoft HQ in Redmond. Microsoft workers set up encampments, establishing a Liberated Zone on the Martyred Palestinian Children's Plaza, formerly known as the Microsoft East Campus Plaza on August 19 and 20. On August 20, 20 protestors were violently arrested. On August 26, 7 tech workers, including 6 current and former Microsoft workers sat-in Microsoft President Brad Smith's office and were arrested.

In 2026, Microsoft made leadership changes in its Israeli subsidiary following internal reviews into the company’s cooperation with Israeli security agencies and reported use of Azure cloud infrastructure during the Gaza war. Alon Haimovich, head of Microsoft Israel, stepped down alongside several other managers, and oversight of the subsidiary was temporarily transferred to Microsoft France. The reviews followed media reports alleging that Azure had been used to store and process large volumes of Palestinian communications data from Gaza and the West Bank.

== Push for artificial intelligence features ==
=== Microsoft Copilot ===
Microsoft Copilot is a chatbot developed by Microsoft and was released on February 7, 2023. It started as a large language model that could be used on web browsers. In 2024, Microsoft started integrating the model in Windows 10 and Windows 11, and also developed and launched with the partnership of several computer brands a special type of computers known as Copilot+ PCs. These computers feature a dedicated Copilot key on the keyboard that allows to launch the Copilot application when pressed. They also feature an integrated NPU, along with other integrated AI features. Microsoft has progressively integrated more Copilot features onto the system and other software to mixed reception from consumers. On one hand, some users view Copilot as a good complement for increasing the efficiency of doing tasks, projects and searching for information. On the other, the difficulty to remove the integrated AI features from the operating system and Microsoft software, the perceived lack of quality of the model, the privacy and environment concerns and the seemingly prioritization for the AI push combined with the lack of response to user feedback has caused several Windows users to criticize Microsoft's integration method of the chatbot. In November 2025, Pavan Davuluri, Microsoft's Windows + Devices chief, posted on X announcing Windows is evolving into an "agentic OS". The public replied with mostly negative comments critizicing the decision, and hours later the ability to comment on the post was limited.

In January 2026, Microsoft CEO Satya Nadella requested that people stop calling artificial intelligence "slop" and instead accept AI as the "new equilibrium" of human nature. The public reaction instead made people double down on the backlash, causing a Streisand effect, and the term "Microslop", a portmanteau of the words "Microsoft" and "slop", became popular on social media. In March 2026, after several reports from the Microsoft Copilot Discord server found that the word "Microslop" was blacklisted, users flooded the server with workarounds like "M1CR0$L0P", eventually causing Microsoft to pause invites and temporarily lock down the server. The term "Microslop" is used to describe discontent with Microsoft's practices, especially with the push of artificial intelligence features such as Copilot.

=== Windows Recall ===
In 2024, Microsoft released Windows Recall, an AI-powered feature in Windows 11 which was intended to help users remember anything they do on their PC by taking screenshots every few seconds, allowing users to use natural language search to search through the screenshots. Recall was overwhelmingly panned by critics, with many experts calling it a disaster for security and privacy considering it was enabled by default. The backlash prompted Microsoft to postpone its initial layout, changing it to an opt-in feature and providing removal instructions.

== See also ==
Criticism of other software companies:

- Criticism of Facebook
- Criticism of Apple Inc.
- Criticism of Google
- Criticism of Yahoo
- Criticism of Amazon
- Criticism of Spotify
- Criticism of Netflix
- Criticism of Dropbox

General mechanisms at work:

- Path dependence
- Embrace, extend, and extinguish
- Network effect
- Vendor lock-in
- Appeal to fear
- Fear, uncertainty, and doubt
