= Scroogled =

2012–14 Microsoft advertising campaign

Scroogled (a portmanteau of "screwed" and "Google") was a series of Microsoft attack ads that ran between November 2012 and November 2013. Created by Mark Penn, the campaign sought primarily to attack a competing company, Google, by pointing out disadvantages and criticism of their products and services in comparison to those run by Microsoft (particularly Bing and Outlook.com). The original campaign focused on Google Shopping's change to a pay-per-click model, with later campaigns focusing upon Google's use of user data for targeted advertising, and the capabilities of the ChromeOS platform in comparison to Windows.

== History ==
Although Microsoft had attacked Google in its advertising before, the Scroogled campaign began in November 2012, attacking the Google Shopping service for its shift to a pay-per-click (PPC) model in which retailers are required to pay Google to have products listed, and are ranked in search results by their payments and relevance. The site suggested that users use Microsoft's competing Bing Shopping service instead, which had previously vowed not to shift to a PPC model.

The next campaign in February 2013 incorporated elements of advocacy, attacking Gmail for using the contents of messages to generate targeted advertising, and recommending Outlook.com instead. The site also featured a survey of 1,000 users against the service's advertising practices, and a petition calling upon Google to stop engaging in the practice.

In April 2013, Microsoft attacked Android, citing a recent allegation that Google Play Store had been, without disclosure, leaking basic personal information about users (including names, email addresses, and phone numbers) to application developers.

In August 2013, alongside the launch of its Bing for Schools initiative, Microsoft argued that Google's use of advertising on search results pages in an educational environment could "distract [students] from their studies", unlike the ad-free version of Bing that can be enabled through the Bing for Schools program.

In November 2013, Microsoft began to offer Scroogled merchandise through Microsoft Store, such as shirts and mugs featuring designs attacking Google's privacy practices. That same month, Microsoft also released a Scroogled ad starring Rick Harrison in parody of his television series Pawn Stars, which saw Harrison rejecting a Chromebook at his pawn shop due to its reliance on web-based software, as opposed to a "traditional" computer with Windows and Microsoft Office.

== Legacy ==
After terminating the Scroogled campaign, Microsoft redirected its website "scroogled.com" to "whymicrosoft.com", a website that argues that Microsoft's products are better than those of other companies.

Eight years later, on 12 March 2021, a Google blog post entitled "Our ongoing commitment to supporting journalism" mentioned Scroogled in passing. Penned by Kent Walker, the post briefly talks in support of journalism before beginning to attack and shame Microsoft in a variety of ways, without offering much context. This post comes in the wake of Google's clash with news outlets in 2021. In January that year, Australia proposed the News Media Bargaining Code law. Google opposed it, threatening to pull its search engine from Australia, while Microsoft supported it. In the aftermath, the 12 March 2021 hearing session of the U.S. House Judiciary Committee focused on the way Google distributes news.
