= Halloween documents =

Confidential Microsoft strategies against free and open-source software

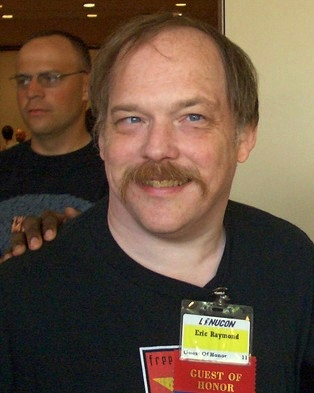
Eric Raymond

The Halloween documents comprise a series of confidential Microsoft memoranda on potential strategies relating to free software, open-source software, and to Linux in particular, and a series of media responses to these memoranda. Both the leaked documents and the responses were published by open-source software advocate Eric S. Raymond in 1998.

The documents are associated with Halloween because many of them were originally leaked close to October 31 in different years.

== Overview ==
The first Halloween document, requested by senior vice-president Jim Allchin for the attention of senior vice-president Paul Maritz and written by Microsoft program manager Vinod Valloppillil, was leaked to Eric Raymond in October 1998, who immediately published an annotated version on his web site. The document contained references to a second memorandum specifically dealing with Linux, and that document, authored by Vinod Valloppillil and Josh Cohen at Microsoft, was also obtained, annotated and published by Raymond. Microsoft later acknowledged the documents' authenticity. Marked "Microsoft confidential", the documents identified open-source software, and in particular the Linux operating system, as a major threat to Microsoft's domination of the software industry, and suggested tactics Microsoft could use to disrupt the progress of open-source software.

These documents acknowledged that free software products such as Linux were technologically competitive with some of Microsoft's products, and set out a strategy to combat them. These views contradicted Microsoft's public pronouncements on the subject.

Since the publication of the two original documents, other Microsoft memoranda on related topics have also been leaked and published.

== List of documents ==
The documents are from a variety of sources. Only some are leaked internal memos (documents I, II, VII, VIII, and X). One is a public statement (document III). The others are responses by Eric Raymond to various columns, news articles, and other works.

No.	Name	Author	Date	Brief description
I	"Open Source Software: A (New?) Development Methodology"	Microsoft / Vinod Valloppillil	August 1998	A leaked internal report
II	"Linux OS Competitive Analysis: The Next Java VM?"	Microsoft / Vinod Valloppillil	August 1998	A leaked internal report
III	Untitled statement	Microsoft / Aurelia van den Berg	November 1998	Press statement from Microsoft Netherlands
IV	"When Software Things Were Rotten"	Eric S. Raymond	December 1998	A satire piece based on Microsoft's Ed Muth comparing open source developers to Robin Hood
V	"The FUD Begins"	Eric S. Raymond	March 1999	A response by Raymond to Ed Muth's allegations that Linux has a "weak value proposition"
VI	"The Fatal Anniversary"	Eric S. Raymond	October 1999	A response by Raymond to studies authored by the Gartner group for Microsoft
VII	"Research E-Bulletin: Attitudes Towards Shared Source and Open Source Research Study"	Microsoft	September 2002	A summary of the results of a Microsoft survey describing reactions to Microsoft's Shared Source Initiative
VIII	"OSS and Government"	Microsoft / Orlando Ayala	November 2002	Describes Microsoft's procedures for responding to notable conversions away from Microsoft software
IX	"It Ain't Necessarily SCO"	Eric S. Raymond and Rob Landley	August 2003	A response to the allegations made by the SCO Group in its initial filings in SCO v. IBM
X	"Follow The Money"	Mike Anderer	March 2004	An e-mail from consultant Mike Anderer to SCO's Chris Sontag revealing Microsoft's channeling of $86 million (equivalent to $150 million in 2025) to SCO
XI	"Get The FUD"	Eric S. Raymond	June 2004	A response to Microsoft's "Get the Facts" campaign

=== Documents I and II ===
These are leaked reports for Microsoft's own use, both written by Vinod Valloppillil, a program manager at Microsoft.

Document I provides a detailed introduction to the concepts behind open source software and its possible impact on Microsoft products and services. It outlines the strengths and weaknesses of open source software. Document II describes the basic architecture of the Linux system, and its relation to Unix and Windows NT.

Document I revealed that "FUD" (spreading fear, uncertainty, and doubt) was a traditional Microsoft marketing strategy, acknowledged and understood internally. Examples of Microsoft's FUD tactics are announcing nonexistent products or spreading rumors that competing products will crash Windows. Raymond suggests that the documents show that while Microsoft may have been dismissive of open source software in public, it privately considers it a serious competitor.

In discussing ways of competing with open source, Document I suggests that one reason that open source projects had been able to enter the server market is the market's use of standardized protocols. The document then suggests that this can be stopped by "extending these protocols and developing new protocols" and "de-commoditiz[ing] protocols & applications". This policy has been internally nicknamed "embrace, extend, extinguish". Document I also suggests that open source software "is long-term credible ... FUD tactics can not be used to combat it", and "Recent case studies (the Internet) provide very dramatic evidence ... that commercial quality can be achieved / exceeded by OSS projects."

Documents I and II were filed as evidence on January 16, 2007, in the case of Comes v. Microsoft.

=== Document III ===
The statement from Aurelia van den Berg, the Press and Public Relations manager of Microsoft Netherlands, puts forward Microsoft's view on the first two documents. It says that the documents are not an "official position", but that "it is routine and appropriate" to research competitors. This statement is only a brief response, but many points were later incorporated into an official response from Microsoft.

=== Document VII ===
This document is a summary of the results of a survey of developers and IT managers, carried out by Microsoft, describing reactions to Microsoft's shared-source program. Eric Raymond provides commentary suggesting ways that the open-source community can promote itself based on the results of the survey. The results show favorable responses about both open-source and shared-source principles. It also describes low total cost of ownership (TCO) as a major reason for Linux adoption, in contradiction to many documents released by the company suggesting that Windows has a lower TCO than Linux solutions.

=== Document VIII ===
"OSS and Government", aka "Halloween VIII: Doing the Damage-Control Dance", is a memo from Group Vice President of Worldwide Sales, Orlando Ayala, to general managers of Microsoft regional subsidiaries. It describes the availability of support from Microsoft corporate for regional sales personnel facing competition from Linux in government markets.

=== Document X ===
An e-mail from consultant Mike Anderer to SCO Group's Chris Sontag, also known as "Halloween X: Follow The Money". The document describes, among other points, Microsoft's channeling of $86 million (equivalent to $147 million in 2025) to SCO.

== See also ==
- AARD code
- Microsoft and open source
- Santa Cruz Operation
- Embrace, extend, and extinguish
