= Microsoft Most Valuable Professional =

Award by Microsoft

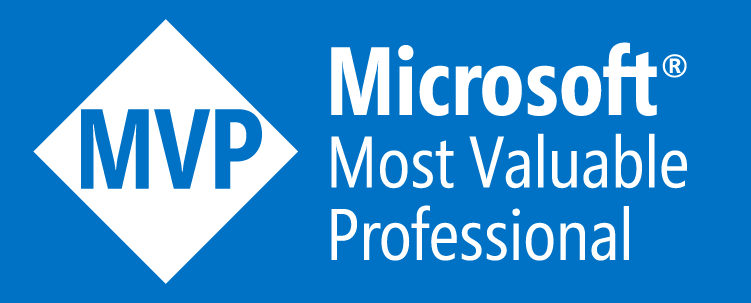

The Microsoft Most Valuable Professional (MVP) award is given by Microsoft to "technology experts who passionately share their knowledge with the community". They are awarded to people who "actively share their ... technical expertise with the different technology communities related directly, or indirectly to Microsoft". The MVP recognition lasts for a year and is awarded for a person's Microsoft related activity, contributions and influence over the previous year.

The MVP program grew out of the software developer community. Some of the earliest MVPs were those most active in online peer support communities, such as Usenet and CompuServe. It has since grown to include other types of products, and other avenues of contribution. Steve Ballmer spoke to a group of Microsoft MVPs about Windows XP and Windows Vista.

A posting from Tamar Granor on the Universal Thread web site gives this account of the origin of the MVP program.

Way back in the dark ages, Microsoft provided a great deal of technical support on CompuServe. The CompuServe FoxPro forum was extremely busy and Calvin Hsia, then an independent developer, now Developer Lead on the Fox team, created what we called "Calvin's List". It was a listing of the number of postings by person, including info on both messages sent and received. Being in the top 10 on Calvin's List any month was an accomplishment, though we discussed whether it was a good thing or a bad thing." As the story goes, some of the Microsoft people jumped on Calvin's List as a way to identify high contributors, and thus was born the MVP program.

== Earning the Microsoft MVP Award ==
The rules and guidelines to getting awarded as a Microsoft MVP are not strictly defined. The reason for this is that every Microsoft MVP contributes to the community in different ways. However, the largest key indicator Microsoft looks for when considering someone for the Microsoft MVP Award is how much impact their activities over the last 12 months have on the community.

== Cancellation and reinstatement ==
On October 22, 1999, a Microsoft executive sent out a message announcing the cancellation of the MVP program. This may have been in response to a recent suit against AOL by its newsgroup leaders, who felt that they deserved to be paid for the time they put in online. After an outpouring of online support to the MVP program, including many emails sent directly to Bill Gates and Steve Ballmer, Microsoft announced three days later that the cancellation had been rescinded. This then led to discussions across the company about which division would own the expenses for this program. The program stayed in support, but additional investments were made - one of the original CompuServe engineers was brought in for a new position as Director of Community, reinvigorating the MVP program with a dedicated project coordinator, site resources and support engineers. The program became far more successful through these efforts, expanding its global footprint and receiving coverage with more than 100 independent press articles, eventually landing as one of Microsoft's Board of Director's 7 Big Bets for 2007.

== See also ==
- List of computer-related awards
