= DeGoogle =

Campaign to stop using Google products

The DeGoogle movement (also called the de-Google movement) is a grassroots campaign that has spawned as privacy advocates urge users to stop using Google products entirely due to growing privacy concerns regarding the company.

== Background ==
As the growing market share of the internet giant creates monopolistic power for the company in digital spaces, increasing numbers of journalists and individuals have noted the difficulty to find alternatives to the company's products.

Some projects, such as ungoogled-chromium, /e/ and MicroG primarily distinguish themselves from Google-maintained products by their lessened dependence on the company's infrastructure.

It can be seen as part of a broader opposition to big tech companies, sometimes referred to as "techlash".

== History ==
In 2008, Lee Hinman began making the move away from Google tools, 'in the interests of privacy', and blogged about his experience in a post entitled 'De-googling'.

In 2010, publisher Jack Yan used the term as he removed himself from Google's services, citing privacy concerns. Five days later, Kirk McElhearn wrote a piece about "dropping Google" in Macworld, citing privacy, deletions of Blogger blogs, and censorship.

In 2013, John Koetsier of Venturebeat said Amazon's Kindle Fire Android-based tablet was "a de-Google-ized version of Android".

In 2014, John Simpson of US News wrote about the "right to be forgotten" by Google and other search engines.

In 2015, Derek Scally of Irish Times wrote an article on how to "de-Google your life".

In 2016 Kris Carlon of Android Authority suggested that users of CyanogenMod 14 could "de-Google" their phones, because CyanogenMod works fine without Google apps too.

In 2018, Nick Lucchesi of Inverse wrote about how ProtonMail was promoting how to "be able to completely de-Google-fy your life". Tuta (email) also called on Internet users to leave Google completely for privacy reasons.

Lifehacker's Brendan Hesse wrote a detailed tutorial on "quitting Google".

Gizmodo journalist Kashmir Hill claims that she missed meetings and had difficulties organizing meet ups without the use of Google Calendar. In 2020, she wrote another article on avoiding large tech companies in which she discussed how disabling Google prevented her from using Dropbox, Uber, Lyft, and Yelp, and described Amazon and Google as "so embedded in the architecture of the digital world that even their competitors had to rely on their services".

In 2022, comic artist and activist Leah Elliott published a Creative Commons web comic criticizing Google Chrome's privacy practices, entitled "Contra Chrome".

== Response ==
=== Huawei ===
In 2019, Huawei gave a refund to phone owners in the Philippines who were inhibited from using services provided by Google because so few alternatives exist that the absence of the company's products made normal internet use unfeasible.

In 2020, Huawei launched Petal as an alternative to Google Search.

=== Android distributions without Google software ===
In April 2019, GrapheneOS announced its release, a privacy-focused android distribution without any Google app installed by default. The open source Android (AOSP)-based operating system LineageOS (a fork of Cyanogen) was officially launched on 24 December 2016.

== See also ==
- Googlization
- Criticism of Google
- Big Tech
- Alt-tech
