= Paul Buchheit =

American computer engineer (born 1977)

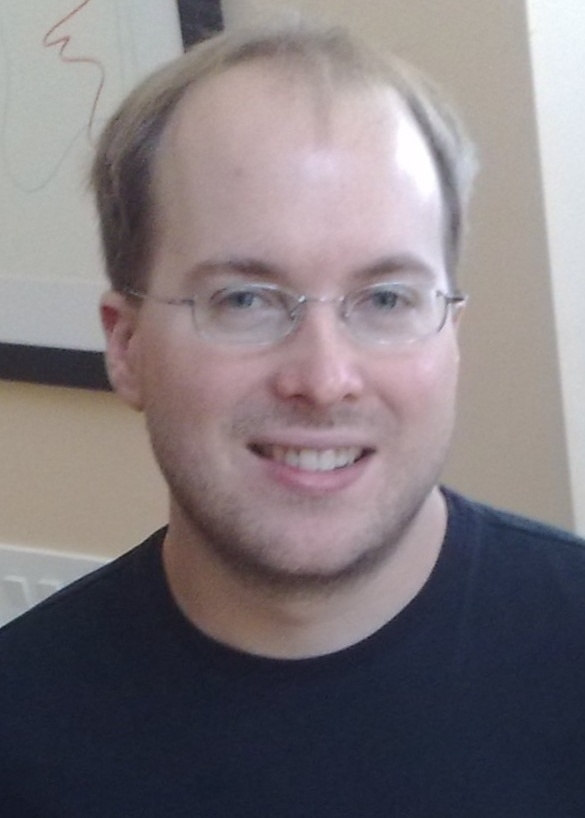
- Born: Paul T. Buchheit; November 7, 1977 (age 48); Webster, New York, U.S.
- Education: Case Western Reserve University (BS)
- Occupations: Angel investor Software developer
- Employer(s): Google; Facebook; FriendFeed; Y Combinator
- Known for: Gmail; Frienders; Don't be evil motto
- Website: paulbuchheit.blogspot.com

Paul T. Buchheit (born November 7, 1977) is an American computer engineer and entrepreneur who created the email service Gmail. He developed the original prototype of Google AdSense as part of his work on Gmail. He also suggested Google's former company motto Don't be evil in a 2000 meeting on company values, after the motto was initially coined in 1999 by engineer Amit Patel.

== Early life and education ==
Buchheit was born on November 7, 1977, in Webster, New York. He attended the Case Western Reserve University in Cleveland, Ohio where he studied computer engineering and was part of the college's rowing crew.

== Career ==
Buchheit worked at Intel and later became the 23rd employee at Google. At Google, he began developing Gmail in 2001, with its innovations in search and storage. He also developed the original prototype of what would become AdSense. Leaving Google in 2006, Buchheit started FriendFeed, which was launched in 2007, with partner Bret Taylor. FriendFeed was acquired by Facebook in 2009 in a private transaction that resulted in Buchheit becoming a Facebook employee. In 2010, Buchheit left Facebook to become a partner at the investment firm Y Combinator. From 2006 (when he started investing) until 2008, Buchheit invested about $1.21 million in 32 companies..

He continues to oversee angel investments of his own in "about 40" startups (by his own estimate) and is active with Y Combinator.

Buchheit won the 2011 The Economist innovation awards in the computing and telecommunications field.
