= Endoxon =

Mapping company acquired by Google

Endoxon is a company that was partially acquired by Google in December 2006. The company is based in Lucerne, Switzerland. Endoxon now provides the maps for European countries in Google Maps. Its products included maps that have geo-referenced data with high-resolution aerial and satellite images for dynamic internet, and mobile services.
