= Googlization =

Neologism

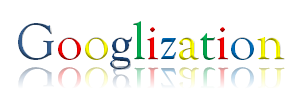

Googlization is a neologism that describes the expansion of Google's search technologies and aesthetics into more markets, web applications, and contexts, including traditional institutions such as the library (see Google Books Library Project). The rapid rise of search media, particularly Google, is part of new media history and draws attention to issues of access and to relationships between commercial interests and media.

== History of term ==
In 2003, John Battelle and Alex Salkever first introduced the term googlization to mean the dominance of Google over nearly all forms of informational commerce on the web. Initially specializing in text-based Internet searching, Google has expanded its services to include image searching, web-based email, online mapping, video sharing, news delivery, instant messaging, mobile phones, and services aimed at the academic community. Google has entered partnerships with established media interests such as Time Warner AOL, News Corporation, The New York Times, and various news agencies such as the Associated Press, Agence France-Presse, and the Press Association. Google has therefore become a giant with complex entanglements with traditional and new media.

== Definition ==
The term Googlization is not universally accepted as a definition for this phenomenon. According to Harro Haijboer, Googlization seems to be an undisputed term, most of the time the term is taken for fact without critically investigating it.

The term may be valid in current development but, after a critical look at the history of search engines, may not be as correctly formulated as one might think. My main questions are if the term Googlization is correct in a historical perspective? If Microsoft search engines (MSN, Live Search and Bing) are Googlized? ...or if Google is "Microsoftized"? I suspected to find evidence that both search engines (Microsoft and Google) have had their influence onto each other. There is no way of saying if Googlization has fully taken place on Microsoft search or that there has been a form of "Microsoftization" on the part of Google. In this light the term Googlization seems to be inappropriate and should be rethought of.

Many information professionals would define the term as "digitizing a library or making something into a Google product". However, the definition is constantly and rapidly changing. Googlization can also mean that ever "increasing amounts of accessible information [are] available on the Internet; Google makes it easy and convenient to find in one place"; however, Google only makes information which already exists more accessible, rather than creating new information.

== Development ==
Geert Lovink argues against the society's growing dependency on Google search retrieval. Richard A. Rogers points out that Googlization connotes media concentration—an important political economy style critique of Google's taking over of one service after another online; Liz Losh also claims that the Googlization of the BNF has brought considerable public attention in major magazine and newspapers in France.

The Googlization of Everything, a book published in March 2011 by Siva Vaidhyanathan, provides a critical interpretation of how Google is disrupting culture, commerce, and community. In Vaidhyanathan's own words "the book will answer three key questions: What does the world look like through the lens of Google?; How is Google's ubiquity affecting the production and dissemination of knowledge?; and how has the corporation altered the rules and practices that govern other companies, institutions, and states?" Vaidhyanathan defines Googlization as how, "... since the search engine first appeared and spread through word of mouth for a dozen years, Google has permeated our culture. ... Google is used as a noun and a verb everywhere from adolescent conversations to scripts for Sex and the City." Vaidhyanathan, also has a blog where he documented the development of the book and any developments or news about Googlization and Google in general. His basic argument is that we may approve of Google today, but the company very easily could use our information against us in ways that are beneficial to its business, not society. Both the book and the blog are subtitled "How One Company Is Disrupting Culture, Commerce, and Community... and Why we Should Worry."

== See also ==
- Cocacolonization
- Criticism of Google
- Don't be evil
- McDonaldization
- Surveillance capitalism
- Uberisation
