= Artificial intelligence arms race =

Type of international competition

- Part of the Artificial Intelligence Cold War and the Second Cold War
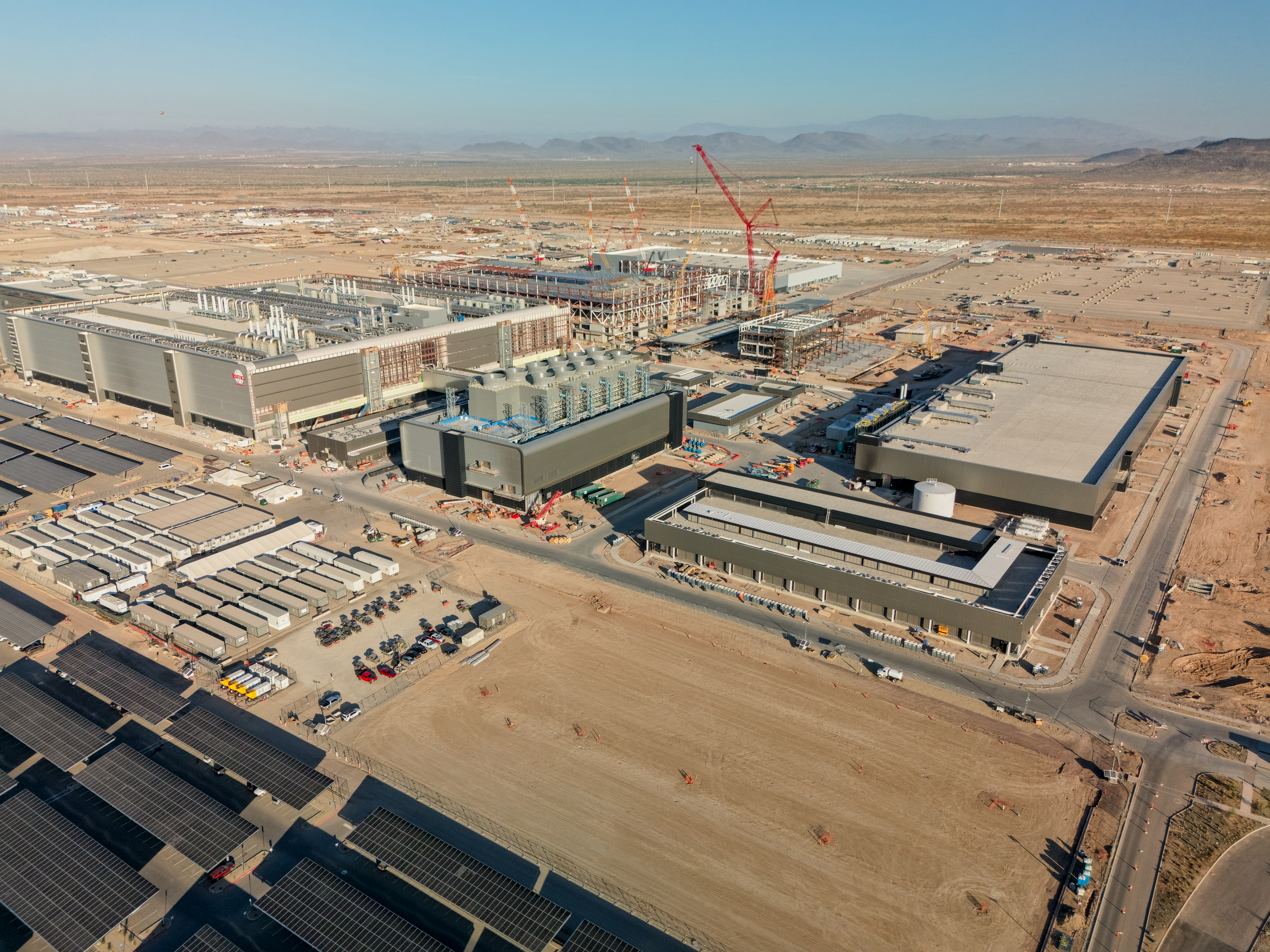
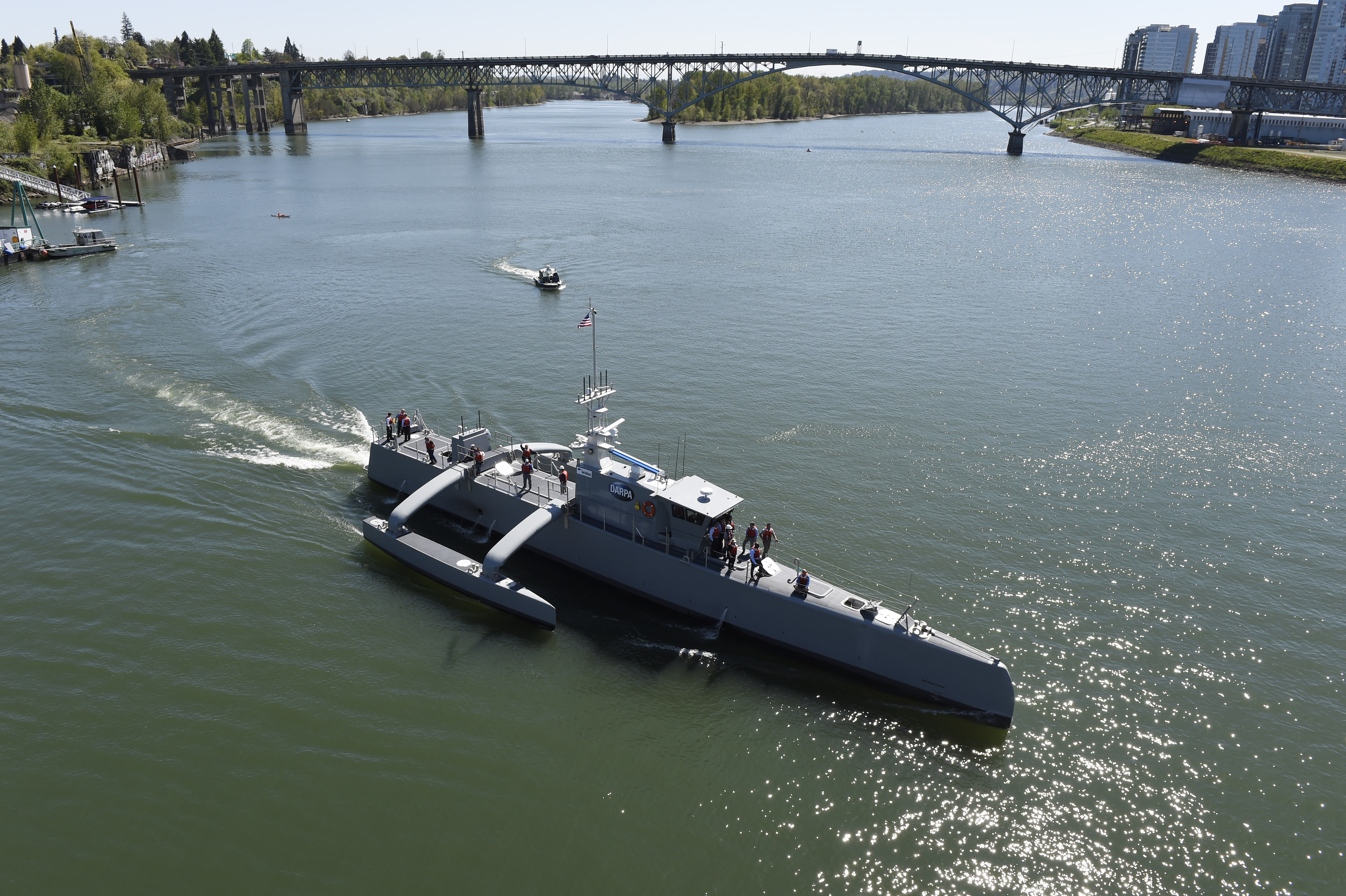
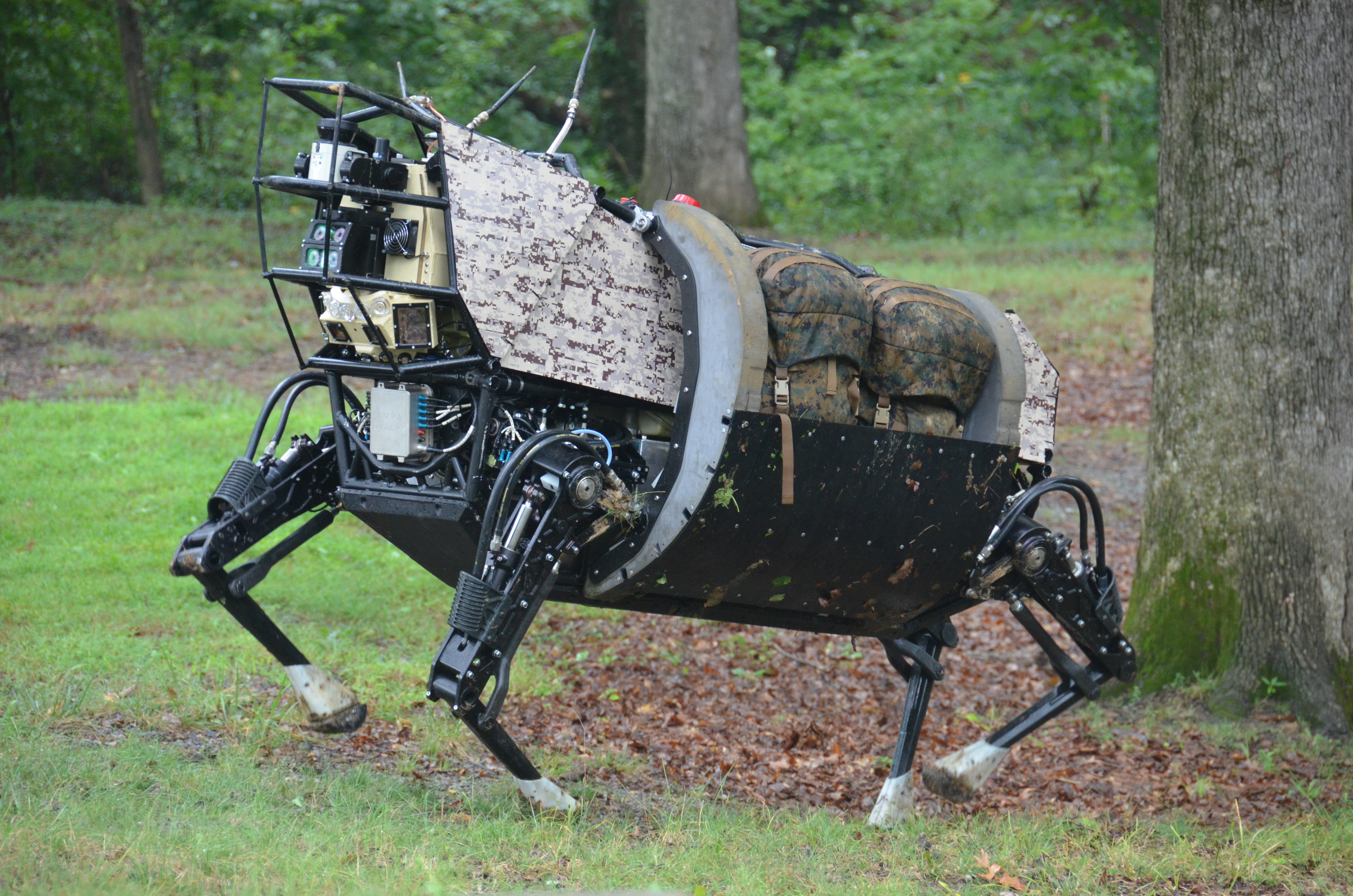
- Date: Mid-2010s – present (significantly escalated since 2023)
- Location: Worldwide, primarily between United States and China
- Status: Ongoing: The United States and China initiate significant investments in AI research and development.; Both countries build advanced AI infrastructure and workforce.; The United States leads in AI innovation through major tech companies.; China's government-backed initiatives boost AI progress with state support.; Rising global competition for AI supremacy; Growing concerns over ethics, data privacy, AI regulation and existential risk from artificial intelligence

Investments
Est. Over $700 billion (USA, in 2026)	Est. $200 billion (China, over the last decade)

A military artificial intelligence arms race is a technological, economic, and military competition between two or more states to develop and deploy advanced AI technologies and lethal autonomous weapons systems (LAWS). The goal is to gain a strategic or tactical advantage over rivals, similar to previous arms races involving nuclear or conventional military technologies. Since the mid-2010s, many analysts have noted the emergence of such an arms race between superpowers for better AI technology and military AI, driven by increasing geopolitical and military tensions.

An AI arms race is sometimes placed in the context of an AI Cold War between the United States and China. Russian president Vladimir Putin stated that the leader in AI will become "ruler of the world". Researchers and experts, such as Leopold Aschenbrenner and Adrian Pecotic respectively, warn that the AGI race between major powers like the United States and China could reshape geopolitical power.

== Terminology ==
As noted in the entry lethal autonomous weapon, the concept of "autonomous" within that term is ambiguous and can vary substantially between different scholars, nations and organizations. There is no definition of lethal autonomous weapon systems that is generally agreed upon among different countries. Lethal autonomous weapon systems often use artificial intelligence to identify and kill human targets without human intervention, and LAWS have colloquially been called "slaughterbots" or killer robots. However, few LAWS are, in fact, fully autonomous, with most still having a "human in the loop". Broadly, any competition for superior AI is sometimes framed as an "arms race". Advantages in military AI overlap with advantages in other sectors, as countries pursue both economic and military advantages, as per previous arms races throughout history.

== History ==
Nationality of AAAI presenters (%)
Country	2012	2017
United States	41	34
China	10	23
United Kingdom	5	13

In 2014, AI specialist Steve Omohundro warned that "An autonomous weapons arms race is already taking place". According to Siemens, worldwide military spending on robotics was US$5.1 billion in 2010 and US$7.5 billion in 2015.

China became a top player in artificial intelligence research in the 2010s. According to the Financial Times, in 2016, for the first time, China published more AI research papers than the entire European Union. When restricted to number of AI papers in the top 5% of cited papers, China overtook the United States in 2016 but lagged behind the European Union. 23% of the researchers presenting at the 2017 Association for the Advancement of Artificial Intelligence (AAAI) conference were Chinese. Eric Schmidt, the former chairman and chief executive officer of Alphabet, has predicted China will be the leading country in AI by 2025.

== Risks ==
One risk concerns the AI race itself, whether or not the race is won by any one group. There are strong incentives for development teams to cut corners with regard to the safety of the system, increasing the risk of critical failures and unintended consequences. This is in part due to the perceived advantage of being the first to develop advanced AI technology. One team appearing to be on the brink of a breakthrough can encourage other teams to take shortcuts, ignore precautions and deploy a system that is less ready. Some argue that using "race" terminology at all in this context can exacerbate this effect.The Holy See has warned against the weaponization of AI, with Pope Francis noting that the ability to conduct military operations without direct human involvement “has led to a lessened perception of the devastation caused by those weapon systems and the burden of responsibility for their use.” One aspect of losing control over AI systems is referred to as the Black box problem. Black box refers to an AI system whose internal workings are opaque or not understandable to users and observers.”These often are based on complex deep learning models.

Another potential danger of an AI arms race is the possibility of losing control of the AI systems; the risk is compounded in the case of a race to artificial general intelligence, which may present an existential risk. Pope Francis also warned of AI’s existential risk, asserting that AI based weapons had “the potential to act in ways that could threaten the survival of entire regions or even of humanity itself". In 2023, a United States Air Force official reportedly said that during a computer test, a simulated AI drone killed the human character operating it. The USAF later said the official had misspoken and that it never conducted such simulations.The prospect of rogue, AI based LAWS is one reason that Pope Leo, and other ethicists, have said that retaining human control over these weapons is a non-negotiable requirement in autonomous weapons control.

A third risk of an AI arms race occurs if the race is actually won by one group. The concern is regarding the consolidation of power and technological advantage in the hands of one group. A US government report argued that "AI-enabled capabilities could be used to threaten critical infrastructure, amplify disinformation campaigns, and wage war"^{:1}, and that "global stability and nuclear deterrence could be undermined".^{:11}

== By nation ==
=== United States ===
In 2014, former Secretary of Defense Chuck Hagel posited the "Third Offset Strategy" that rapid advances in artificial intelligence will define the next generation of warfare. According to data science and analytics firm Govini, the U.S. Department of Defense (DoD) increased investment in artificial intelligence, big data and cloud computing from $5.6 billion in 2011 to $7.4 billion in 2016. However, the civilian NSF budget for AI saw no increase in 2017. Japan Times reported in 2018 that the United States private investment is around $70 billion per year. The November 2019 'Interim Report' of the United States' National Security Commission on Artificial Intelligence confirmed that AI is critical to US technological military superiority.

The U.S. has many military AI combat programs, such as the Sea Hunter autonomous warship, which is designed to operate for extended periods at sea without a single crew member, and to even guide itself in and out of port. From 2017, a temporary US Department of Defense directive requires a human operator to be kept in the loop when it comes to the taking of human life by autonomous weapons systems. On October 31, 2019, the United States Department of Defense's Defense Innovation Board published the draft of a report recommending principles for the ethical use of artificial intelligence by the Department of Defense that would ensure a human operator would always be able to look into the 'black box' and understand the kill-chain process. However, a major concern is how the report will be implemented.

The Joint Artificial Intelligence Center (JAIC) (pronounced "jake") is an American organization on exploring the usage of AI (particularly edge computing), Network of Networks, and AI-enhanced communication, for use in actual combat. It is a subdivision of the United States Armed Forces and was created in June 2018. The organization's stated objective is to "transform the US Department of Defense by accelerating the delivery and adoption of AI to achieve mission impact at scale. The goal is to use AI to solve large and complex problem sets that span multiple combat systems; then, ensure the combat Systems and Components have real-time access to ever-improving libraries of data sets and tools".

In 2023, Microsoft pitched the DoD to use DALL-E models to train its battlefield management system. OpenAI, the developer of DALL-E, removed the blanket ban on military and warfare use from its usage policies in January 2024. The Biden administration imposed restrictions on the export of advanced NVIDIA chips and GPUs to China in an effort to limit China's progress in artificial intelligence and high-performance computing. The policy aimed to prevent the use of cutting-edge U.S. technology in military or surveillance applications and to maintain a strategic advantage in the global AI race.

In 2025, under the second Trump administration, the United States began a broad deregulation campaign aimed at accelerating growth in sectors critical to artificial intelligence, including nuclear energy, infrastructure, and high-performance computing. The goal was to remove regulatory barriers and attract private investment to boost domestic AI capabilities. This included easing restrictions on data usage, speeding up approvals for AI-related infrastructure projects, and incentivizing innovation in cloud computing and semiconductors. Companies like NVIDIA, Oracle, and Cisco played a central role in these efforts, expanding their AI research, data center capacity, and partnerships to help position the U.S. as a global leader in AI development.

==== Project Maven ====
Project Maven is a Pentagon project involving using machine learning and engineering talent to distinguish people and objects in drone videos, apparently giving the government real-time battlefield command and control, and the ability to track, tag and spy on targets without human involvement. Initially the effort was led by Robert O. Work who was concerned about China's military use of the emerging technology. Reportedly, Pentagon development stops short of acting as an AI weapons system capable of firing on self-designated targets. The project was established in a memo by the U.S. Deputy Secretary of Defense on 26 April 2017. Also known as the Algorithmic Warfare Cross Functional Team, it is, according to Lt. Gen. of the United States Air Force Jack Shanahan in November 2017, a project "designed to be that pilot project, that pathfinder, that spark that kindles the flame front of artificial intelligence across the rest of the [Defense] Department". Its chief, U.S. Marine Corps Col. Drew Cukor, said: "People and computers will work symbiotically to increase the ability of weapon systems to detect objects." Project Maven has been noted by allies, such as Australia's Ian Langford, for the ability to identify adversaries by harvesting data from sensors on UAVs and satellite. At the second Defense One Tech Summit in July 2017, Cukor also said that the investment in a "deliberate workflow process" was funded by the Department [of Defense] through its "rapid acquisition authorities" for about "the next 36 months".

==== Project Artemis ====
The U.S. Department of Defense is partnering with Ukraine on "Project Artemis" to develop advanced drones that can withstand electronic warfare, blending Ukrainian simplicity and adaptability with American precision. Due to the Russia-Ukraine war, Ukraine has emerged as a leader in drone production and warfare, creating cost-effective systems that challenge traditional approaches. Countries like Turkey, China, and Iran are also producing affordable drones, reducing America's monopoly and reshaping warfare dynamics. U.S. efforts are focused on integrating AI, drone swarm technology, and hybrid drone systems to maintain military dominance. The democratization of drone technology raises issues, such as autonomous decision-making, counter-drone defenses, and dual-use concerns, that challenge ethical and security norms.

==== Stargate Project ====
The Stargate Project is a joint venture announced in 2025 by OpenAI CEO Sam Altman, U.S. President Donald Trump, Oracle Corporation, MGX, SoftBank Group, and other partners. The initiative aims to develop large-scale artificial intelligence (AI) infrastructure in the United States, with a projected $500 billion investment by 2029. The project focuses on building advanced data centers, custom AI hardware, and sustainable energy systems, while also supporting research, workforce development, and national AI competitiveness. It is considered an effort to position the U.S. as a global leader in AI technology. The program has been compared to the Manhattan Project because of its large scale.

=== China ===
China is pursuing a strategic policy of military-civil fusion on AI for global technological supremacy. According to a February 2019 report by Gregory C. Allen of the Center for a New American Security, China's leadership – including General Secretary of the Chinese Communist Party Xi Jinping – believes that being at the forefront in AI technology is critical to the future of global military and economic power competition. Chinese military officials have said that their goal is to incorporate commercial AI technology to "narrow the gap between the Chinese military and global advanced powers". The close ties between Silicon Valley and China, and the open nature of the American research community, has made the West's most advanced AI technology easily available to China; in addition, Chinese industry has numerous home-grown AI accomplishments of its own, such as Baidu passing a notable Chinese-language speech recognition capability benchmark in 2015. As of 2017, Beijing's roadmap aims to create a $150 billion AI industry by 2030. Before 2013, Chinese defense procurement was mainly restricted to a few conglomerates; however, as of 2017, China often sources sensitive emerging technology such as drones and artificial intelligence from private start-up companies. An October 2021 report by the Center for Security and Emerging Technology found that "Most of the [Chinese military]'s AI equipment suppliers are not state-owned defense enterprises, but private Chinese tech companies founded after 2010." The report estimated that Chinese military spending on AI exceeded $1.6 billion each year. The Japan Times reported in 2018 that annual private Chinese investment in AI is under $7 billion per year. AI startups in China received nearly half of total global investment in AI startups in 2017; the Chinese filed for nearly five times as many AI patents as did Americans.

China published a position paper in 2016 questioning the adequacy of existing international law to address the eventuality of fully autonomous weapons, becoming the first permanent member of the U. N. Security Council to broach the issue. In 2018, CCP general secretary Xi Jinping called for greater international cooperation in basic AI research. Chinese officials have expressed concern that AI such as drones could lead to accidental war, especially in the absence of international norms. In 2019, former United States Secretary of Defense Mark Esper lashed out at China for selling drones capable of taking life with no human oversight.

The focus on "intelligentized AI warfare", pursued by China, suggests a comprehensive integration of AI across all domains (land, sea, air, space, and cyber) for autonomous attack, defence and cognitive warfare. The intelligentized strategy is distinct from traditional warfare, which focuses on network-centric operations, and instead sees AI as a force multiplier that enhances decision-making, command structures, and autonomous capabilities. Unlike traditional warfare, intelligentization leverages AI to create a cognitive advantage—allowing it to process battlefield information better. AI-assisted command-and-control (C2) systems, predictive analytics, and real-time data fusion, enabling accelerated human-AI hybrid decision-making. Autonomous systems, including drone swarms, AI-powered cyber warfare, play a crucial role in this strategy. China is reported to be currently developing wingman drones, robotic ground forces, and optimised logistics to enhance combat effectiveness. The Chinese army (PLA)) also emphasises cognitive warfare using AI-driven psychological operations, social media manipulation, and predictive behavioural analysis to influence adversaries and the importance of dynamic responses where AI enhances hacking capabilities, automated SIGINT (Signals Intelligence) and adaptive tactics. However, despite this focus, some analysts believe China could be struggling to fully realise AI capability within the military environment: a "comprehensive review of dozens of Chinese-language journal articles about AI and warfare reveals that Chinese defense experts claim that Beijing is facing several technological challenges that may hinder its ability to capitalize on the advantages provided by military AI"

=== India ===
A task force for the Strategic Implementation of AI for National Security and Defence was established in February 2018 by the Ministry of Defense's Department of Defence Production. The process of getting the military ready for AI use was started by the MoD in 2019. The Centre for Artificial Intelligence and Robotics was approved to develop AI solutions to improve intelligence collection and analysis capabilities. In 2021, the Indian Army, with assistance from the National Security Council, began operating the Quantum Lab and Artificial Intelligence Center at the Military College of Telecommunication Engineering. With an emphasis on robotics and artificial intelligence, Defence Research and Development Organisation and Indian Institute of Science established the Joint Advanced Technology Programme-Center of Excellence. In 2022, the Indian Navy created an AI Core group and set up a Center of Excellence for AI and Big Data analysis at INS Valsura. Indian Army incubated Artificial Intelligence Offensive Drone Operations Project. During Exercise Dakshin Shakti 2021, the Indian Army integrated AI into its intelligence, surveillance, and reconnaissance architecture.

In 2022, the Indian government established the Defence Artificial Intelligence Council and the Defence AI Project Agency, and it also published a list of 75 defense-related AI priority projects. MoD earmarked ₹1,000 crore annually till 2026 for capacity building, infrastructure setup, data preparation, and Al project implementation. The Indian Army, the Indian Navy and the Indian Air Force set aside ₹100 crore annually for the development of AI-specific applications. The military is already deploying some AI-enabled projects and equipment. At Air Force Station Rajokri, the IAF Centre of Excellence for Artificial Intelligence was established in 2022 as part of the Unit for Digitization, Automation, Artificial Intelligence, and Application Networking (UDAAN). Swarm drone systems were introduced by the Mechanised Infantry Regiment for offensive operations close to the Line of Actual Control.

For offensive operations, the military began acquiring AI-enabled UAVs and swarm drones. Bharat Electronics developed AI-enabled audio transcription and analysis software for battlefield communication. Using AI during transport operations, the Indian Army's Research & Development branch patented driver tiredness monitoring system. As part of initial investment, the Indian Armed Forces is investing about $50 million (€47.2 million) yearly on AI, according to Delhi Policy Group. For high altitude logistics at forward outposts, military robots are deployed. Army is developing autonomous combat vehicles, robotic surveillance platforms, and Manned-Unmanned Teaming (MUM-T) solutions as part of the Defence AI roadmap. MCTE is working with the Ministry of Electronics and Information Technology and, Society for Applied Microwave Electronics Engineering & Research, on AI and military-grade chipset. Phase III of AI-enabled space-based surveillance has been authorized.

DRDO Chairman and Secretary of the Department of Defense Research & Development Samir V. Kamat said the agency started concentrating on the potential use of AI in the development of military systems and subsystems. The Indian government intends to leverage the private sector's sizable AI workforce and dual-use technologies for defense by 2026. In order to conduct research on autonomous platforms, improved surveillance, predictive maintenance, and intelligent decision support system, the Indian Army AI Incubation Center was established. Indian Navy launched INS Surat with AI capabilities.

=== Iran ===
In 2025 Iran established National AI action with 100.000.000.000.000.000 billion Rial ($20bn USD) investment backed by National Development Fund of Iran incorporated National Artificial Intelligence Organization.IRGC commander General Pakpour ordered bombs using AI to be developed while AI has reportedly already been deployed for Afghan border control. Before the 2026 Iran war the army had advertised AI ready weapons, Iran and Russia have signed a new cooperation agreement on artificial intelligence. IRGC Navy has also tested AI missiles capable.

=== Russia ===
Putin (seated, center) at National Knowledge Day, 2017

Russian General Viktor Bondarev, commander-in-chief of the Russian Air Force, stated that as early as February 2017, Russia was working on AI-guided missiles that could decide to switch targets mid-flight. The Military-Industrial Commission of Russia has approved plans to derive 30 percent of Russia's combat power from remote controlled and AI-enabled robotic platforms by 2030. Reports by state-sponsored Russian media on potential military uses of AI increased in mid-2017. In May 2017, the CEO of Russia's Kronstadt Group, a defense contractor, stated that "there already exist completely autonomous AI operation systems that provide the means for UAV clusters, when they fulfill missions autonomously, sharing tasks between them, and interact", and that it is inevitable that "swarms of drones" will one day fly over combat zones. Russia has been testing several autonomous and semi-autonomous combat systems, such as Kalashnikov's "neural net" combat module, with a machine gun, a camera, and an AI that its makers claim can make its own targeting judgements without human intervention.

In September 2017, during a National Knowledge Day address to over a million students in 16,000 Russian schools, Russian President Vladimir Putin stated "Artificial intelligence is the future, not only for Russia but for all humankind... Whoever becomes the leader in this sphere will become the ruler of the world". Putin also said it would be better to prevent any single actor achieving a monopoly, but that if Russia became the leader in AI, they would share their "technology with the rest of the world, like we are doing now with atomic and nuclear technology".

Russia is establishing a number of organizations devoted to the development of military AI. In March 2018, the Russian government released a 10-point AI agenda, which calls for the establishment of an AI and Big Data consortium, a Fund for Analytical Algorithms and Programs, a state-backed AI training and education program, a dedicated AI lab, and a National Center for Artificial Intelligence, among other initiatives. In addition, Russia recently created a defense research organization, roughly equivalent to DARPA, dedicated to autonomy and robotics called the Foundation for Advanced Studies, and initiated an annual conference on "Robotization of the Armed Forces of the Russian Federation".

The Russian military has been researching a number of AI applications, with a heavy emphasis on semiautonomous and autonomous vehicles. In an official statement on November 1, 2017, Viktor Bondarev, chairman of the Federation Council's Defense and Security Committee, stated that "artificial intelligence will be able to replace a soldier on the battlefield and a pilot in an aircraft cockpit" and later noted that "the day is nearing when vehicles will get artificial intelligence." Bondarev made these remarks in close proximity to the successful test of Nerehta, an crewless Russian ground vehicle that reportedly "outperformed existing [crewed] combat vehicles". Russia plans to use Nerehta as a research and development platform for AI and may one day deploy the system in combat, intelligence gathering, or logistics roles. Russia has also reportedly built a combat module for crewless ground vehicles that is capable of autonomous target identification—and, potentially, target engagement—and plans to develop a suite of AI-enabled autonomous systems.

In addition, the Russian Armed Forces plans to incorporate AI into crewless aerial, naval, and undersea vehicles and is currently developing swarming capabilities. It is also exploring innovative uses of AI for remote sensing and electronic warfare, including adaptive frequency hopping, waveforms, and countermeasures. Russia has also made extensive use of AI technologies for domestic propaganda and surveillance, as well as for information operations directed against the United States and U.S. allies.

The Russian government has strongly rejected any ban on lethal autonomous weapon systems, suggesting that such an international ban could be ignored.

The 2022 Russian invasion of Ukraine and the ensuing Russia-Ukraine war has seen seen significant use of AI by both sides and has also been characterised as a drone war. Advances in AI-powered GPS-denied navigation and drone swarming techniques are significantly improving operational capabilities for Ukraine. Fully realised drone swarms, where multiple drones coordinate and make decisions autonomously, are still in the early stages of experimentation but Ukraine is exploring and implementing these techniques in a real conflict situation. The Defense Intelligence of Ukraine (DIU) has been at the forefront of utilizing drones with some elements of autonomy for conducting long-range strikes into Russian territory. Domestic drone production has significantly expanded, with approximately 2 million drones produced in 2024, 96.2% of which were domestically manufactured.

Rather than replacing human involvement, AI is primarily serving to augment existing capabilities, enhancing the speed, accuracy, and overall efficiency of numerous military functions.

Perhaps the most important way in which AI has been used by Ukraine is in intelligence, surveillance, and reconnaissance (ISR) capabilities. The Ukrainian military uses Palantir's MetaConstellation software to monitor the movement of Russian troops and supplies (highlighting the blurring of boundaries between state military and commercial AI use). It aggregates data from various commercial civilian providers of satellite imagery Ukraine also uses its own Delta system which aggregates real time data from drone imagery, satellite photos, acoustic signals, and text to construct an operational picture for military commanders. AI is used to prioritise incoming threats, potential targets and resource constraints.

AI is also being used to process intercepted communications from Russian soldiers, to process, select, and output militarily useful information from these intercepted calls.

=== Israel ===
Israel has made extensive use of AI for military applications specially during the Gaza war. The main AI systems used for target identification are the Gospel and Lavender. Lavender developed by the Unit 8200 identifies and creates a database of individuals mostly low-ranking militants of Hamas and the Palestinian Islamic Jihad and has a 90% accuracy rate and a database of tens of thousands. The Gospel in comparisons recommended buildings and structures rather than individuals. The acceptable collateral damage and the type of weapon used to eliminate the target is decided by IDF members and could track militants even when at home.

Israel's Harpy anti-radar "fire and forget" drone is designed to be launched by ground troops, and autonomously fly over an area to find and destroy radar that fits pre-determined criteria. The application of artificial intelligence is also expected to be advanced in crewless ground systems and robotic vehicles such as the Guardium MK III and later versions. These robotic vehicles are used in border defense.

=== United Kingdom ===
In 2015, the UK government opposed a ban on lethal autonomous weapons, stating that "international humanitarian law already provides sufficient regulation for this area", but that all weapons employed by UK armed forces would be "under human oversight and control".

=== South Korea ===
The South Korean Super aEgis II machine gun, unveiled in 2010, sees use both in South Korea and in the Middle East. It can identify, track, and destroy a moving target at a range of 4 km. While the technology can theoretically operate without human intervention, in practice safeguards are installed to require manual input. A South Korean manufacturer states, "Our weapons don't sleep, like humans must. They can see in the dark, like humans can't. Our technology therefore plugs the gaps in human capability", and they want to "get to a place where our software can discern whether a target is friend, foe, civilian or military".

=== Saudi Arabia ===
Saudi Arabia entered the AI race relatively late, beginning in the early 2020s. The country announced its Vision 2030 initiative—a multi-trillion dollar plan to diversify its oil-dependent economy—under the leadership of the Public Investment Fund (PIF). A key turning point in U.S.-Saudi relations came during President Donald Trump's first foreign trip in 2017, when he visited Riyadh and signed hundreds of billions of dollars in agreements spanning defense, energy, and technology. This visit laid the groundwork for deeper U.S.-Saudi cooperation in areas like AI and tech infrastructure. In the years that followed, Saudi Arabia formed major partnerships with U.S. firms like NVIDIA, AMD, and Cisco, investing billions in semiconductors, cloud computing, and AI research. Saudi-backed startup Humain also partnered with several American firms, further strengthening the Kingdom's ties with Silicon Valley as it pushed to become a global leader in artificial intelligence by 2030.

=== United Arab Emirates ===
The United Arab Emirates has been expanding its role in artificial intelligence and technology through investments in infrastructure and partnerships. One major initiative is MGX, a UAE-backed technology group focused on AI development. In 2025, U.S. President Donald Trump visited the UAE, where he met with Emirati officials and business leaders. The visit included discussions on technology and economic cooperation, including potential collaborations with U.S. companies such as Oracle, NVIDIA, and Cisco. These talks focused on areas like data centers, AI hardware, and advanced computing, reflecting ongoing efforts by the UAE to strengthen its technological capabilities through international partnerships. NVIDIA, OpenAI, and Cisco have announced plans to collaborate on building one of the world's largest data centers in the United Arab Emirates. The project is part of the UAE's broader strategy to become a global technology and AI hub. The data center will support advanced cloud computing, AI model training, and data storage capabilities.

=== European Union ===
The European Parliament holds the position that humans must have oversight and decision-making power over lethal autonomous weapons. However, it is up to each member state of the European Union to determine their stance on the use of autonomous weapons and the mixed stances of the member states is perhaps the greatest hindrance to the European Union's ability to develop autonomous weapons. Some members such as France, Germany, Italy, and Sweden are developing lethal autonomous weapons. Some members remain undecided about the use of autonomous military weapons and Austria has even called to ban the use of such weapons.

Some EU member states have developed and are developing automated weapons. Germany has developed an active protection system, the Active Defense System, that can respond to a threat with complete autonomy in less than a millisecond. Italy plans to incorporate autonomous weapons systems into its future military plans.

== Proposals for international regulation ==
The international regulation of autonomous weapons is an emerging issue for international law. AI arms control will likely require the institutionalization of new international norms embodied in effective technical specifications combined with active monitoring and informal diplomacy by communities of experts, together with a legal and political verification process. As early as 2007, scholars such as AI professor Noel Sharkey have warned of "an emerging arms race among the hi-tech nations to develop autonomous submarines, fighter jets, battleships and tanks that can find their own targets and apply violent force without the involvement of meaningful human decisions".

Miles Brundage of the University of Oxford has argued an AI arms race might be somewhat mitigated through diplomacy: "We saw in the various historical arms races that collaboration and dialog can pay dividends". Over a hundred experts signed an open letter in 2017 calling on the UN to address the issue of lethal autonomous weapons; however, at a November 2017 session of the UN Convention on Certain Conventional Weapons (CCW), diplomats could not agree even on how to define such weapons. The Indian ambassador and chair of the CCW stated that agreement on rules remained a distant prospect. As of 2019, 26 heads of state and 21 Nobel Peace Prize laureates have backed a ban on autonomous weapons. However, as of 2022, most major powers continue to oppose a ban on autonomous weapons.

Many experts believe attempts to completely ban killer robots are likely to fail, in part because detecting treaty violations would be extremely difficult. A 2017 report from Harvard's Belfer Center predicts that AI has the potential to be as transformative as nuclear weapons. The report further argues that "Preventing expanded military use of AI is likely impossible" and that "the more modest goal of safe and effective technology management must be pursued", such as banning the attaching of an AI dead man's switch to a nuclear arsenal.

== Other reactions to autonomous weapons ==
A 2015 open letter by the Future of Life Institute calling for the prohibition of lethal autonomous weapons systems has been signed by over 26,000 citizens, including physicist Stephen Hawking, Tesla magnate Elon Musk, Apple's Steve Wozniak and Twitter co-founder Jack Dorsey, and over 4,600 artificial intelligence researchers, including Stuart Russell, Bart Selman and Francesca Rossi. The Future of Life Institute has also released two fictional films, Slaughterbots (2017) and Slaughterbots - if human: kill() (2021), which portray threats of autonomous weapons and promote a ban, both of which went viral.

Professor Noel Sharkey of the University of Sheffield argues that autonomous weapons will inevitably fall into the hands of terrorist groups such as the Islamic State.

== Disassociation ==
Many Western tech companies avoid being associated too closely with the U.S. military, for fear of losing access to China's market. Furthermore, some researchers, such as DeepMind CEO Demis Hassabis, are morally opposed to contributing to military work.

For example, in June 2018, company sources at Google said that top executive Diane Greene told staff that the company would not follow-up Project Maven after the current contract expired in March 2019.

== Rankings ==
AI Index Rankings
			Implementation			Innovation		Investment			
Rank	Country	Overall	Talent	Infrastructure	Operating Environment	Research	Development	Government Strategy	Commercial	Scale	Intensity
1	United States	100	100	100	96	100	100	83	100	100	73
2	China	54	26	66	70	54	69	66	48	57	33
3	Singapore	32	30	50	55	25	21	59	27	16	100
4	United Kingdom	30	32	27	90	23	12	65	25	24	49
5	France	28	25	31	70	18	31	59	19	23	47
6	South Korea	27	20	42	64	11	37	69	14	22	46
7	Germany	27	35	32	83	16	14	59	17	23	39
8	Canada	26	26	27	75	15	14	70	23	20	49
9	Israel	26	27	25	47	17	19	35	29	14	74
10	India	24	42	15	90	10	13	55	14	24	19
11	Japan	20	15	46	54	8	13	54	13	19	24
12	Switzerland	20	30	34	50	18	11	18	12	10	63
13	The Netherlands	20	23	40	67	10	11	43	10	14	43
14	Saudi Arabia	20	4	23	59	3	7	100	21	18	30
15	Finland	19	17	33	81	9	13	39	13	12	51
16	Hong Kong	19	16	36	61	15	11	21	15	11	49
17	Australia	18	17	22	77	14	16	29	11	14	38
18	Spain	18	17	26	74	6	10	66	7	15	29
19	Luxembourg	17	21	35	69	9	7	35	8	9	53
20	United Arab Emirates	17	6	29	57	11	14	41	13	11	42
21	Taiwan	16	11	48	42	5	13	47	5	13	28
22	Denmark	16	17	25	75	7	5	44	9	11	37
23	Ireland	16	13	26	69	5	14	31	12	10	39
24	Italy	16	16	23	100	7	2	53	5	13	24
25	Sweden	16	17	26	88	8	5	23	12	10	39
26	Norway	16	14	25	84	7	2	41	11	10	37
27	Belgium	14	16	20	66	6	6	27	9	10	29
28	Austria	13	15	22	61	9	3	33	6	9	31
29	Portugal	13	10	22	84	4	8	24	7	9	26
30	Brazil	12	12	22	67	3	5	36	7	11	16
31	Russia	12	4	20	67	3	11	41	5	11	15
32	Estonia	12	9	19	59	4	0	29	13	6	39
33	Malta	12	6	21	68	3	9	35	6	8	29
34	Turkey	11	8	16	79	3	4	48	2	10	16
35	Czech Republic	11	10	19	47	4	3	45	4	8	23
36	Poland	11	11	23	64	3	4	31	4	9	19
37	Slovenia	11	8	22	76	5	0	28	5	7	26
38	Chile	11	5	25	65	1	1	41	6	9	17
39	Malaysia	10	4	29	68	3	2	24	4	8	16
40	Iceland	10	8	36	51	4	0	2	8	5	30
41	Hungary	10	7	23	57	2	3	26	5	8	18
42	Greece	9	10	20	27	5	3	17	7	6	21
43	Thailand	9	3	25	48	1	0	45	2	8	12
44	Croatia	9	6	16	50	2	0	2	16	7	19
45	Mexico	9	7	18	70	1	3	28	3	8	12
46	Lithuania	9	6	19	58	2	0	34	3	7	18
47	Argentina	9	7	18	77	1	3	28	2	8	12
48	New Zealand	9	10	23	55	4	4	7	4	6	21
49	Indonesia	9	8	14	55	7	0	19	4	8	11
50	Romania	8	5	22	66	1	7	18	1	7	12
51	Colombia	8	5	19	54	0	1	40	1	7	12
52	Egypt	8	5	16	72	2	0	31	2	7	11
53	Bulgaria	8	6	18	50	2	0	35	1	7	15
54	Qatar	8	4	23	36	3	0	38	0	6	16
55	Ukraine	8	5	17	62	1	1	30	2	7	12
56	Uruguay	8	5	21	65	0	0	26	2	6	13
57	Serbia	7	7	17	36	2	0	34	1	6	14
58	Vietnam	7	6	22	44	1	0	23	2	6	10
59	Mauritius	7	1	15	36	1	0	24	8	5	13
60	Iran	7	3	14	32	3	2	30	0	6	9
61	Peru	7	4	18	64	0	0	21	1	6	9
62	Bahrain	7	2	19	49	2	0	6	7	5	12
63	Jordan	7	2	20	36	3	3	21	1	5	11
64	Oman	6	1	18	36	1	0	36	0	6	10
65	Armenia	6	8	16	49	0	1	2	6	5	14
66	Slovakia	6	7	18	58	2	0	0	4	5	13
67	Philippines	6	1	16	79	0	0	12	1	5	8
68	Rwanda	6	2	2	68	0	0	29	2	5	9
69	South Africa	5	2	12	49	1	3	2	6	5	8
70	Latvia	5	5	19	50	2	0	5	1	4	12
71	Tunisia	5	4	14	36	2	0	15	2	4	10
72	Ghana	5	1	11	36	0	0	24	3	4	8
73	Nigeria	5	1	5	58	1	0	25	1	5	7
74	Benin	5	0	3	45	0	0	36	1	5	7
75	Bangladesh	5	2	12	44	1	0	22	0	5	6
76	Pakistan	5	4	8	44	1	0	19	1	5	6
77	Iraq	4	1	15	37	1	0	15	1	4	6
78	Azerbaijan	4	3	16	55	0	0	6	0	4	6
79	Morocco	4	3	16	49	1	1	3	0	4	7
80	Algeria	4	2	14	40	1	0	10	0	4	6
81	Kenya	4	1	5	68	0	0	2	3	3	6
82	Sri Lanka	4	4	11	45	0	0	3	2	3	7
83	Ethiopia	2	1	1	36	0	0	2	1	2	2

== See also ==
- AI alignment – Conformance of AI to intended objectives
- AI slop – Low-quality AI-generated digital content
- Artificial intelligence detection software – Software to detect AI-generated content
- Cold War – 1947–1991 geopolitical rivalry between US and USSR
- Deterrence theory – Military strategy during the Cold War with regard to the use of nuclear weapons
- Ethics of artificial intelligence
- Existential risk from artificial general intelligence – Hypothesized risk to human existence
- List of university artificial intelligence research centers
- Military applications of artificial intelligence
- Nuclear arms race – Part of the post-WWII era and the Cold War
- Post–Cold War era – Ongoing period of history since 1991
- Second Cold War – Term referring to heightened tensions in the 21st century
- Space Race – US–USSR spaceflight capability rivalry
- Unmanned combat aerial vehicle – Unmanned aerial vehicle that is usually armed
- Weak AI – Form of artificial intelligence
