= Military applications of artificial intelligence =

== Overview ==
Artificial intelligence (AI) has many applications in warfare, including in communications, intelligence, and munitions control. Military AI systems are more capable of data processing than traditional systems. As a result, AI has become of increased use in military strategizing, weaponry, communications and control. AI is not limited to new weapons such as drones or strategic means such as cyberwar, as it can affect all forms of military planning.

== Uses ==
AI can enhance command and control, communications, sensors, integration and interoperability. AI technologies enable coordination of sensors and effectors, threat detection and identification, marking of enemy positions, target acquisition, coordination and deconfliction of distributed Joint Fires between networked combat vehicles, both human operated and autonomous.

AI has been used in military operations in Iraq, Syria, Ukraine, Iran and Israel. An AI-powered Automatic Target Classifying System, which employs sensors and algorithms to automatically identify and classify targets on radar, was patented by the Indian Army in 2025. It swiftly and precisely compares real-time data—like pictures or radar signals—to a database of stored data. It can be used for disposable purposes, such as guiding missiles.

=== Autonomous armament ===
Military drones capable of autonomous action are in wide use.

=== Command and control ===
In 2024 a Chinese laboratory at the Joint Operations College of the National Defense University in Shijiazhuang has created an AI military commander, for use in large-scale war simulations in the role of the commander-in-chief.

In 2024, the Ukrainian Army developed autonomous Kamikaze drones in order to make Russian interference during flight ineffective.

In November 2024, President of the United States Joe Biden and General Secretary of the Chinese Communist Party Xi Jinping affirmed the need to maintain human control over the use of nuclear weapons as opposed to artificial intelligence.

During the 2025 India–Pakistan conflict, the Indian military’s AI-enabled Meteorological Reporting System (Project Anumaan) was fed IMD data to assist the Artillery Combat Command and Control System with planning and accurate targeting with extended range artillery shells. Up to 200 kilometres (120 miles) inside Pakistan's borders, the system can predict exact wind speed and other meteorological conditions 48-72 hours ahead of time. The AI also aided in long-range missile trajectory calculations.

=== Military intelligence ===
In 2023, the United States Department of Defense tested generative AI based on large language models to digitize and integrate data across the military.

U.S. Army are exploring multi domain operations with other countries, collaborating in several areas of mutual interests.

Israel used two AI systems in the Gaza War to generate targets to strike: Habsora (translated: "the gospel") was used to compile a list of buildings to target, while "Lavender" produced a list of people. "Lavender" produced a list of 37,000 people to target. The list of buildings to target included Gazan private homes of people that were suspected of affiliation to Hamas operatives. The combination of AI targeting technology with policy shift away from avoiding civilian targets resulted in unprecedented numbers of civilian deaths. IDF officials say the program addresses the previous issue of the air force running out of targets. Using Habsora, officials say that suspected and junior Hamas members' homes significantly expand the "AI target bank." An internal source describes the process as a "mass assassination factory". By 2026, Israel expanded the use of AI in the military beyond Gaza, developing an army-wide "Operational Data and AI Factory," which was used for drone strikes, targeting and defensive measures as part of the war with Iran as well as in Lebanon. Some reports stated that AI-assisted systems were used to assist in identifying and tracking senior Iranian officials during Israeli military operations in the 2026 Iran conflict.

Researchers and human rights organizations described Israeli AI-assisted targeting systems as relying on large-scale analysis of surveillance footage, drones, mobile devices, and communications metadata to identify potential targets. They expressed concern that such systems may occasionally misidentify individuals or contribute to targeting errors when relying heavily on automated data analysis.

In 2024, the U.S. military trained artificial intelligence to identify airstrike targets during its operations in Iraq and Syria.

In 2025 India–Pakistan conflict, the Indian Army employed AI to create a shared operational picture, analyze intelligence, evaluate threats, and create predictive models for long-range attacks. Twenty-three applications were developed for different purposes that handled inputs and data for real-time multi-sensor and multi-source data fusion. Applications include the Electronic Intelligence Collation and Analysis System, which has been integrated with Project Sanjay to provide a common operational picture for improved coordination, situational awareness, and decision superiority, and the Trinetra system, which has been used to identify and prioritize critical threats in order to achieve strategic dominance. AI-enabled weather forecast, allowed for accurate planning and targeting of artillery units and long-range vectors. The battlefield AI model was fed 26 years of data that had recorded and archived the Pakistan Armed Forces' frequency signature and radio emission. This specified which military unit in Pakistan was responsible for each piece of equipment and where it had previously been used. Integrating feeds from sensors, drones, radars, and satellites allowed for the collection of real-time data. All the data, including information on adversary positions, resources, and logistics, were combined and presented to the military commanders for appropriate action.

In June 2026, court filings revealed that a government version of Grok was used within the Pentagon's Maven Smart System during military operations against Iran. According to Chief Digital and Artificial Intelligence Officer Cameron Stanley, the system supported the deployment of more than 2,000 munitions against 2,000 distinct targets within a 96-hour period. The disclosure was first reported by The Information. Separate reporting in 2026 also indicated that Anthropic’s Claude was used in U.S. military operations in Iran, particularly in intelligence analysis and in assisting with target identification and prioritization.

== Global trends ==
The development of artificial intelligence for military application have become of significant strategic competition among various countries, researching and deploying AI military applications, in what has been termed the "artificial intelligence arms race". Ongoing research is focused on intelligence collection and analysis, logistics, cyber operations, information operations, and semiautonomous and autonomous vehicles. Countries like the United States, China, and Russia highlight the potential implications for the military competition and international security. ￼

Worldwide annual military spending on robotics rose from US$5.1 billion in 2010 to US$7.5 billion in 2015.

In November 2023, US Vice President Kamala Harris disclosed a declaration signed by 31 nations to set guardrails for the military use of AI. The commitments include using legal reviews to ensure the compliance of military AI with international laws, and being cautious and transparent in the development of this technology. In addition, AI-assisted aircraft and autonomous vehicles that are capable of performing tasks with limited human intervention providing efficiency and convenience. The U.S. Army developed research project Army Intelligence of Maneuver and Mobility which explores the full awareness that these vehicles possess as well as measure the capacity of performance involving different environments.

The U.S. Department of Defense has also developed Project Maven, an automated system that combines digital learning and computer analysis to examine imagery through military surveillance systems. This project helps provide updated visual information to obtain their military objective.

China is another major power that has invested heavily in the development of artificial intelligence to its military agenda.

Some analysts have noted that some military applications of artificial intelligence could pose challenges to and may eventually degrade the Chinese Communist Party's absolute control of the military.

== In popular culture ==
Military artificial intelligence systems have appeared in many works of fiction, often as antagonists.

=== Film ===
- The Terminator franchise
- The Matrix franchise

=== Literature ===
- Legends of Dune trilogy by Brian Herbert

== See also ==
- Group of Governmental Experts on Lethal Autonomous Weapons Systems
- Use of artificial intelligence by the United States Department of Defense
- Artificial intelligence arms race
