= Campaign to Stop Killer Robots =

Coalition of organizations

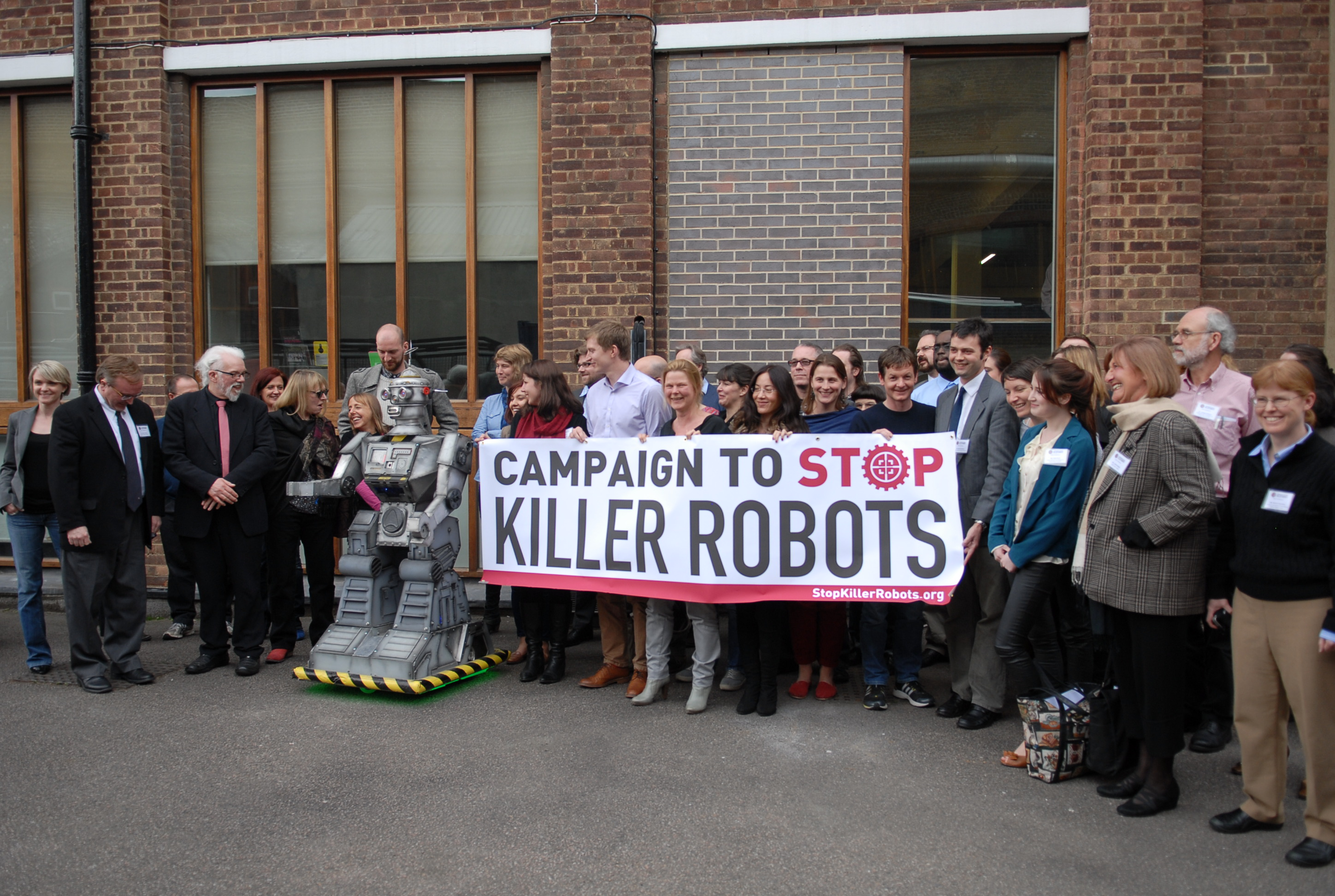
The Campaign to Stop Killer Robots launched in London in April 2013.

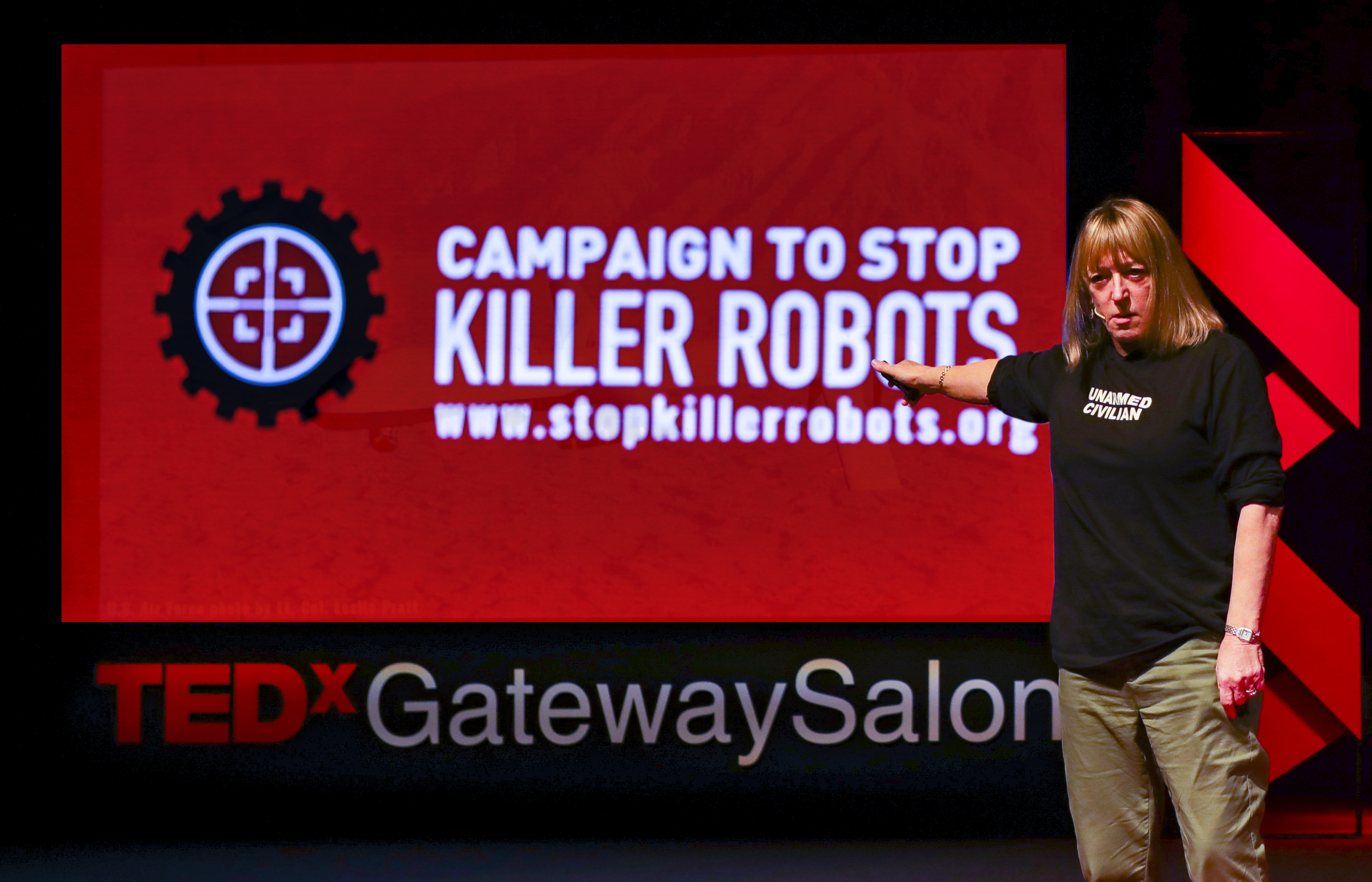
J Williams is a renowned American activist (Nobel Peace Prize in 1997 for her work toward the banning and clearing of anti-personnel mines). On TedX she calls here for a preventive and total ban on lethal autonomous weapons systems (LAWS)

The Campaign to Stop Killer Robots is a coalition of non-governmental organizations who seek to pre-emptively ban lethal autonomous weapons.

== History ==
First launched in April 2013, the Campaign to Stop Killer Robots has urged governments and the United Nations to issue policy to outlaw the development of lethal autonomous weapons systems, also known as LAWS. Several countries including Israel, Russia, South Korea, the United States, and the United Kingdom oppose the call for a pre-emptive ban, and believe that existing international humanitarian law is sufficient regulation for this area.

In December 2018, a global Ipsos poll quantified growing public opposition to fully autonomous weapons. It found that 61% of adults surveyed across 26 countries oppose the use of lethal autonomous weapons systems. Two-thirds of those opposed thought these weapons would "cross a moral line because machines should not be allowed to kill," and more than half said the weapons would be "unaccountable." A similar study across 23 countries was conducted in January 2017, which showed 56% of respondents were opposed to the use of these weapons.

In November 2018, the United Nations Secretary-General António Guterres called for a ban on killer robots, stating, "For me there is a message that is very clear – machines that have the power and the discretion to take human lives are politically unacceptable, are morally repugnant, and should be banned by international law."

In July 2018, over 200 technology companies and 3,000 individuals signed a public pledge to "not participate nor support the development, manufacture, trade, or use of lethal autonomous weapons." In July 2015, over 1,000 experts in artificial intelligence signed on to a letter warning of the threat of an arms race in military artificial intelligence and calling for a ban on autonomous weapons. The letter was presented in Buenos Aires at the 24th International Joint Conference on Artificial Intelligence (IJCAI-15) and was co-signed by Stephen Hawking, Elon Musk, Steve Wozniak, Noam Chomsky, Skype co-founder Jaan Tallinn and Google DeepMind co-founder Demis Hassabis, among others.

In June 2018, Kate Conger, then a journalist for Gizmodo and now with the New York Times, revealed Google's involvement in Project Maven, a US Department of Defense-funded program that sought to autonomously process video footage shot by surveillance drones. Several Google employees resigned over the project, and 4,000 other employees sent a letter to Sundar Pichai, the company's chief executive, protesting Google's involvement in the project and demanding that Google not "build warfare technology." Facing internal pressure and public scrutiny, Google released a set of Ethical Principles for AI which included a pledge to not develop artificial intelligence for use in weapons and promised not to renew the Maven contract after it expires in 2019.

The campaign won the Ypres Peace Prize in 2020 and was nominated for the 2021 Nobel Peace Prize by Norwegian MP Audun Lysbakken. In 2024, the campaign received the Archivio Disarmo – Golden Doves for Peace award.

Stop Killer Robots are due to release a documentary called Immoral Code in May 2022 on the subject of automation and killer robots. The film is due to premiere at Prince Charles Cinema in London's Leicester Square.

== Steering committee members ==
The full membership list of the Campaign to Stop Killer Robots is available on their website.

- Amnesty International
- Handicap International
- Human Rights Watch
- International Committee for Robot Arms Control
- Nobel Women's Initiative
- Pax Christi International
- Pugwash Conferences on Science and World Affairs
- Women's International League for Peace and Freedom

== Countries calling for a prohibition on fully autonomous weapons ==
1. Pakistan on 30 May 2013
2. Ecuador on 13 May 2014
3. Egypt on 13 May 2014
4. Holy See on 13 May 2014
5. Cuba on 16 May 2014
6. Ghana on 16 April 2015
7. Bolivia on 17 April 2015
8. State of Palestine on 13 November 2015
9. Zimbabwe on 12 November 2015
10. Algeria on 11 April 2016
11. Costa Rica on 11 April 2016
12. Mexico on 13 April 2016
13. Chile on 14 April 2016
14. Nicaragua on 14 April 2016
15. Panama on 12 December 2016
16. Peru on 12 December 2016
17. Argentina on 12 December 2016
18. Venezuela on 13 December 2016
19. Guatemala on 13 December 2016
20. Brazil on 13 November 2017
21. Iraq on 13 November 2017
22. Uganda on 17 November 2017
23. Austria on 9 April 2018
24. Djibouti on 13 April 2018
25. Colombia on 13 April 2018
26. El Salvador on 22 November 2018
27. Morocco on 22 November 2018

By 2023, more than 70 states had called for new international law to address lethal autonomous weapons systems, with over 30 explicitly supporting a legally binding prohibition. Austria has been among the most consistently vocal states, submitting working papers to the CCW GGE in 2023 calling for treaty-level regulation. In October 2023, UN Secretary-General António Guterres and ICRC President Mirjana Spoljaric jointly called for states to launch negotiations on a new legally binding instrument on autonomous weapons systems, urging conclusion of a treaty by the end of 2026. On 2 December 2024, the United Nations General Assembly adopted a resolution on lethal autonomous weapons systems with 166 votes in favour, 3 against (Belarus, the Democratic People's Republic of Korea, and the Russian Federation), and 15 abstentions, reflecting broad international consensus on the need for regulation.

== International regulation ==
Under the framework of the Convention on Certain Conventional Weapons, states have discussed lethal autonomous weapon systems since 2014. In 2016, the treaty's states parties established an open-ended Group of Governmental Experts on Lethal Autonomous Weapons Systems to continue those discussions. The discussions have addressed international humanitarian law, accountability, possible prohibitions and regulations, and the extent of human control required over AI-enabled weapons. During the first session in 2026, Stop Killer Robots emphasized the need to preserve meaningful human judgment and control over increasingly autonomous systems.

== See also ==
- The Truth About Killer Robots (2018 documentary)
