= ICRAC =

ICRAC may refer to:

- International Committee for Robot Arms Control
- calcium release‐activated calcium current (I_{crac}), see Calcium release activated channel
