= CoMotion =

The CoMotion platform is a commercial product from General Dynamics C4 Systems that provides a synchronous and asynchronous collaborative workspace enabling data sharing, data visualization, and messaging. It allows potentially hundreds of users to collaborate live, sharing all or part of their persistent workspace and all data contained therein. It is the core platform for the Army's Command Post of the Future, USTRANSCOM's TransViz software, and Array BioPharma's Discovery product. CoMotion builds substantially on earlier work developed at Carnegie Mellon University, MAYA Design Inc., and DARPA.

Data visualization in software often uses a selected Model (as in Model–View–Controller) to organize the information. CoMotion treats the model and the view as data, so that the underlying information can be seen through different models or different views simultaneously. In CoMotion jargon this is known as a "blueprint" of how a visualization is seen. The "frame", or view, can be shared amongst different users of the software. Even with the same underlying information, it's possible for two users to interact around different blueprints or different frames.

All data is stored in "u-forms", which are a universal property list (name-value pairs) that can contain basic types, arrays, and links to other u-forms. This directed graph of u-forms forms the basis for all data in the system, including visualized data, blueprints, as well as the frame locations and clipping states.

Until the commercialization of CoMotion, no enterprise software products existed that allowed for this interaction. Prior, all systems either collaborated on the data itself, or only on the view of that data.

A session describing of CoMotion, its Java underpinnings, and the unique nature of its workspace's UI-data connections was submitted as a paper to Sun Microsystems' 2008 JavaOne conference.

== See also ==
- Collaboration
- Collaborative software
