= Lethal autonomous weapon =

Autonomous military technology system

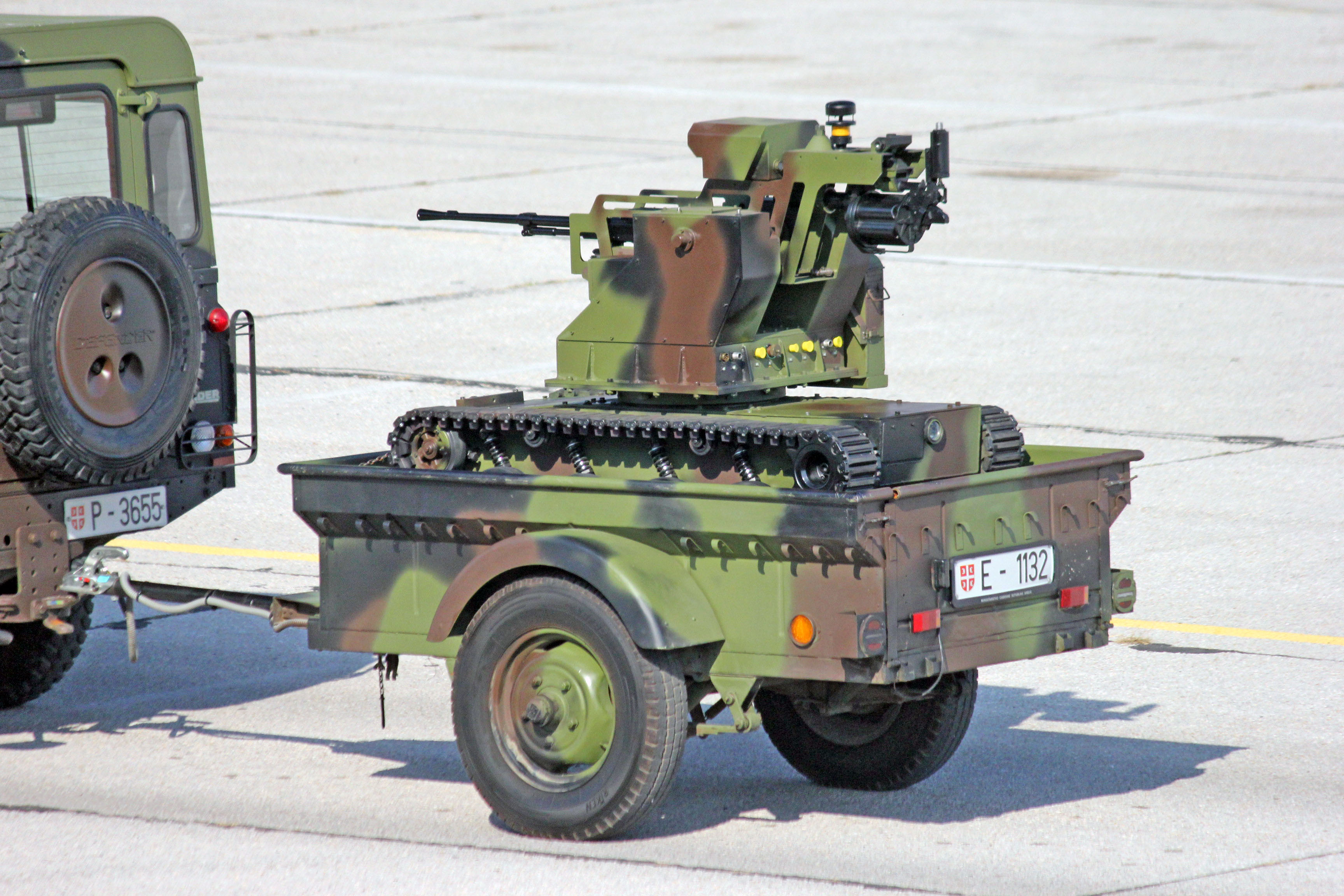
Serbian Land Rover Defender towing trailer with "Miloš" tracked combat robot

In general terms, lethal autonomous weapons systems (LAWS), also known as autonomous weapons systems (AWS), are types of military drones or military robots, that can independently search for and engage targets based on programmed constraints and descriptions. AWS can take several forms, such as Unmanned Aerial Vehicles (UAV), Unmanned Underwater Vehicles (UUV) and Unmanned Ground Vehicles (UGV). However, the majority of alleged AWS are, at the moment, UAVs.

As of 2025, most military drones (including unmanned aerial vehicles and unmanned combat aerial vehicles) and military robots are not truly autonomous, as they still require human control.

== Definitions ==
In weapons development, the term "autonomous" is ambiguous and can vary substantially between different scholars, nations and organizations. There is no definition of lethal autonomous weapon systems that is generally agreed upon among different countries. However, the United Nations Group of Governmental Experts on Lethal Autonomous Weapons Systems made substantial progress towards an agreement in its September 2026 meeting.

Some of the definitional problems are described in the UN Secretary-General's report to the General assembly. For instance, the meaning of "autonomous" is greatly disputed as varying degrees of autonomy exist, within existing systems that are commonly considered autonomous. The International Committee of the Red Cross (ICRC) states that autonomous weapons are weapons which can fully autonomously track, target and engage without needing Human Control. Similarly, some observers argue that the word "lethal" should not be used when discussing these advanced weapons because lethality is "an effect of the manner in which a weapon is used", and not a necessarily innate quality of the weapon."

On another hand, the official United States Department of Defense Policy on Autonomy in Weapon Systems (Department of Defense Directive 3000.09) defines an Autonomous Weapon System as one, that after activation, can select and engage targets without further intervention by a human operator, similarly to the ICRC. Heather Roff, a writer for Case Western Reserve University School of Law, describes autonomous weapon systems as those "capable of learning and adapting their 'functioning in response to changing circumstances in the environment in which [they are] deployed,' as well as capable of making firing decisions on their own."

As mentioned previously, the GGE made progress towards defining LAWS in its September 2026 meeting, agreeing in point III.A.25 of its report that "a lethal autonomous weapon system can be characterized as a combination of one or more weapons and technological components that, operating together, can identify, select, and engage a target with force, without intervention by a human being operating the system."

The United States Department of Defense (DoD) definition of an AWS is argued to be more extensive than the GGE's one as the directive stipulates that its definition includes, but is not limited to, operator-supervised AWS that are designed to allow operators to override operations, but can still select and engage targets without further operator input after activation.

The British Ministry of Defence states "Whilst definitions can vary, the key difference is that an automated system is capable of carrying out complicated tasks but is incapable of complex decision-making, whereas an autonomous system is capable of deciding a course of action without depending on human oversight and control." Some nations (such as France) take a restrictive view of what autonomy consists of, defining an AWS "as a fully autonomous' weapon system, 'capable of changing its own rules of operation, particularly as regards target engagement beyond a determined framework of use'". On the other hand, scholars such as Peter Asaro and Mark Gubrud believe that any weapon system capable of releasing a lethal force without the operation, decision, or confirmation of a human supervisor can be deemed autonomous.

Nevertheless, a wide array of nations and NGOs, such as the US Department of Defense, the International Committee of the Red Cross, Human Rights Watch, or even Stop Killer Robots agree that the essential quality of AWS is that they, "once activated, are capable of selecting and engaging targets without contemporaneous human input".AWS should not be confused with AI Decision Support Systems (AI-DISS), which are a separate category of automated military systems. An AWS applies force to targets, whereas "AI-DSS systems . . . use AI techniques to collect and analyze data, provide information about the operational environment, as well as actionable recommendations . . ."

The meaning of autonomy, in the context of weapons, has been blurred in recent years by virtue of some commentators using it interchangeably with Artificial intelligence (AI). One observer noted that "reliance on remotely piloted capabilities, uncrewed vehicles, and loitering munitions, with ever-increasing degrees of autonomy (AI enabled or not) . . . are further blurring the lines between AI, autonomy, and military systems . . ."

== Automatic defensive systems ==
Some definitions of autonomous weapon systems are broad enough to include land mines and naval mines which are simple automatically-triggered lethal weapons which have been in use for centuries.

Some current examples of LAWs are automated "hardkill" active protection systems, such as a radar-guided close-in weapon systems (CIWS) used to defend ships that have been in use since the 1970s (e.g., the US Phalanx CIWS). Such systems can autonomously identify and attack oncoming missiles, rockets, artillery fire, aircraft, and surface vessels according to criteria set by the human operator.

Similar systems exist for tanks, such as the Russian Arena, the Israeli Trophy, and the German AMAP-ADS. Several types of stationary sentry guns, which can fire at humans and vehicles, are used in South Korea and Israel. Many missile defence systems, such as Iron Dome, also have autonomous targeting capabilities.

The need for rapid response has been preventing a "human in the loop" in these systems, as they have been used to protect personnel and installations against incoming projectiles.

== Autonomous offensive systems ==
According to The Economist in 2018, as technology advances, applications of uncrewed undersea vehicles could include mine clearance, mine-laying, anti-submarine sensor networking in contested waters, patrolling with active sonar, resupplying manned submarines, and becoming low-cost missile platforms.

In 2017 the Russian Federation was developing artificially intelligent missiles, drones, unmanned vehicles, military robots and medic robots. Israeli Minister Ayoob Kara stated in 2017 that Israel is developing military robots, including ones as small as flies.

In 2018, the U.S. Nuclear Posture Review alleged that Russia was developing a "new intercontinental, nuclear-armed, nuclear-powered, undersea autonomous torpedo" named "Status 6".

In October 2018, Zeng Yi, a senior executive at the Chinese defense firm Norinco, gave a speech in which he said that "In future battlegrounds, there will be no people fighting": the use of LAWS being "inevitable". An interesting statement as China was criticised for selling, in 2019, drones capable of engaging targets without human oversight.

As of 2020, DARPA was working on making swarms of 250 lethal UAVs available to the American military. Similarly, the US Navy is developing unmanned surface vehicles, also called sea drones, including Ghost Fleet Overlord, with plans to equip them with weapons. They have the potential to be semi-autonomous.

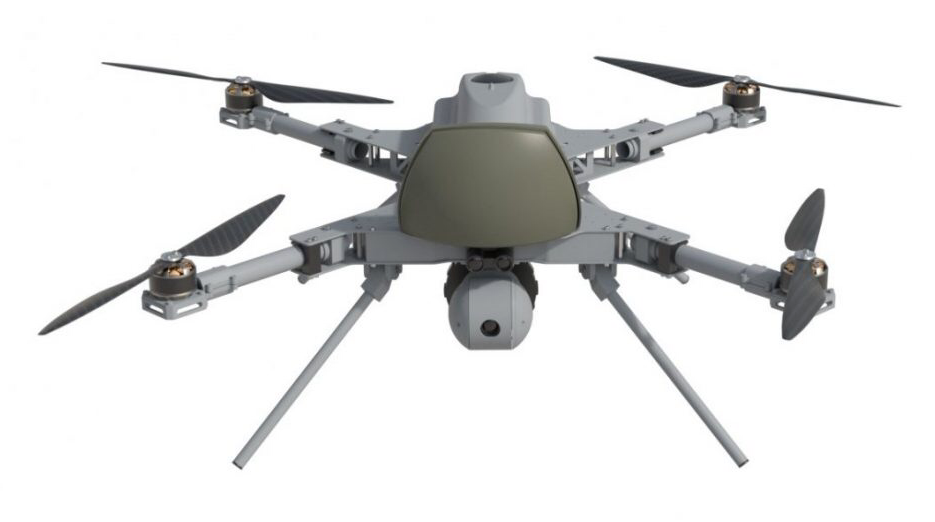
The Turkish STM Kargu loitering munition may have been the first lethal autonomous weapon to attack enemy combatants in warfare.

Additionally, in 2020 a Kargu 2 drone hunted down and attacked a human target in Libya, according to a report from the UN Security Council's Panel of Experts on Libya, published in March 2021. This may have been the first time an autonomous killer robot armed with lethal weaponry attacked human beings.

In May 2021, Israel conducted an AI-guided combat drone swarm attack in Gaza.

== Impact of the Russo-Ukrainian war ==
Furthermore, the Russo-Ukrainian war greatly developed the use of UAVs by the military. Indeed, Ukraine has developed advanced UAVs with integrated AI for a range of drone warfare purposes, including the attacks of infrastructures in Russia.

However, as of May 2026, several sources such as Al Jazeera reported that humans remain in control of operation.

In June 2026, a senior figure in the Ukraine defense industry told New Scientist that, two years earlier, "fully autonomous drones with no human oversight" had killed soldiers on the battlefield for the first time. Although it is yet to be proven, the attack involved 10 AI-controlled "Terminator" drones, which were said to have killed "a couple" of Russian soldiers, and to have additionally targeted a Russian tank. A Ukrainian drone-maker described the weapon as follows:

We just launch it and we know everything will be dead – everything that will be found there in this particular area will be dead... There is no connection to the drone at all, you cannot see the video, nothing... Everything it sees will be killed."

Later in 2026, Russia allegedly employed a fully autonomous AWS against Ukrainian, killing three people. However, once again, this is yet to be proven.

One effect of the technology-intensive nature of the Russo-Ukrainian War has been to accelerate U.S. development of LAWS and of AI-based military systems generally.

== Ethical and legal issues ==
=== Degree of human control ===
The increasing use of AWS raises numerous ethical and legal issues. David Kirichenko, for instance, has asserted: “This is the Oppenheimer moment of our generation.” He warns that autonomous UAVs could make mass killing nearly effortless and fears the emergence of an arms race. Backing-up this claim, Kirchenko notes that drones are now responsible for almost 70% of all casualties in the Russo-Ukrainian war.

In a 2012 Human Rights Watch Reports, B. Docherty laid out three degrees of human control in regards to AWS

1. Human-in-the-loop: a human must instigate the action of the weapon (i.e. the weapon is not fully autonomous)
2. Human-on-the-loop: a human supervises the operation, and may abort or override it.
3. Human-out-of-the-loop: no human action is involved, the weapon is fully autonomous.

More recently, the notion of "meaningful human control" (along with “human control," "appropriate human judgment," and "human involvement") has been increasingly used in discussions regarding AWS' limits. Among the retained elements of human control suggested as necessary are:

1. Humans must have sufficient informations, including on the capabilities of the weapons system and the operational context, to ensure compliance with International Humanitarian Law.
2. Humans must have the ability to exercise their judgment to the extent required by International Humanitarian Law.
3. Humans must have the ability to limit the types of tasks and targets.

In its September 3, 2026 Report, the United Nations Group of Governmental Experts on Lethal Autonomous Weapons Systems stated the requirement for human control in point III.A.35:

To uphold compliance with rules of international law applicable in armed conflict, including the principles and requirements of distinction, proportionality and precautions in attack, control and human judgment with regard to LAWS are needed. Human beings exercise such control directly or indirectly, including through measures taken before and/or during the use of LAWS. Regardless of how control is exercised, human beings need to exercise judgement to determine what measures are necessary to ensure compliance with applicable IHL . . .

Furthermore, the ICRC maintains that the use of non-deterministic weapons would be unlawful in that if a weapon cannot predict its own outcome (Nondeterministic algorithm), the commander authorizing its use cannot guarantee the weapon will comply with IHL when it is activated.

=== Standard used in US policy ===
Department of Defense Directive 3000.09 states that "Autonomous … weapons systems shall be designed to allow commanders and operators to exercise appropriate levels of human judgment over the use of force."

However, as noted in the Bulletin of the Atomic Scientists, the policy requires that autonomous weapon systems that kill people or use kinetic force, selecting and engaging targets without further human intervention, be certified as compliant with "appropriate levels" and other standards, not that such weapon systems cannot meet these standards and are therefore forbidden. "Semi-autonomous" hunter-killers that autonomously identify and attack targets do not even require certification. Moreover, ". . . expert analysis suggests that AI-DSS falls outside the directive's scope."

Deputy Defense Secretary Robert O. Work said in 2016 that the Defense Department would "not delegate lethal authority to a machine to make a decision", but might need to reconsider this since "authoritarian regimes" may do so. In October 2016 President Barack Obama stated that early in his career he was wary of a future in which a US president making use of drone warfare could "carry on perpetual wars all over the world, and a lot of them covert, without any accountability or democratic debate". In the US, security-related AI has fallen under the purview of the National Security Commission on Artificial Intelligence since 2018.

On October 31, 2019, the United States Department of Defense's Defense Innovation Board published the draft of a report outlining five principles for weaponized AI and making 12 recommendations for the ethical use of artificial intelligence by the Department of Defense that would ensure a human operator would always be able to look into the Black box and understand the kill-chain process. A major concern is how the report will be implemented, because the U.S. has warmly embraced the use of A.I.-based weapons in recent years. A significant change in U.S. Policy seemed to be in the offing as of 2026 with "Project Agincourt" which has two missions: 1) create a "four-star Autonomous Warfare Command . . . by October 1, 2027, and 2) "continue the mission" of the Direct Reporting Portfolio Manager for Unmanned Systems . . .while pioneering a new acquisition model that pairs autonomous and robotics companies directly with operational forces at the edge."

=== Possible violations of ethics and international law ===
Stuart Russell, professor of computer science from University of California, Berkeley stated the concern he has with LAWs is that his view is that it is unethical and inhumane. The main issue with this system is it is hard to distinguish between combatants and non-combatants. However, improvements in AWS, especially with the use of AI, can ameliorate some of these concerns. Nathan Wood has noted that "there are a host of cases where specific autonomous systems can reliably distinguish between military targets and protected persons and objects, and in some cases already are doing so. However, the greatly increased amount of information acquired via AI and the speed at which it is presented raises questions as to how human judgment can be applied in combat decision making.

There is concern by some economists and legal scholars about whether LAWs would violate International Humanitarian Law, especially the principle of distinction, which requires the ability to discriminate combatants from non-combatants, and the principle of proportionality, which requires that damage to civilians be proportional to the military aim. This concern is often invoked as a reason to ban "killer robots" altogether - but it is doubtful that this concern can be an argument against LAWs that do not violate International Humanitarian Law. Wood has asserted that while it would be wrong to use AWS in some circumstances, in others AWS "are likely to be superior, both morally and legally, to conventional alternatives."

A 2021 report by the American Congressional Research Service states that "there are no domestic or international legal prohibitions on the development of use of LAWs," although it acknowledges ongoing talks at the UN Convention on Certain Conventional Weapons (CCW).

LAWs are said by some to blur the boundaries of who is responsible for a particular killing. Philosopher Robert Sparrow argues that autonomous weapons are causally but not morally responsible, similar to child soldiers. In each case, he argues there is a risk of atrocities occurring without an appropriate subject to hold responsible, which violates jus in bello. Thomas Simpson and Vincent Müller argue that they may make it easier to record who gave which command.

=== Campaigns to ban LAWs ===
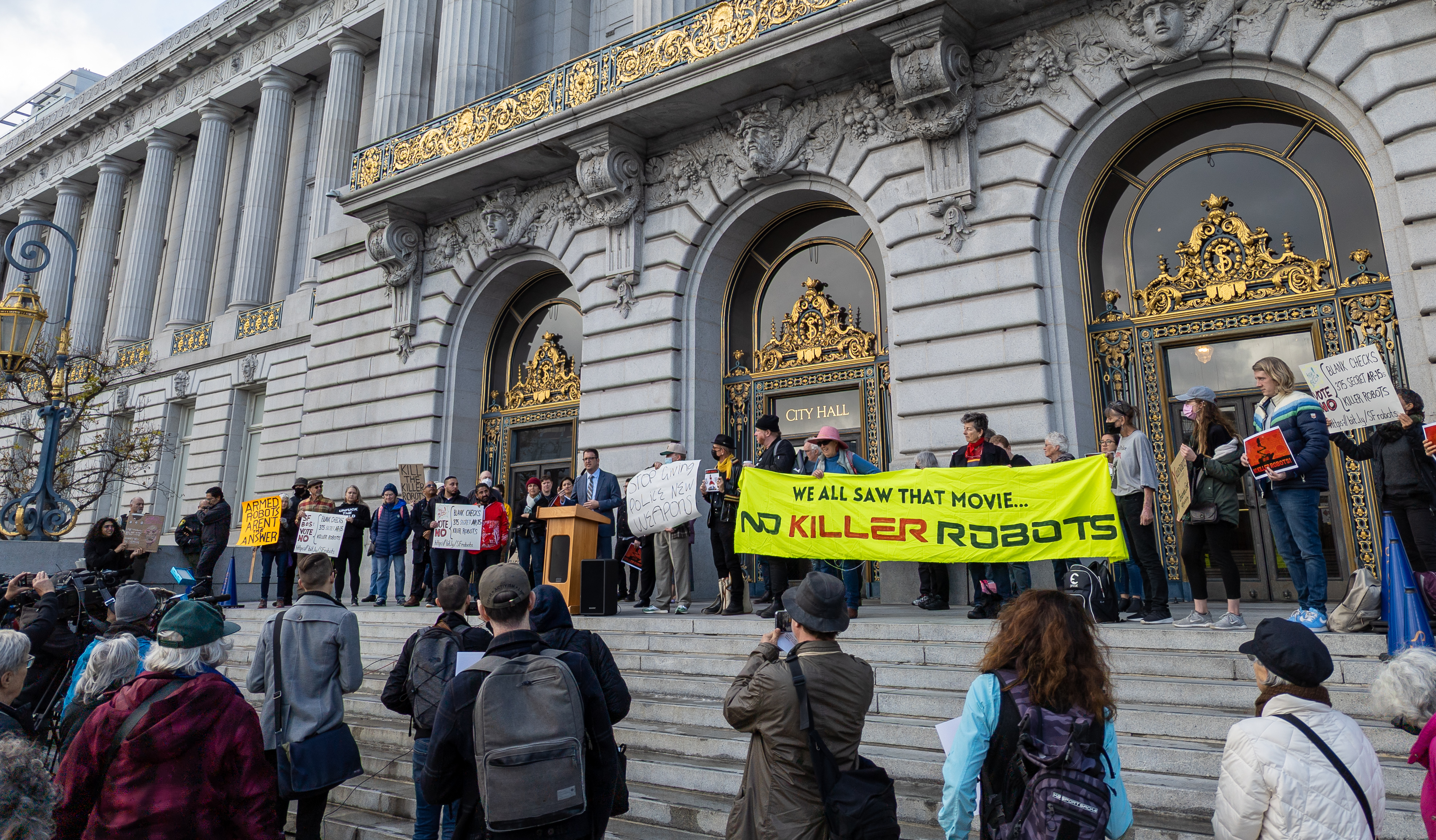
Rally on the steps of San Francisco City Hall, protesting against a vote to authorize police use of deadly force robots

The possibility of LAWs has generated significant debate, especially about the risk of "killer robots" roaming the earth in the near or far future. The group Campaign to Stop Killer Robots formed in 2013. In July 2015, over 1,000 experts in artificial intelligence signed a letter warning of the threat of an artificial intelligence arms race and calling for a ban on autonomous weapons. The letter was presented in Buenos Aires at the 24th International Joint Conference on Artificial Intelligence (IJCAI-15) and was co-signed by Stephen Hawking, Elon Musk, Steve Wozniak, Noam Chomsky, Skype co-founder Jaan Tallinn and Google DeepMind co-founder Demis Hassabis, among others.

According to PAX For Peace, one of the founding organisations of the Campaign to Stop Killer Robots, fully automated weapons (FAWs) will lower the threshold of going to war as soldiers are removed from the battlefield and the public is distanced from experiencing war, giving politicians and other decision-makers more space in deciding when and how to go to war. They warn that once deployed, FAWs will make democratic control of war more difficult, something that author of Kill Decision (a novel on the topic) and IT specialist Daniel Suarez also warned about: according to him it might recentralize power into very few hands by requiring very few people to go to war.

Persons protesting the development of LAWS have created websites aimed at publicizing what they view as the undesirable effects of research into the application of artificial intelligence to weapons design. On these websites, news about ethical and legal issues are constantly updated for visitors to recap with recent news about international meetings and research articles concerning LAWs. In December 2022, a vote of the San Francisco Board of Supervisors to authorize San Francisco Police Department use of LAWs drew national attention and protests. The Board reversed this vote in a subsequent meeting.

The Holy See has called for the international community to ban the use of LAWs on several occasions. In November 2018, Archbishop Ivan Jurkovic, the permanent observer of the Holy See to the United Nations, stated that "In order to prevent an arms race and the increase of inequalities and instability, it is an imperative duty to act promptly: now is the time to prevent LAWs from becoming the reality of tomorrow’s warfare." The Church has expressed concern that these weapons systems have the capability to irreversibly alter the nature of warfare, create detachment from human agency and put in question the humanity of societies. However, the Holy See’s call for a ban on lethal autonomous weapons refers only to those weapons whose critical functions, such as target selection and engagement, are under the machine’s control instead of a human being’s. In the Holy See’s view “a machine can be thus considered as under ‘significant human control’ or MHC [Meaningful Human Control] if: (1) there is a degree human supervision at least capable of calling off a particular sortie; (2) all courses of action are ‘well known’ to the operator; (3) the environment is 'perfectly circumscribed and known." Apostolic Nuncio Ettore Balestrero reiterated the Holy See's position on LAWS in 2024.

As of 29 March 2019, the majority of governments represented at a UN meeting to discuss the matter favoured a ban on LAWs. A minority of governments, including those of Australia, Israel, Russia, the UK, and the US, opposed a ban. The United States has stated that autonomous weapons have helped prevent the killing of civilians.

A summit of 60 countries was held in 2023 on the responsible use of AI in the military. On 22 December 2023, a United Nations General Assembly resolution was adopted to support international discussion regarding concerns about LAWS. The vote was 152 in favor, four against, and 11 abstentions.

=== Regulation without banning ===
Another approach focuses on regulating the use of autonomous weapon systems in lieu of a ban. Military AI arms control will likely require the institutionalization of new international norms embodied in effective technical specifications combined with active monitoring and informal ('Track II') diplomacy by communities of experts, together with a legal and political verification process. According to Gregory C. Allen, a former Pentagon AI official, the United States Department of Defense requested a dialogue with the Chinese People's Liberation Army on safety and risk reduction related to AI-enabled autonomous weapons in 2021 but was refused.

Under the framework of the Convention on Certain Conventional Weapons, states have discussed lethal autonomous weapon systems since 2014. In 2016, the treaty's states parties established an open-ended Group of Governmental Experts on Lethal Autonomous Weapons Systems to continue those discussions. The discussions have addressed international humanitarian law, accountability, possible prohibitions and regulations, and the extent of human control required over AI-enabled weapons. As of its final meeting in September of 2026, the GGE had, in accordance with its mandate, reached a consensus on twenty-three points and formulated, by consensus, "a set of elements of an instrument, without prejudging its nature, and other possible measures to address emerging technologies in the area of lethal autonomous weapon systems . . . " It has been suggested that there are three approaches to creating a legally binding instrument governing LAWS: 1) the prohibition of particular types of autonomous weapons (such as those targeting humans); 2) imposing obligations regarding AW use (such as requiring meaningful human control); and 3) mandating due diligence requirements in the use of autonomous weapons.

Concerns about the ability of humans to control AI systems, including AI-based LAWS, even if they are "in the loop," were heightened by the OpenAI rogue agent breach of Hugging Face and other Artificial intelligence controversies of 2026. The AI company Anthropic warned in its pre-IPO disclosure documents of October 2026, that "[as] AI systems 'become more autonomous and capable of taking consequential actions with less human oversight . . . there is a risk that such systems could take harmful actions independently and at scale without human intervention.'"

== See also ==
- Artificial intelligence
- Artificial intelligence arms race
- Artificial intelligence controversies
- List of fictional military robots
- Military applications of artificial intelligence
- OpenAI rogue agent breach of Hugging Face
- Slaughterbots
