= Course of Action Display and Evaluation Tool =

Military planning system

Course of Action Display and Evaluation Tool (CADET) was a research program, and the eponymous prototype software system, that applied knowledge-based techniques of Artificial Intelligence to the problem of battle planning. CADET was also known as Course of Action Display and Elaboration Tool. It was considered an early example of such systems and was funded by the United States Army and by the Defense Advanced Research Projects Agency (DARPA). CADET influenced a later DARPA program called RAID which in turn produced a technology adopted by the United States Army and the United States Marine Corps.

== History ==
The development of Course of Action Display and Evaluation Tool (CADET) began in 1996, at the Carnegie Group, Inc., Pittsburgh PA, funded under the Small Business Innovation Research (SBIR) program. The goal of the first phase SBIR project was to produce “...a live storyboard of [Course of Action] COA development, wargaming, animation, and assessment.”

In 1997, the United States Army awarded the Carnegie Group Inc. $750K for SBIR Phase II. The intent was to develop “...a war-gaming modeling and analysis Decision Support System (DSS), … CADET will consist of a combination of Knowledge-Based and decision analytic tools and technologies to provide fast nimble COA war-gaming modeling, simulation, and animation under direct control of the commander and staff. ...Phase II will result in an operations prototype (OP) suitable for use and evaluation in field exercises.”

In 2000, CADET was integrated and experimentally evaluated within the framework of the Integrated Course of Action Critiquing and Elaboration System (ICCES) experiment, conducted by the Battle Command Battle Laboratory – Leavenworth (BCBL-L) within the program Concept Experimentation Program (CEP) sponsored by TRADOC.

In 2000-2002, DARPA applied CADET in the program titled Command Post of the Future (CPoF) as a tool to generate a course of action. Under the umbrella of the CPoF program, CADET was integrated with the FOX GA system to provide a detailed planner, coupled with COA generation capability. In the same period, Battle Command Battle Lab-Huachuca (BCBL-H) performed an integration CADET with the system called All Source Analysis System-Light (ASAS-L); here CADET was intended to generate plans for intelligence assets, and conduct wargames of different COAs, enemy versus friendly.

From 1996 through 2002, work on CADET was performed by the Carnegie Group, Inc., and supported by funding from the US Army CECOM (CADET SBIR Phase I, CADET SBIR Phase II and CADET Enhancements); DARPA (Command Post of the Future); and TRADOC BCBL-H.

== Operation ==
CADET was intended to be used by the staff of the United States Army Brigade, within the Military Decision Making Process (MDMP). In particular, CADET helped produce, automatically or semi-automatically, the products generated within the step of MDMP called Course of Action (COA) Development and the following step of MDMP called COA Analysis and Wargaming.

CADET software resided on a laptop computer. Using the computer, the staff officers entered the input to CADET, or alternatively this input arrived at CADET from upstream computer systems. The input consisted of:

1. Order of Battle, i.e., the units constituting the friendly brigade and the enemy units participating in the battle, and their various characteristics;
2. primary activities of the Course of Action, where each activity is typically linked to one or more geographic areas or a route, and sometimes to a major unit executing the activity;
3. digital map of the region where the battle was to take place, including the digital description of significant features such as locations of friendly and enemy units, roads, assembly areas, objectives, and axes of attacks.

Taking this input, CADET automatically performed the following tasks (not sequentially):

- Planning and scheduling the low-level tasks necessary for a given COA
- Allocating tasks to various units and assets constituting the brigade
- Assigning suitable locations and routes
- Estimating the battle losses (attrition) of friendly and enemy forces, and consumption of resources (e.g., fuel and ammunition)
- Predicting enemy actions or reactions.

CADET produced the following outputs:

1. Synchronization matrix, directly editable and printable; synchronization matrix is a kind of Gantt chart that shows assignments of activities to units, to locations/routes and to time periods
2. Map overlays in PPT or JPG formats
3. Animation output
4. XML formally-encoded plan
5. Textual Operation Plan (OPLAN) draft
6. E-mail messages with attachments: XML and text versions of OPLAN

== Design ==
The core algorithm is a planning algorithm where CADET uses a knowledge-based approach of the hierarchical-task-network type. Each task class is associated with a model of more detailed subtasks that should be performed in order to accomplish the higher-level task. Algorithms selected (heuristically) a task and then decomposes it into subtasks.

Although similar to hierarchical-task-network planning algorithm, CADET’s algorithm includes elements of adversarial reasoning. After adding a subtask, the algorithm uses rules to determine the enemy’s probable actions and reactions as well as friendly counteractions This approximated the action-reaction-counteraction technique of manual wargaming used by the United States Army.

When a task involves movements of a unit, the algorithm performs routing, i.e., finds a route for the movement that minimizes the time required for the movement as well as exposure to the enemy attacks.

Each added tasks (subtask) normally requires a unit which would execute the task, and a time period when the task would be executed. Therefore, when a certain number of subtasks is added by the planning process, the algorithm also performs the allocation of the newly added subtasks to units and to time periods (i.e., scheduling). allocation and scheduling of tasks relies on both domain-specific and constraint-guided heuristics.

A tasks may also require expenditures of fuel and ammunition. If the tasks involves engagement with the enemy, the performing units will experience lossesof personnel and weapon systems (attrition). CADET’s algorithm includes estimates of consumption of different types of consumables, and also attrition. Depending on the degree of attrition and consumption, CADET adds tasks that are needed to refuel or reconstitute the units.

The algorithm continually interleaves incremental steps of planning, routing, scheduling, and attrition and consumption estimates.

== Evaluation ==
Two evaluation experiments are described in literature. The first experiment called ICCES took three days. The subjects were Army officers from combat arms branches, with 11 to 23 years of active service, in the ranks of majors and lieutenant colonels, a total of 8. Each officer was given 4 hours of training learning to operate CADET and related computer tools. Officers were divided into two groups and given a tactical scenario. One group (the control group) used the traditional, manual process; the other used the system called ICCES, the automated core of which was CADET. Each group produced three COA sketches and statements and one COA synchronization matrix. Then, the experiment was repeated with another scenario but the control group became the automated group and vice versa. The users were generally satisfied with the quality of the ICCES-generated products. The group using ICCES made only a few changes to the product that was automatically generated, indicating that they agreed with the majority of the plan that ICCES produced.

The second experiment was reminiscent of Turing test. The experiment involved one user, nine judges (active-duty officers, mainly colonels and lieutenant colonels), and five scenarios obtained from several US Army exercises. For each scenario, experimenters obtained synchronization matrices that were produced in earlier exercises, typically by a team of four to five officers in three to four hours, spending approximately 16 person-hours in total. Using these scenarios and COAs, the user had CADET generate automatically detailed plans and express them as synchronization matrices. The user, a retired US Army officer, reviewed and slightly edited the matrices. The entire process took less than two minutes of computations by and approximately 20 minutes of review and post-editing, approximately 0.4 person-hour in total per product. The experimenters gave the resulting matrices the same visual style as those produced by humans. The judges, who did not know whether a planning product was a traditional product of humans, or with computerized aids, were asked to grade the products. The result was that the average grades for manual products and CADET-generated products were statistically indistinguishable, even though CADET-generated products required far less time to produce.

== Legacy ==
CADET served as “...an example of how even relatively basic AI systems can potentially affect the implementation of IHL during the military decision-making process.”

In early 2000s, CADET influenced the DARPA RAID program (started 2004). The RAID program in turn produced a technology adopted by the Army and the United States Marine Corps.

== Criticisms ==
It was argued that in the CADET approach “...the decision-making of the process is obscured, and unaccountable,” and optimality of the planning process is traded for speed.
