= Lucy Suchman =

British sociologist

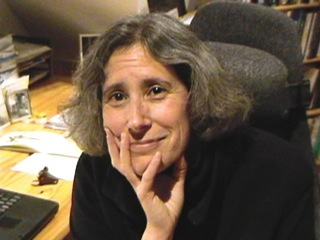
- Lucy Suchman
- Born: 1951 (age 74–75); Ithaca, New York
- Occupations: Professor, anthropologist
- Employer: Lancaster University
- Known for: Human–computer interaction
- Website: www.lancaster.ac.uk/humanities-arts-and-social-sciences/people/lucy-suchman

Lucy Suchman (born 1951) is an American anthropologist who studies human-computer interaction. She is professor emerita of Anthropology of Science and Technology in the Department of Sociology at Lancaster University, in the United Kingdom, also known for her work at Xerox PARC in the 1980s and 90s.

== Career ==
Before coming to Lancaster, she worked for 22 years at Xerox's Palo Alto Research Center (PARC) in California, where she held the positions of principal scientist and manager of the Work Practice and Technology research group. While at PARC, she conducted an influential ethnographic study, using video, of office workers and research scientists struggling to use a copy machine.

Suchman is a graduate of the University of California, Berkeley, obtaining her BA in 1972, MA in 1977, and Doctorate in Social and Cultural Anthropology in 1984. While at Berkeley, she wrote her dissertation critiquing the AI planning model as a basis for interactive interface design. She also studied procedural office work to understand how it was similar to and different from a program, and how assumptions about the work informed the design of information systems.

== Research ==
Suchman's early research was heavily influenced by ethnomethodology. Suchman's book, Plans and Situated Actions: The Problem of Human-machine Communication (1987), provided intellectual foundations for the field of human-computer interaction (HCI). She challenged common assumptions behind the design of interactive systems with a cogent anthropological argument that human action is constantly constructed and reconstructed from dynamic interactions with the material and social worlds. She has made fundamental contributions to ethnographic analysis, conversational analysis and Participatory Design techniques for the development of interactive computer systems.

An updated version of the book was published in 2007. This second edition, called Human-Machine Reconfigurations, included five new chapters exploring developments in the field of computing and social studies of technology since the mid-1980s. Specifically, Suchman addressed the relationship and interactions between humans and machines with a focus on the idea of human-like machines. Her later research is dedicated to problems of autonomy and control in human-technology interaction with emphasis on autonomous weapon systems.

Her current research extends her longstanding critical engagement with the field of human-computer interaction to the domain of contemporary war fighting, including problems of ‘situational awareness’ in military training and simulation, and in the design and deployment of automated weapon systems. At the center of this research is the question of whose bodies are incorporated into military systems, how and with what consequences for social justice and the possibility for a less violent world. Suchman is a member of International Committee for Robot Arms Control and the author of the blog dedicated to the problems of ethical robotics and 'technocultures of humanlike machines'.

== Professional affiliations ==
In 1988, Suchman served as the program chair for the Second Conference on Computer-Supported Cooperative Work. She also served as the Program Chair for the first Conference on Participatory Design of Computer Systems. Between 1982 and 1990, Suchman was on the board of directors of the Computer Professionals for Social Responsibility, a group she helped to form. Suchman is currently a member of the International Committee for Robot Arms Control. In addition, she serves as a Collaborating Editor for Social Studies of Science.

Suchman is also affiliated with numerous academic institutions. She served as president of the Society for Social Studies of Science from 2016 to 2017. She has served as a visiting senior research fellow with King's College London's Work, Interaction and Technology Research Group and as an adjunct professor for the Interaction Design and Work Practice Laboratory at Sydney's University of Technology. Suchman also served as an adjunct professor at the IT University of Copenhagen in Denmark.

== Awards ==
- 1988 Xerox Corporate Research Group's Excellence in Science and Technology Award
- 2002 Benjamin Franklin Medal in Computer and Cognitive Science
- 2005 Outstanding Contribution to Research Award from the Communication and Information Technologies Section of the American Sociological Association
- 2010 Lifetime Research Award from the Association for Computing Machinery (ACM) Special Interest Group on Computer-Human Interaction
- 2011 Honorary Doctorate at Malmö University.
- 2014 John Desmond Bernal Prize from the Society for Social Studies of Science.
- 2018 Honorary Doctorate at Maastricht University.

== Publications ==
- Suchman, L. (1987) Plans and situated actions : The Problem of Human-Machine Communication. Cambridge University Press, New York.
- Suchman, L. (1993) Response to Vera and Simon's Situated Action: A Symbolic Interpretation. Cognitive Science, 17:71—75, 1993.
- Suchman, L. (1995) Making Work Visible. Communications of the ACM, 38 (9). pp. 56–61+.
- Suchman, L. (1995) Representations of Work (Special Report). Communications of the ACM, 38 (9). pp. 33–68.
- Suchman, L. and Blomberg, J. and Orr, J. E. (1999) Reconstructing Technologies as Social Practice. The American Behavioral Scientist, 43 (3). pp. 392–408.
- Suchman, L. (2000) Embodied Practices of Engineering Work. Mind, Culture and Activity, 7 (1&2). pp. 4–18.
- Suchman, L. (2000) Making a case: knowledge and routine work in document production. In: Workplace studies : recovering work practice and informing system design. Cambridge University Press, Cambridge, pp. 29–45.
- Suchman, L. (2000) Organising alignment : a case of bridge-building. Organization, 7 (2). pp. 311–327.
- Suchman, L. and Bishop, L. (2000) Problematizing 'Innovation' as a Critical Project. Technology Analysis & Strategic Management, 12 (3). pp. 327–333.
- Suchman, L. (2002) Practice-based design of information systems : notes from the hyperdeveloped world. The Information Society, 18 (2). pp. 139–144.
- Suchman, L. A. and Blomberg, J. and Trigg, R. (2002) Working Artefacts: Ethnomethods of the prototype. British Journal of Sociology, 53 (2). pp. 163–179.
- Suchman, L. (2003) Figuring service in discourses of ICT: the case of software agent. In: Global and Organizational Discourses about Information Technology. International Federation for Information Processing . Kluwer, Dordrecht, The Netherlands, pp. 15–32.
- Suchman, L. (2003) Organising alignment. In: Knowing in organisations: a practice-based approach. M. E. Sharpe, London, pp. 187–203.
- Suchman, L. (2004) Decentring the manager/designer. In: Managing as designing. Stanford Business Books, Stanford, pp. 169–73.
- Suchman, L. (2004) Methods and madness. In: First person : new media as story, performance, and game. MIT Press, London, pp. 95–98.
- Suchman, L. (2004) Talking things. In: First person : new media as story, performance, and game. MIT Press, London, pp. 262–265.
- Suchman, L. (2005) Affiliative Objects. Organization, 12 (3). pp. 379–399.
- Suchman, L. (2006) "Wajcman confronts cyberfeminism." Social Studies of Science.
- Suchman, L. (2007) Feminist STS and the Sciences of the Artificial. In: New Handbook of Science and Technology Studies. MIT Press.
- Suchman, L. (2007) Human-Machine Reconfigurations. Cambridge University Press, New York.
- Suchman, L. (2011) Practice and its overflows: Reflections on order and mess. TECNOSCIENZA: Italian Journal of Science & Technology Studies, 2(1):21–30.
- Suchman, L. (2011) Anthropological Relocations and the Limits of Design. Annual Review of Anthropology, 40: 1–18.
- Suchman, L. (2011) Subject Objects. Feminist Theory, 12 (2): 119–145.
- Suchman, L. (2013) Consuming Anthropology. A. Barry & G. Borrn (Eds.), Interdisciplinary: Reconfigurations of the Social and Natural Sciences, (pp. 141–160). London: Routledge.
- Suchman, L. (2015). Situational Awareness: Deadly bioconvergence at the boundaries of bodies and machines Media Tropes, V(1), 1-24.
- Suchman, L. (2016). Configuring the Other: Sensing War through Immersive Simulation. Catalyst: feminism, theory, technoscience, 2(1).
- Suchman, L., & Weber, J. (2016). Human-Machine Autonomies. In N. Bhuta, S. Beck, R. Geis, H.-Y. Liu, & C. Kreis (Eds.), Autonomous Weapons Systems (pp. 75–102). Cambridge, UK: Cambridge University Press.

== See also ==
- Cognition
- Ethnography
- Philosophy of mind
- Science and technology studies
- Science studies

Preceded by Marvin Minsky	Benjamin Franklin Medal in Computer and Cognitive Science; 2002	Succeeded by John McCarthy (computer scientist)
