= International Committee for Robot Arms Control =

Campaign organisation founded in 2009

The International Committee for Robot Arms Control (ICRAC) is a "not-for-profit association committed to the peaceful use of robotics in the service of humanity and the regulation of robot weapons." It is concerned about the dangers that autonomous military robots, or lethal autonomous weapons, pose to peace and international security and to civilians in war.

The international non governmental organisation was founded in 2009 by Noel Sharkey, Jurgen Altmann, Peter M. Asaro, and Robert Sparrow. Sharkey is its chairman. The committee is composed of people involved in robotics technology, robot ethics, international relations, international security, arms control, international humanitarian law, international human rights law, and public campaigns.

Lethal autonomous weapons are being developed that will be able to select and engage targets without human oversight. ICRAC has argued at the United Nations (UN) over the ramifications of such weapons and for them to be banned by including them under the UN Convention on Certain Conventional Weapons (CCW).

ICRAC is on the steering committee of the Campaign to Stop Killer Robots.

== See also ==
- Arms Control Association
- Control Arms Campaign
- Samsung SGR-A1 – autonomous sentry robot gun deployed by South Korea along its border with North Korea
- BAE Systems Taranis – British demonstrator programme for unmanned combat aerial vehicle technology
