= Army Battle Command System =

American digital military system

The Army Battle Command System (ABCS) is a digital Command, Control, Communications, Computers and Intelligence (C4I) system for the US Army. It includes a mix of fixed/semi-fixed and mobile networks. It is also designed for interoperability with US and Coalition C4I systems.

Army Battle Command System (ABCS) Version 6.4 is an integrated suite that allows troops to obtain an automated view of friendly activity and supply movement; plan fires, receive situation and intelligence reports, view the airspace and receive automatically disseminated weather reports.

== Systems ==
ABCS is intended to function as a System of systems concept, with the ultimate goal of being similar to what the internet provides to civilians. Similar to how those using the internet have no need to know the location of the network they connect to, ABCS is intended to provide the same capability. In this way, the ABCS system will allow commanders to see multiple systems on one screen and easily transfer data from one to the next. The system also provides up-to-date information on a map-based display.

Despite these capabilities, the system does have limitations. In particular, it does not integrate well with the GCCS systems used for joint operations. This creates a risk of bad data and database errors in such scenarios.

ABCS combines seven packages into a single system:

1. The Maneuver Control System (MCS) allows the operator to define routes and view overlays to provide situational awareness. MCS is being phased out and replaced with "Lightning", an ABCS enabled Flash/Java Program that uses the Web Browser interface. It allows users to publish products from CPOF without using the BCS (Battle Command Server) PASS (Publish and Subscribe Service) Server, making Lightning more flexible as it can be used on any Secret Internet Protocol Router Network (SIPRnet-System) as there is no interface software required besides your web browser (Typically IE 8.0 or higher, not compatible with Opera or Firefox at this time.) The system was developed and integrated by Ford Aerospace and Communications Corp. (FACC), Colorado Springs, Colorado.
2. The Air and Missile Defense Workstations (AMDWS) provide soldiers with an Air Defense picture, and supports the Surface Launched Advanced Medium Range Air-to-Air Missile (SLAM-RAAM) Air Defense Artillery (ADA) system by providing an automated defense planning capability for deployed units.
3. The Battle Command Sustainment & Support System (BCS3) integrates multiple data sources into one program and provides commanders with a visual layout of battlefield logistics.
4. The All Source Analysis System (ASAS) can analyze incidents and help determine the patterns of Improvised Explosive Device-related incidents. A commander can determine locations that are typical for IED attacks, so that they know to warn their soldiers of such a threat.
5. The Advanced Field Artillery Tactical Data System (AFATDS) plan and execute fires during each phase of action, whether a deliberate attack or defensive operation. AFATDS is fielded to all Active Component Army and Marine Corps units. About 90% of the National Guard has been fielded. AFATDS is installed on large-deck amphibious assault vessels of the United States Navy.
6. The Force XXI Battle Command, Brigade & Below/Blue Force Tracking (FBCB2/BFT) system uses satellite and terrestrial communications technology to track and display friendly vehicles and aircraft that appear on a computer screen as blue icons over a topographical map or satellite image of the ground. Commanders and Soldiers can add red icons that show up as enemy on the screen, and are simultaneously broadcast to all the other FBCB2/BFT users on the battlefield. There are about 15,000 FBCB2/BFT systems in use today.
7. The Tactical Airspace Integration System (TAIS) is an automated system for battlefield airspace management.

Additional systems that are integrated with the ABCS suite include:

- Digital Topographic Support System (DTSS) Provides digital Terrain Analysis, terrain data base(s), updated terrain products, and hard copy repro, in support of Terrain Visualization, IPB, C2, and Battle Staff DMP (CORPS/DIV/BDE).
- The Global Command and Control System - Army (GCCS-A) provides a common picture of Army tactical operations to the Joint and Coalition community, and facilitates interoperability of systems across Army/Joint theaters, however no true synchronization occurs with PASS/DDS which introducing many issues on the battlefield for Soldiers, Marines, Sailors and Air force personnel. This issue can potentially put their lives at risk.
- The Integrated Meteorological System (IMETS) provides Commanders at all echelons with an automated weather system to receive, process, and disseminate weather observations, forecasts, and weather and environmental effects decision aids for ABCS.
- The Command Post of the Future (CPOF) application communicates with ABCS through GCCS-J, DDS/PASS and other means.

== See also ==
- Project Manager Battle Command
- Integrated Air and Missile Defense Battle Command System

Other nations

- Artillery Combat Command and Control System - Indian equivalent
