= Command Post of the Future =

US Army C2 software system

The United States Army's Command Post of the Future (CPOF) is a C2 software system that allows commanders to maintain topsight over the battlefield; collaborate with superiors, peers and subordinates over live data; and communicate their intent.

Originally a DARPA technology demonstration, in 2006 CPOF became an Army Program of Record. It is managed by the Product Manager Tactical Mission Command at Aberdeen Proving Ground, Maryland, and integrated with the Army's Maneuver Control System and other products. The prime contractor on the CPOF program is General Dynamics C4 Systems, which purchased the original developer of the software (MAYA Viz Ltd) in 2005.

== Overview ==
CPOF began as a DARPA investigation to improve mission command using networked information visualization systems, with the goal of doubling the speed and quality of command decisions. The system was developed in a research setting by Global Infotek, Inc.; ISX Corporation (now part of Lockheed Martin Advanced Technology Laboratories); Oculus Info, Inc. (now called Uncharted Software Inc.); SYS Technologies, Inc.; and MAYA Viz (now part of General Dynamics C4 Systems) with the active participation of military personnel as subject matter experts.

CPOF is one of several examples of collaborative software, but intended specifically for use in a mission command. A shared workspace is the main interface, in which every interface element in CPOF is a shared piece of data in a networked repository. Shared visual elements in CPOF include iconic representations of hard data, such as units, events, and tasks; visualization frameworks such as maps or schedule charts on which those icons appear; and brush-marks, ink-strokes, highlighting, notes and other annotation.

All visual elements in CPOF are interactive via drag-and-drop gestures. Users can drag data-elements and annotation from any visualization framework into any other (i.e., from a chart to a table), which reveal different data-attributes in context depending on the visualization used. Most data-elements can be grouped and nested via drag-and-drop to form associations that remain with the data in all of its views. Drag-and-drop composition on live visualizations is CPOF's primary mechanism for editing data values, such as locations on a map or tasks on a schedule (for example, moving an event-icon on a map changes the lat/lon values of that event in the shared repository; moving a task icon on a schedule changes its time-based values in the shared repository). The results of editing gestures are conveyed in real-time to all observers and users of a visualization; when one user moves an event on a map, for example, that event-icon moves on all maps and shared views, such that all users see its new location immediately. Data inputs from warfighters are conveyed to all collaborators as the "natural" result of a drop-gesture in-situ, requiring no explicit publishing mechanism.

CPOF is also used as a live-data alternative to PowerPoint briefings. During a CPOF briefing, commanders can drill into any data element in a high-level view to see details on demand, and view outliers or other elements of interest in different visual contexts without switching applications. Annotations and editing-gestures made during briefings become part of the shared repository. The commander's topsight is based on ground-truth at the moment of the briefing; the commander can then communicate intent on live data.

CPOF users at any level can assemble workspaces out of smaller tool-and-appliance primitives, allowing members of a collaborating group to organize their workflows according to their needs, without affecting or disrupting the views of other users. CPOF's Tool-and-appliance primitives are designed to let users create quick, throw-away mini-applications to meet their needs in-situ, supporting on-the-fly uses of the software that no developer or designer could have anticipated.

The CPOF software is based on the CoMotion platform, a proprietary commercial framework for building collaborative information visualization systems and domain-independent "decision communities". CoMotion's design principles originated as a research program at Carnegie Mellon University led by Steven Roth, and was subsequently developed at MAYA Viz Ltd and General Dynamics C4 Systems.

== Operational details ==
CPOF uses a proprietary navigational style database based on U-forms to store, represent, and operate upon a wide variety of types of data. CPOF can receive real-time or near-real-time data from a variety of standard sources—such as GCCS-A, C2PC, and ABCS—and display them using MIL-STD-2525B symbols on maps and charts. Plans, schedules, notes, briefings, and other battle-related information can be composed and shared between warfighters. All maps, charts, pasteboards, and other work products can be marked up with permanent and/or fading ink, and annotated with text or "stickies" to provide further context. A VOIP solution is included, although it can integrate with a pre-existing voice solution.

Fault tolerance for low bandwidth, high latency, and/or error-prone TCP/IP networks is supported by CPOF's multi-tiered client-server architecture. It can thus be deployed on systems from a two-hop geosynchronous satellite link to a radio network such as JNN while remaining collaborative. The software is largely Java-based, but is only currently deployed on a Microsoft Windows platform.

== Deployment ==
CPOF was first deployed operationally in a handful of locations in Baghdad, Iraq by the 1st Cavalry Division of the US Army in 2004, and was subsequently deployed throughout Iraq and Afghanistan and used by coalition forces. Variants of CPOF have participated in United States Joint Forces Command's Urban Resolve 2015, the United States Air Force's Joint Expeditionary Force Experiment 06 and 08, and has been in use by the Marines in Combat Operation Centers since 2007.

CPOF became an official US Army program of record in 2006.

== See also ==
- Collaboration
- Collaborative software
- Project Manager Battle Command
