= Group of Governmental Experts on Lethal Autonomous Weapons Systems =

UN expert group on lethal autonomous weapons systems

The Group of Governmental Experts on Lethal Autonomous Weapons Systems, commonly known as the GGE on LAWS, refers to a group of governmental experts established under the framework of the Convention on Certain Conventional Weapons (CCW), a United Nations arms control framework. The group examines legal, ethical, societal and moral questions that arise from the increased use of autonomous robots to carry weapons and to be programmed to engage in combat in various situations that might arise, including battles between countries, or in patrolling border areas or sensitive areas, or other similar roles.

As of 18 March 2025, the Convention on Certain Conventional Weapons had 128 High Contracting Parties. In the Geneva Conventions, the term "High Contracting Parties" refers to the states that have joined the conventions and are therefore bound to uphold them. Among the countries that have joined are states with tense relations or ongoing armed conflict with one another, including Russia and Ukraine, Israel and the State of Palestine, and Pakistan and Afghanistan.

== Background ==
In 2013, the Meeting of State Parties to the Convention on Certain Conventional Weapons agreed on a mandate on lethal autonomous weapon systems and tasked its chairperson with convening an informal Meeting of Experts to discuss issues related to emerging technologies in the area of LAWS. Those informal Meetings of Experts were then held in 2014, 2015 and 2016, and their reports fed into subsequent meetings of the High Contracting Parties.

At the Fifth CCW Review Conference in 2016, the High Contracting Parties decided to establish an open-ended Group of Governmental Experts on emerging technologies in the area of LAWS, building on the earlier expert meetings. Since then, the group has been reconvened annually.

In 2023, the Meeting of the High Contracting Parties to the CCW decided that the GGE on LAWS would continue its work in 2024 and 2025. The group was tasked with developing, by consensus, elements of a possible instrument, without predetermining its form, as well as other measures addressing lethal autonomous weapon systems, drawing on existing CCW protocols, earlier recommendations, state proposals, and legal, military, and technological expertise.

== 2024 ==
In 2024, the GGE met twice, and the group was chaired by Robert in den Bosch, the Netherlands' disarmament ambassador. The 2024 Meeting of the High Contracting Parties decided that the group would meet for 10 days in 2025, in two five-day sessions, and reaffirmed its mandate to continue work by consensus on possible elements of an instrument and other measures addressing lethal autonomous weapon systems.

== 2025 ==
At its first 2025 session, held in Geneva from 3 to 7 March 2025, the Group of Governmental Experts on Lethal Autonomous Weapon Systems discussed revisions to the chair's rolling text. The text was structured into five sections, or "boxes", though delegates held differing views on whether headings were useful or appropriate. Broadly, the discussions covered the characterization of lethal autonomous weapon systems, the application of international humanitarian law, possible prohibitions and regulations, legal review, and questions of accountability and responsibility.

At its second session, held from 1 to 5 September 2025, delegations continued work on the chair's rolling text, which set out elements of a possible instrument and was organized into five thematic "boxes".

== 2026 ==
=== Developments before the 2026 session ===
A few weeks before the meeting, autonomous weapons drew renewed attention when the United States pressured Anthropic to revise the terms of use for its AI model Claude. Anthropic prohibited the model's use for mass domestic surveillance and for fully autonomous weapons operating without human oversight, while reports also emerged that OpenAI had reached an agreement with the U.S. Department of War for the use of its AI models, reportedly stipulating that they would not independently direct autonomous weapons where human control was required. The U.S. military nevertheless continued to use Claude during its war on Iran, and there was increasing alarm about the use of AI-assisted semi-autonomous weapons in conflicts including those in Ukraine, Sudan, Gaza, and Iran.

Before the start of the sessions, Robert in den Bosch, as chair, warned that progress was urgent because technological developments were moving quickly. At the same time, although states agreed that international humanitarian law applied to LAWS, specific internationally binding standards governing such systems remained largely absent. A key divide before the session was that Russia and the United States opposed new legally binding instruments, while other states argued that new rules were necessary. According to Robert in den Bosch, the talks could lead to new rules, amendments to an existing convention, or a new treaty.

=== First session ===
From 2 to 6 March 2026, the group held its penultimate session under the group's three-year mandate. Delegations discussed the chair's rolling draft text, circulated in December 2025, on elements of a possible instrument or other measures concerning lethal autonomous weapon systems. In revised text circulated by the chair on 5 March 2026, a lethal autonomous weapon system was characterized as "a functionally integrated combination of one or more weapons and technological components, that can identify, select, and engage a target, without intervention by a human operator in the execution of these tasks". The text was divided into five boxes to structure discussion. During the session, delegates conducted a first reading of the draft text, and the chair later circulated revised language for several sections. Informal consultations were also held. According to campaign groups and participating observers, support grew during the week for moving to negotiations on the basis of the rolling text, with more than 70 states said to support that step by the end of the session, though some participants warned that attempts to bridge differences risked blurring the group's core purpose.

The International Committee of the Red Cross argued that the text should not only restate existing international humanitarian law, but also clarify how those rules apply to autonomous weapons and set out additional measures tailored to the specific challenges such systems raise. Stop Killer Robots Likewise emphasized the need to preserve meaningful human control over increasingly autonomous systems.

During the discussions, the U.S. delegation opposed the term "human control" and reportedly proposed the alternative phrase "good faith human judgment and care". Other delegations rejected that wording as too weak, while many states continued to insist that meaningful human control over weapon systems remained essential.

== See also ==
- Robot
- Robotics
