= Artillery Combat Command and Control System =

Command and control

- Type: Command and control
- Place of origin: India

Service history
- In service: 2009–present
- Used by: Indian Army
- Wars: 2025 India–Pakistan conflict

Production history
- Designer: Directorate General of Information Systems, Indian Army (Project Management Organization); Bharat Electronics; Centre for Artificial Intelligence and Robotics; Armament Research and Development Establishment
- Manufacturer: Bharat Electronics

The Artillery Combat Command and Control System (ACCCS), under Project SHAKTI (lit. 'Power') is an indigenous, integrated, digitized, networked command and control (C4I) platform developed by the Indian Army's Directorate General of Information Systems (Project Management Organization), in partnership with Bharat Electronics, Centre for Artificial Intelligence and Robotics, and Armament Research and Development Establishment.

ACCCS provides automation and support for operational decision-making, from the corps to the artillery battery. It serves as the nerve centre for Regiment of Artillery's fire power. On June 12, 2009, the ACCCS was handed over to Lieutenant General KR Rao, Director General of Artillery, and General Deepak Kapoor, Chief of the Army Staff.

== System ==
ACCCS performs tactical fire control, fire planning, deployment management to achieve maximum fire densities at important regions, operational logistics management, and technical control based on time and position accuracy. It can deliver hits at key locations with concentrated firepower and concentrate artillery firepower at the tactical scale. It is one of the most efficient operational information systems in the Indian Army, which is constantly being enhanced. The updated tactical computer, the gun display unit, and the handheld computer are manufactured by Bharat Electronics.

As of 2007, the project's estimated cost was ₹36 billion (US$400 million). A report from November 22, 2007, stated that ACCCS was having technical problems and that the project was running behind schedule. Foreign assistance has been sought to fix it. BEL denied technical problems and disclosed that the Indian Army had changed the quality criteria for computers and other subsystems in the middle. According to Ministry of Defense sources, BEL bought old computers from Elbit Systems as a temporary measure until local development was finished, for which the Indian Army requested upgrades. The Army Battle Command System provided conceptual framework for Project SHAKTI.

It was CAIR that designed and developed the foundational technology. BEL was given the task of developing and manufacturing computers and intelligent terminals that were connected as a wide area network. The main subsystems are the gun display unit, remote access terminal, battery computer, and artillery computer center. ACCCS is remotely connected to artillery control equipment, guided missile systems, and artillery gun fire control systems. The battlefield commander and military headquarters are then linked to these systems. With help from Rosboronxport, the Defence Research and Development Organisation developed the fire control system. The ACCCS fire control system consists of three components: reconnaissance, guidance, and communication control. The automation of ACCCS effectively increased artillery firepower of Indian Army by five fold.

All fire-control systems had to be compatible with Project SHAKTI, as required by the Indian Army's directive for artillery units using mounted gun systems, as per 2021 request for information proposal. Pinaka multi-barrel rocket launcher is being integrated with the ACCCS, along with the newly inducted howitzers. The ATAGS is compatible with ACCCS in terms of technical fire control, fire planning, deployment management, and operational logistics management. Swathi Weapon Locating Radar is networked with the ACCCS.

ACCCS is linked to the Indian Army's Command Information Decision Support System, which is a part of the Tactical Command, Control, Communications, and Information (TAC-C3I) System. It further developed into Artillery Combat Command Control and Communication System (ACCCCS), which utilizes Survey of India's Defence Series Maps, machine learning, and artificial intelligence. The Indian Army's C4I2SR (Command, Control, Communications, Computers, Intelligence, Interoperability, Surveillance and Reconnaissance) infrastructure relies on TAC-C3I.

According to the MoD Annual Report 2023–24, Phase IV of Project SHAKTI is replacing Phase I and Phase II implementation. It now includes integrated GIS support, thermal imaging integration observations equipment, a meteorological system, muzzle velocity measuring instruments, sensors, and support equipment for the automated execution of ACCCS functions.

== Upgrades ==
The Indian Army is pursuing several initiatives to attain information dominance. To operationalize the enhancements via a high-bandwidth secure network, the Army is setting up captive data centers, which will be completely operational by the end of 2023.

To address the need for network-centric warfare, BEL delivered a new artillery combat and control system, called Shakti, to the Indian Army on January 20, 2013. It will serve as TAC-C3I's main subsystem. Fiber-optic cable, landlines, and radio networks connect Shakti's enhanced tactical computer, handheld computer, and gun display unit. Shakti uses software that interfaces with the Geographic Information System and Global Navigation Satellite System to automate and integrate artillery operational activities. Determining trajectories, responding to fire requests, managing ammunition, suggesting gun deployment sites and observation posts for offensive and defensive operations, delivering ammunition and logistical support on schedule, and developing task tables, fire plans, and automatic gun program generation are among Shakti's key functions. The DRDO and BEL worked together to create the system software. It has undergone a thorough field evaluation trial, integration testing, verification and validation trials, and several user assessments.

As of 2022, a project sanction order has been granted under Defence Acquisition Procedure 2020 (Make II category) for the development of high frequency software-defined radio. The Indian Army intends to purchase 300 SDRs. It will make GIS-based blue force tracking and long-distance radio communication possible. The Indian Army is modernizing the ACCCS with new situational awareness modules and Defense Series Maps as part of the Year of Transformation 2023. On February 6, 2025, a contract was signed by the MoD and Bharat Electronics for software improvements in Shakti.

On October 7, 2025, DRDO released the Indian Radio Software Architecture (IRSA) 1.0 standard for SDR interoperability and waveform portability. On 28 October, the Indian Army and BEL signed a deal for DRDO developed, IRSA-certified SDR which enables safe communication in high data rate tactical mobile ad hoc network.

Project Sanjay

The Indian Army partnered with BEL and CAIR to design the Battlefield Surveillance System (BSS), which would connect the sensor-shooter grid to the ACCCS. It made it easier to integrate a large number of sensors and set up 60 field formation surveillance centers. An all-encompassing system that incorporates sensor data and information enables quick decision-making. In 2022, BSS was extensively validated in plains, deserts, and mountains from August to October. With a success rate of more than 95%, it met Indian Army's performance standards. BEL was awarded the contract to supply BSS to Army field formations along the northern and western borders by December 2025 under Buy (Indian) category. The initial estimate of ₹2,700 crore (US$320 million) for the development was later revised to ₹2,402 crore (US$280 million).

It was formally introduced by Defense Minister Rajnath Singh on January 24, 2025. This automated system combines and processes inputs from satellites, helicopters, UAVs, air defense radars, battlefield surveillance radars, counter-battery radars, long-range reconnaissance and observation systems, thermal imagers, reconnaissance vehicles, and patrolling to guarantee accuracy, prevent redundancy, and produce an integrated picture for tactical battle. It examine regions 200 kilometers outside the international border. It will be integrated into brigades, divisions, and corps between March and October 2025. A generator, a communication control unit, a monitoring center, and communication monitoring terminals are part of the system. BSS is highly mobile. It displays the strategic places used by the military. In addition to sending audio, video, content, and images over fiber-optics and secure HF, VHF, and UHF networks, BSS uses AI analytics to find and assess the target.

Situational Reporting Over Enterprise-Class GIS platform (e-Sitrep)

With features like geovisualization, temporal and dynamic querying, and analytics depending on authorization levels, the e-Sitrep is customized to meet the Army's operational needs. In June 2023, it was put into service.

Project Avgat (Army’s Own Gati Shakti)

It introduces multi-domain spatial awareness by combining data from different operational domains on a common INDIGIS-Enterprise platform. There will be a gradual operationalization of Project Avgat. The initial phase will integrate logistical inputs, satellite data, topographic inputs, and meteorological inputs. The system was put into use by the end of 2023.

Situational Awareness Module for the Army (SAMA)

Created in partnership with the Bhaskaracharya Institute for Space Applications and Geo-Informatics and the Ministry of Electronics and Information Technology, SAMA is a comprehensive combat information decision support system that combines inputs from all operational and managerial information systems, including ACCCS, BSS, e-Sitrep, and MISO, to give commanders a complete picture of the battlefield. It was used for field validation at the corps level in May 2023. SAMA was operationalized first by the Army's Northern Command in June 2023.

Project Anumaan

On November 24, 2022, a memorandum of understanding was signed by the Indian Army to help the National Center for Medium Range Weather Forecasting collect data along the Chinese borders. The Anumaan application for artillery operation was developed to offer accurate weather prediction along high-altitude regions. Additionally, it will support intelligence collection and surveillance. The software will be made available by the Indian Army on May 19, 2023.

== Operational history ==
The upgraded artillery combat and control system Shakti helped the Regiment of Artillery to automate and speed up the firing process during Operation Sindoor in 2025 India–Pakistan conflict. The AI-enabled Meteorological Reporting System, created under Project Anumaan, was fed data from the India Meteorological Department to forecast precise wind speed and other weather parameters up to 200 kilometres (120 miles) inside Pakistan, 48-72 hours in advance. This allowed for planning and accurate targeting using extended range artillery shells. During the operation, the Battlefield Surveillance System, which was created as part of Project Sanjay, was set up along the India–Pakistan border. It made it possible to employ edge AI on the battlefield to process information locally and assist in decision-making without relying on remote servers.

By integrating with Project Sanjay, the Trinetra system improved resource coordination and decision-making by assisting in the creation of a shared operational and intelligence picture at the tactical and operational levels.

== See also ==
Other nations

- Army Battle Command System - U.S. equivalent
