= Convention on Certain Conventional Weapons =

Arms control treaty

Convention on Prohibitions or Restrictions on the Use of Certain Conventional Weapons which may be deemed to be Excessively Injurious or to have Indiscriminate Effects
Participation in the Convention on Certain Conventional Weapons
Signed and ratified
Acceded or succeeded
Accepted
Only signed
- Type: Arms control
- Drafted: October 10, 1980
- Signed: April 10, 1981
- Location: Geneva, Switzerland
- Effective: December 2, 1983
- Original signatories: 50 States
- Parties: 128; Complete List
- Depositary: UN Secretary-General
- Languages: Arabic; Chinese; English; French; Russian; Spanish

Full text
- Convention on Certain Conventional Weapons at Wikisource

The United Nations Convention on Certain Conventional Weapons (CCW or CCWC), concluded at Geneva on October 10, 1980, and entered into force in December 1983, seeks to prohibit or restrict the use of certain conventional weapons which are considered excessively injurious or whose effects are indiscriminate. The full title of the treaty is "Convention on Prohibitions or Restrictions on the Use of Certain Conventional Weapons Which May Be Deemed to Be Excessively Injurious or to Have Indiscriminate Effects." The convention covers land mines, booby traps, incendiary devices, blinding laser weapons and clearance of explosive remnants of war.

== Objectives ==
The aim of the convention and its protocols is to provide new rules for the protection of civilians from injury by weapons that are used in armed conflicts and also to protect combatants from unnecessary suffering. The convention covers fragments that are undetectable in the human body by X-rays, landmines and booby traps, and incendiary weapons, blinding laser weapons and the clearance of explosive remnants of war. Parties to the convention must take legislative and other actions to ensure compliance with the convention.

CCWC includes five protocols dealing with specific weapons. The convention and its annexed protocols apply in all types of armed conflict, both international and non-international. This was not the case when the convention was first adopted, but the scope was expanded by two conferences in 1996 and 2001. Some provisions also apply after open hostilities has ended, such as the rules in protocols II and V about minimizing the dangers from mines and other ordnance.

CCWC lacks verification and enforcement mechanisms and spells out no formal process for resolving compliance concerns. A state-party can refute its commitment to the convention or any of the protocols, but it will remain legally bound until one year after notifying the treaty depositary, the UN Secretary-General, of its intent to be free of its obligations.

== Adoption and entry into force ==
The CCWC consist of a set of additional protocols first formulated on October 10, 1980, in Geneva and entered into force on December 2, 1983. As of the end of July 2024, there are 128 state parties to the convention. Some of those countries have only adopted some of the five protocols, with two being the minimum required to be considered a party.

The convention has five protocols:

- Protocol I restricts weapons with non-detectable fragments
- Protocol II restricts landmines, booby traps
- Protocol III restricts incendiary weapons
- Protocol IV restricts blinding laser weapons (adopted on October 13, 1995, in Vienna)
- Protocol V sets out obligations and best practice for the clearance of explosive remnants of war, adopted on November 28, 2003, in Geneva

Protocol II was amended in 1996 (extending its scope of application), and entered in force on December 3, 1998. The amendment extended the restrictions on landmine use to internal conflicts; established reliability standards for remotely delivered mines; and prohibited the use of non-detectable fragments in anti-personnel landmines (APL). The failure to agree to a total ban on landmines led to the Ottawa Treaty.

== Protocol I: Non-Detectable Fragments ==
Protocol I on Non-Detectable Fragments prohibits the use of any weapon the primary effect of which is to injure by fragments which are not detectable in the human body by X-rays. The reason is that such fragments are difficult to remove and cause unnecessary suffering. The protocol applies when the "primary effect" is to injure by non-detectable fragments and does not prohibit all use of e.g. plastic in weapons design.

== Protocol II: Mines, Booby Traps and Other Devices ==
Protocol II on Prohibitions or Restrictions on the Use of Mines, Booby-Traps and Other Devices was amended on May 3, 1996, to strengthen its provisions and extend the scope of application to cover both international and internal armed conflicts. The protocol regulates, but does not ban, land mines. It prohibits the use of non-detectable anti-personnel mines and their transfer; prohibits the use of non-self-destructing and non-self-deactivating mines outside fenced, monitored and marked areas; prohibits directing mines and booby traps against civilians; requires parties to the conflict to remove mines and booby traps when the conflict ends; broadens obligations of protecting peacekeeping and other missions of the United Nations and its agencies; requires States to enforce compliance with its provisions within their jurisdiction; and calls for penal sanctions in case of violation.

== Protocol III: Incendiary Weapons ==
Protocol III on Prohibitions or Restrictions on the Use of Incendiary Weapons prohibits, in all circumstances, making the civilian population as such, individual civilians or civilian objects, the object of attack by any weapon or munition which is primarily designed to set fire to objects or to cause burn injury to persons through the action of flame, heat or a combination thereof, produced by a chemical reaction of a substance delivered on the target. The protocol also prohibits the use of air-delivered incendiary weapons against military targets within a concentration of civilians, and limits the use of incendiary weapons delivered by other means. Forest and other plants may not be a target unless they are used to conceal combatants or other military objectives. Protocol III lists certain munition types like smoke shells which only have a secondary or additional incendiary effect; these munition types are not considered to be incendiary weapons.

== Protocol IV: Blinding Laser Weapons ==
Protocol IV on Blinding Laser Weapons prohibits the use of laser weapons specifically designed to cause permanent blindness. The parties to the protocol also agree to not transfer such weapons to any state or non-state entity. The protocol does not prohibit laser systems where blinding is an incidental or collateral effect, but parties that agree to it must take all feasible precautions to avoid such effects.

== Protocol V: Explosive Remnants of War ==
Protocol V on Explosive Remnants of War requires the clearance of UXO (unexploded ordnance), such as unexploded bomblets from cluster bombs and abandoned explosive weapons. At the cessation of active hostilities, Protocol V establishes a responsibility on parties that have used explosive weapons to assist with the clearance of unexploded ordnance that this use has created. Parties are also required, subject to certain qualifications, to provide information on their use of explosive weapons. Each party is responsible for the territory in their control after a conflict. The protocol does not apply to mines and other weapons covered by protocol II. The protocol came about as a result of a growing awareness during the 1990s that the protection against unexploded ordnance was insufficient. The protocol was adopted in 2003 and entered into force in 2006.

== Group of Governmental Experts on LAWS ==
Under the framework of the CCWC, states have discussed lethal autonomous weapon systems since 2014. In 2016, the treaty's states parties established an open-ended Group of Governmental Experts on lethal autonomous weapons systems to continue those discussions. The discussions have addressed international humanitarian law, accountability, possible prohibitions and regulations, and the extent of human control required over AI-enabled weapons.

== Other proposals ==
As of 2017, the CCW has failed to achieve consensus to open negotiations on adding a compliance mechanism to help ensure parties honor their commitments. China and Russia have opposed restrictions on anti-vehicle mines, such as a requirement that such mines self-deactivate. In the 2010s the CCW opened talks on restricting lethal autonomous weapons. As of 2021, most of the major powers oppose an international ban on lethal autonomous weapons.

== See also ==
- Napalm
- United Nations Commission on Conventional Armaments, earlier attempt at regulation
