= AI warfare =

Use of AI in war

AI warfare refers to the use of artificial intelligence technologies to automate military operation and enhance or bypass human decision-making in armed conflicts. AI is used to rapidly analyze large volumes of military intelligence data, including making recommendations or decisions on who and what to target. Abdul-Rahman al-Rawi, a 20-year-old student, was the first acknowledged civilian killed by AI-assisted airstrike in a U.S. strike in Iraq in 2024. In 2026, the U.S. declared it would become an 'AI-first' warfighting force.

== History ==
=== 2022–present Russo-Ukrainian war ===
Ukraine launched a project with Palantir called Brave1 Dataroom to build AI systems using the extensive combat data Ukraine has gathered throughout the Russo-Ukrainian war since Russia’s full-scale invasion in 2022. The country has also created tools for in-depth airstrike analysis, introduced AI to process large volumes of intelligence, and incorporated these technologies into the planning of long-range strike operations.

=== 2023–present Gaza war ===
As part of the Gaza war, the Israel Defense Forces (IDF) have used artificial intelligence to rapidly and automatically perform much of the process of determining what to bomb in the Gaza Strip. IDF's Unit 8200 developed AI systems, dubbed the Gospel and Lavender, to find targets for the Israeli Air Force to bomb. The Gospel automatically provides targeting recommendations to human analysts, who decide whether to approve strikes. Lavender identified 37,000 Hamas-linked individuals early in the war, and was used alongside the Gospel, which chooses buildings or structures as targets. According to a report by +972 Magazine and Local Call, strikes assisted by Lavender were routinely permitted to kill 5–20 civilians for each suspected Hamas militant, who were often bombed at home with their families. The IDF denies these claims, maintaining that every strike is assessed to minimize collateral damage, and that there is no policy "to kill tens of thousands of people in their homes."

Israel deployed AI technologies during the Gaza war for audio analysis, facial recognition, and airstrike targeting. One such system was used to help identify the location of Hamas commander Ibrahim Biari through phone call analysis, leading to strikes that killed him as well as more than 125 civilians.

=== 2026 Iran war ===
The 2026 Iran war has been described as the "first AI war", although the United States and Israel have previously used AI to identify targets during conflicts in the Middle East and during the Gaza war respectively . The U.S. has used AI tools to attack Iran. These tools have been used for military intelligence, targeting, and damage assessment in the war in Iran. Using the Maven smart system, the U.S. attacked 1,000 targets in the first 24 hours of the war and 5,000 targets over the course of 10 days. The Pentagon revealed that Elon Musk's Grok AI tool was in use within Project Maven. While the U.S. had used Maven in 2022 to share targeting information with Ukraine and strike against Iraq, Syria, and against the Houthis in 2024, Iran's attacks are its biggest. Authorities are looking into whether artificial intelligence was involved in the airstrike on an Iranian school that killed 170 civilians, the majority of whom were children. The United States Central Command emphasized that humans were making final targeting decisions.

Per a White House tally released on April 8, the U.S. military hit over 13,000 targets in Iran during the war's first 38 days, including more than 2,000 command-and-control sites, 1,500 air defense targets, and 1,450 industrial infrastructure targets.

In spring of 2026, a USSOCOM intelligence report written in part with AI erroneously claimed that a Chinese ship in the region was transporting materials for a nuclear weapons program. A planned maritime interdiction operation got as far along as to have planes in the air before further investigation found the report to be inaccurate.

== Involved companies ==
Maven Smart System is developed by Palantir. It integrates Anthropic's Claude as its large language model, and uses Amazon's AWS servers as its cloud infrastructure. Since Anthropic's refusal to support autonomous weapons development and domestic surveillance efforts, other AI firms in its place, including OpenAI, have been brought in to take over that role.

== Involved state actors ==
In 2024, the United States Department of Defense had 800-plus active AI-related projects and requested $1.8 billion in AI funding, with Project Maven and Project Artemis (AI-resistant drones developed together with Ukraine) being the main ones. The technology has been used in Iran, Iraq, Syria and Yemen to identify targets.

China is pursuing intelligentized warfare, integrating AI across all combat domains—land, sea, air, space, and cyber—with military AI spending exceeding $1.6 billion annually.

== International regulation ==
Since 2014, states meeting within the framework of the Convention on Certain Conventional Weapons have discussed lethal autonomous weapon systems. In 2016, the treaty's states parties established an open-ended Group of Governmental Experts on Lethal Autonomous Weapons Systems to continue those discussions. The discussions have addressed international humanitarian law, accountability, possible prohibitions and regulations, and the extent of human control required over AI-enabled weapons.

== Related terminology ==
In 2018, the term hyperwar was coined to refer to algorithmic or AI-controlled warfare with little to no human decision-making.

== See also ==
- Military applications of artificial intelligence
- AI-assisted targeting in Palestine
- Lethal autonomous weapon
- NAZA (film)
- Shield AI
