= No Tech for Apartheid =

International advocacy campaign

- Abbreviation: NoTA
- Founded: October 2021 (5 years ago)
- Founded at: United States
- Type: Campaign
- Purpose: Israeli–Palestinian conflict, Project Nimbus, anti-Zionism, labor rights
- Location: International
- Origins: MPower Change, Jewish Voice for Peace
- Website: notechforapartheid.com/

No Tech for Apartheid (NoTA) is an international campaign that works to end Project Nimbus, a contract between Google, Amazon and Israel. Starting with an anonymous letter written by Google and Amazon workers condemning the deal, the group eventually became a dedicated campaign with an emphasis on pressuring the two tech giants to cancel the project. The workers argue that the relative lack of oversight for the project means it likely will be used for violent purposes. Under the terms of the agreement, it appears that the companies in question are not permitted to deny services to any government entities, meaning that while certain uses might run up against their terms of service, Google and Amazon are not necessarily able to prevent services provided as part of Nimbus from being used for violent acts.

== Founding ==
In April 2021 the Israeli Ministry of Finance announced that Google and Amazon had won the bid to "set up and operate Israel's Project Nimbus", described as "a massive state tender that will see Israel build its own local cloud storage server centers at an investment of roughly 4 billion shekel." In 2022, The Intercept 'obtained' a trove of documents and videos showing the exact kinds of products Google would be providing to the Israeli government, including the "full suite of machine-learning and AI tools available through Google Cloud Platform", without providing specifics of how they would be used. This ambiguity led employees at both companies to begin agitating against the deal internally, and when that did not get results or even a response, workers created an external campaign to put pressure on their employers, following the model of Mijente's "No Tech for ICE" campaign.

=== Demonstrations ===
NoTA has engaged in multiple demonstrations since its formation, often outside conferences and outside corporate headquarters across multiple US states and countries.

In June 2024 the campaign announced a pledge wherein "More than 1,100 self-identified STEM students and young workers from more than 120 universities have signed a pledge to not take jobs or internships at Google or Amazon until the companies end their involvement in Project Nimbus".

== Google and Amazon's response ==
Google has repeatedly stated that its work on the Project Nimbus contract is "not aimed at military work" and that it is not "relevant to weapons or intelligence services", and Amazon has not publicly discussed the project. In February 2024, however, the head of the Israeli National Cyber Directorate was quoted as saying "Phenomenal things are happening in battle because of the Nimbus public cloud, things that are impactful for victory. And I will not share details."

In March 2024, a Google Cloud software engineer was fired after a video of them shouting "I refuse to build technology that empowers genocide," in reference to Project Nimbus, at a company event went viral. On 16 April, dozens of employees participated in sit-ins at Google's New York and Sunnyvale Headquarters to protest against Google supplying cloud computing software to the Israeli government. Employees occupied the office of Google Cloud chief executive Thomas Kurian, while livestreaming the peaceful protest. Nine employees were charged with trespassing and 28 were fired, with firings reaching over 50 individuals in the days after the protests. NoTA criticized Google by calling this "a flagrant retaliation" against workers including those who were not directly involved in the sit-in. Google denied firing any employee who was not directly involved and maintained that Project Nimbus involved non-military workloads compliant with Google's Terms of Service:

We have been very clear that the Nimbus contract is for workloads running on our commercial cloud by Israeli government ministries, who agree to comply with our Terms of Service and Acceptable Use Policy. This work is not directed at highly sensitive, classified, or military workloads relevant to weapons or intelligence services.

== See also ==
- No Azure for Apartheid
- Criticism of Google
- Criticism of Amazon
- List of companies involved in the Gaza war
