= Frank Radice =

- Born: Francis John Radice; 1949 (age 76–77); Washington, DC, U.S.
- Other name: Frank Radice
- Education: Bethesda Chevy Chase High School, 1968; University of Maryland, College Park, 1972
- Occupation: Television Industry Executive
- Years active: 1972 - Present

Frank Radice is a television industry executive, businessman and author. He resides in New York City and London, England.

Radice currently serves as Managing Partner of VIDA F.R. Company, a promotion, marketing, media, and consulting firm with offices in New York City, Los Angeles, and London. Radice also serves as the Expert-in-Residence at Definition 6, an Atlanta-based unified digital marketing agency . He is also the Creative Adviser to Thought Development and ON-AIR Pro. Radice is a Member, Directors Guild of America (DGA), Writer/Member, Broadcast Music Incorporated (BMI) and on the Executive Advisory Board for the Broadway Walk of Stars.

== Television career (1972–2009) ==
Frank Radice was President and Chief Marketing Officer of the National Academy of Television Arts & Sciences (NATAS) where he added a new category of National Emmy Award for Promotional Announcements and transacted a deal with Associated Television International to broadcast the Daytime Emmy’s on the CW.

From 1973 to 1991, Radice was a producer at ABC News for Nightline, World News Tonight, Good Morning America and The Last Word.

At NBC, Radice was an executive vice president who helped develop the "NBC News: America's News Leader" campaign.

In 2007, he oversaw the marketing of “Where in the World is Matt Lauer?" which became a successful online NBC Today Show franchise and was sold to Hyundai Motors under a sponsorship agreement. Radice also coordinated a deal agreement between NBC Universal and Procter & Gamble that launched petside.com a web site catering to the pet industry.

== Book publishing career ==
In 2006, Frank and his wife, Vida, co-wrote "Sam Katz on the Loose" a pop-up children's book illustrated by Charles Fazzino and published by Random House.

== Music ==
Radice is a musician, songwriter and composer. During his early years, he sang and played guitar in several rock and blues bands including The Righteous Brothers, Peaches & Herb, The Phil Flowers Band and Sideshow. Later in his career, Radice co-wrote the “America’s First Family” theme, and was Executive Producer of the Emmy nominated “Live For Today” and "Why I Love Today" themes, all for NBC’s Today Show.

In 2008, Frank worked with the legendary composer and producer, David Foster, and "Band from TV", on 2 cuts for the CD release of the music from the hit television series House M.D. with proceeds benefiting various charities on the House M.D. Original Television Soundtrack.

== Sources ==
- Motion Pictures
- Nexttv | Programming| Business | Multichannel Broadcasting + Cable | www.nexttv.com
- Where on the Web Is Matt Lauer?
- To Promote a Cable Network, a Plan to Inundate the Internet
