= Criticism of Mozilla Corporation =

The Mozilla Corporation, the for-profit subsidiary of the Mozilla Foundation, has been involved in a range of controversies.

== Relationship with Google ==
The Mozilla Corporation's relationship with Google, particularly with respect to their paid referral agreement, has been a subject of discussion in the media. In March 2006, Jason Calacanis reported a rumor on his blog that Mozilla Corporation gained $72M during the previous year, primarily for the Firefox browser's use of Google in its search box. The rumor was later addressed by Christopher Blizzard, then a member of the board, who wrote on his blog that,

"it's not correct, though not off by an order of magnitude."

Two years later, TechCrunch wrote:

"In return for setting Google as the default search engine on Firefox, Google pays Mozilla a substantial sum – in 2006, the total amounted to around $57 million, or 85% of the company's total revenue. The deal was originally going to expire in 2006, but was later extended to 2008 and then ran through 2011."

The deal was extended until November 2014. Under the deal, Mozilla was to have received from Google another $900 million ($300 million annually), nearly 3 times the previous amount. The partnership to use Google as the default search engine was resumed after a three-year hiatus in 2017.

The 2007 release of the anti-phishing protection in Firefox 2 raised controversy. Anti-phishing protection, which was enabled by default, is based on a list updated twice hourly from Google's servers. The browser also sends a cookie with each update request. Internet privacy advocacy groups have expressed concerns surrounding Google's possible uses for this data, especially since Firefox's privacy policy states that Google may share (non-personally identifying) information gathered through safe browsing with third parties, including business partners.

Mozilla's original deal with Google to have Google Search as the default web search engine in the browser expired in 2011, but a new deal was struck, where Google agreed to pay Mozilla just under a billion dollars over three years until 2017 in exchange for keeping Google as its default search engine.

The price was driven up due to aggressive bidding from Microsoft's Bing and Yahoo!'s presence in the auction as well. Despite the deal, Mozilla Firefox maintains relationships with Bing, Yahoo!, Yandex, Baidu, Amazon.com and eBay. The partnership with Google was renewed in 2017 and remains active as of 2022.

Following Google CEO Eric Schmidt's comments in December 2009 regarding privacy during a CNBC show, Asa Dotzler, Mozilla's director of community development suggested that users use the Bing search engine instead of Google search. Google also promoted Firefox through YouTube until the release of Google Chrome.

In 2022, 81% of Mozilla's revenues were derived from Google.

In 2024, the U.S. Department of Justice proposed antitrust remedies that could impact Google's ability to maintain default search engine agreements, including its deal with Mozilla. Mozilla expressed concerns that such measures might inadvertently harm independent browser developers without significantly enhancing search competition.

== Brendan Eich ==
In March 2014, the Mozilla Corporation came under criticism after it appointed its chief technical officer Brendan Eich, co-founder of the Mozilla project, the Mozilla Corporation and the Mozilla Foundation, as its new chief executive officer (CEO). In 2008, Eich had made a $1,000 contribution in support of California Proposition 8, a ballot initiative that barred legal recognition of same-sex marriages in California.

Three of six Mozilla Corporation board members reportedly resigned over the choice of CEO, though Mozilla said the resigning board members had "a variety of reasons" and reasserted its continued commitment to LGBT equality, including same-sex marriage.

On April 1, the online dating site OkCupid started displaying visitors using Mozilla Firefox a message urging them to switch to a different web browser, pointing out that 8% of the matches made on OkCupid are between same-sex couples.

On April 3, Mozilla announced that Eich had decided to step down as CEO and also leave the board of the Mozilla Foundation. This, in turn, prompted criticism from some commentators who criticized the pressure that led Eich to resign.

For example, Conor Friedersdorf argued in The Atlantic that

"the general practice of punishing people in business for bygone political donations is most likely to entrench powerful interests and weaken the ability of the powerless to challenge the status quo."

== Directory tiles ==
In February 2014, Mozilla released Directory Tiles, which showed Firefox users advertisements based on the users' browser history, which was opt-in by default. This feature was controversial and prompted Mozilla to cancel the feature in December 2015.

== Looking Glass add-on ==
On December 15, 2017, Mozilla installed an add-on in all Firefox Quantum browsers, titled "Looking Glass," with the description, "MY REALITY IS JUST DIFFERENT THAN YOURS," after a collaboration of Mozilla and the television show Mr. Robot. Mozilla received some criticism, as the add-on was installed without the user's knowledge or consent. On December 18, Mozilla issued an apology for the installation of the extension and released the source code of the add-on.

== Cliqz search engine ==
In October 2017, Mozilla launched an experimental add-on using Cliqz technology to "less than one percent of users in Germany installing Firefox." Cliqz recommended results based on the user's browser history, which drew criticism from users.

== Push notifications for Mozilla Blog without user consent ==
In July 2020 Mozilla forced push notifications, an advertisement for its own blog post about Facebook and Mozilla's #StopHateForProfit campaign. These notifications were sent without user consent and faced a backlash by Firefox users.

== Federal labor charges ==
In January 2025, Mozilla settled charges from the US National Labor Relations Board that the company had refused to hire #AppleToo activist and software engineer Cher Scarlett for her prior labor advocacy in 2021. They agreed to pay $300,000 in lost benefits and wages and to post a notification of rights, a promise not to retaliate, and of the settlement to employees. The charge was filed by Scarlett in 2022 and prosecuted in 2023.

== Mozilla Monitor - OneRep partnership ==
Mozilla Monitor partners with OneRep to issue data removal requests from online directories and data aggregators.

On March 14, 2024, an investigation by Krebs on Security revealed that OneRep's founder had also founded multiple people-search companies in the past. In response, Mozilla responded in a statement to Krebs on Security

"We were aware of the past affiliations with the entities named in the article and were assured they had ended before our work together. We're now looking into this further. We will always put the privacy and security of our customers first and will provide updates as needed."

Following up on their statement shortly after, Mozilla's vice president of communications told The Verge that it had ended the partnership with OneRep.

In February 2025, Krebs on Security found that Mozilla was still using and promoting OneRep.

== Discrimination lawsuit ==
In June 2024, Steve Teixeira, who was the chief product officer of Mozilla Corporation, filed a lawsuit against the company. Teixeira alleges that he faced discrimination and retaliation by Mozilla after taking three months off to receive cancer treatment, and that

"immediately upon his return, Mozilla campaigned to demote or terminate Mr. Teixeira, citing groundless concerns and assumptions about his capabilities as an individual living with cancer."

The lawsuit was settled in December 2025.

== NOYB complaint ==
In September 2024, NOYB filed a complaint with the Austrian Data Protection Authority against Mozilla after enabling an experimental feature called "Privacy Preserving Attribution" in Firefox. The feature, designed to "allow ad performance to be measured without individual websites collecting personal data" was accused of tracking users without consent and infringing on the GDPR.

== Terms of Use and Privacy Policy changes ==
In 2025, Mozilla received criticism after changes to the Firefox Terms of Use.

The criticism was centered around a clause that gave Mozilla a "nonexclusive, royalty-free, worldwide license" to use any information that was uploaded or inputted into the browser. The new terms were perceived to reduce privacy, and were seen to be connected to AI, while Mozilla denied that these were the motives.

Criticism centered on fears that the license grant covered all data inputted, while Mozilla responded saying that the change "does NOT give us ownership of your data".

In response, Mozilla said that many modified words were to ease readability, increase transparency, formalise existing implicit agreements, and describe the circumstances of a free browser, adding that the AI features are covered by a separate agreement.

Days later, Mozilla changed the wording of their privacy FAQ, removing a pledge to never "sell your personal data" and revising another section denying allegations that it sold user data, saying that it gathers some information from hideable advertisements as well as chatbot metadata when interacted with, and that the legal definition of "sell" was vague in some jurisdictions.

== See also ==
- Criticism of Apple Inc.
- Criticism of Google
- Criticism of Microsoft
