= AI-assisted targeting in the Gaza Strip =

Use of AI by the Israel Defense Forces in the Gaza war

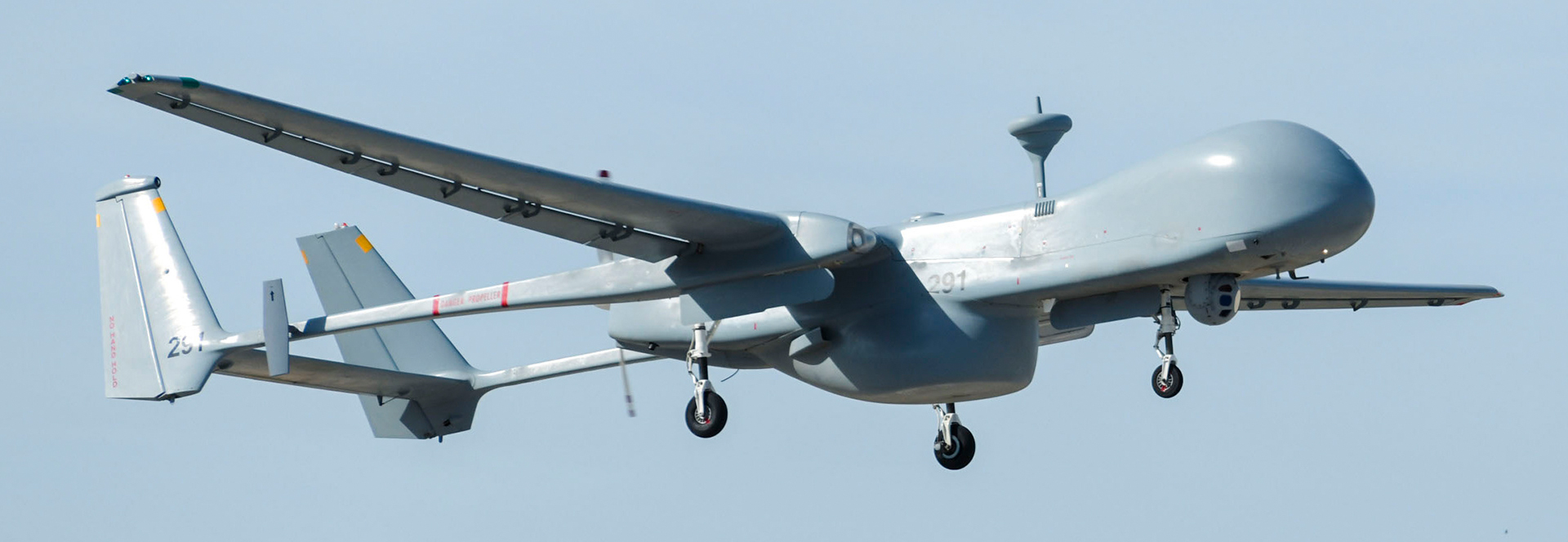
Israeli military drone IAI Heron, used to monitor, target and bomb buildings or individuals

As part of the Gaza war, the Israel Defense Forces (IDF) have used artificial intelligence (AI) to rapidly and automatically determine who and what to bomb. Israel has greatly expanded the bombing of the Gaza Strip, which in previous wars had been limited by the Israeli Air Force running out of targets.

These tools include the Gospel, an AI which automatically reviews surveillance data looking for buildings, equipment and people thought to belong to the enemy, and upon finding them, recommends bombing targets to a human analyst who may then decide whether to pass it along to the field. Another is Lavender, an "AI-powered database" which lists tens of thousands of Palestinian men linked by AI to Hamas or Palestinian Islamic Jihad, and which is also used for target recommendation.

Critics and researchers have argued the use of these AI tools puts civilians at risk, blurs accountability, and results in militarily disproportionate violence in violation of international humanitarian law, concretely describing the system's function as "automating civilian harm".

== The Gospel ==
Israel uses an AI system dubbed "Habsora", "the Gospel", to determine which targets the Israeli Air Force would bomb. It automatically provides a targeting recommendation to a human analyst, who decides whether to pass it along to soldiers in the field. The recommendations can be anything from individual fighters, rocket launchers, Hamas command posts, to private homes of suspected Hamas or Islamic Jihad members.

AI can process military intelligence far faster than humans. Retired Lt Gen. Aviv Kohavi, head of the IDF until 2023, stated that the system could produce 100 bombing targets in Gaza a day, with real-time recommendations which ones to attack, where human analysts might produce 50 a year. A lecturer interviewed by NPR estimated these figures as 50–100 targets in 300 days for 20 intelligence officers, and 200 targets within 10–12 days for the Gospel.

=== Technological background ===
The Gospel uses machine learning, where an AI is tasked with identifying commonalities in vast amounts of data (e.g. scans of cancerous tissue, photos of a facial expression, surveillance of Hamas members identified by human analysts), then looking for those commonalities in new material.

What information the Gospel uses is not known, but it is thought (Note: The Guardian, citing unnamed experts, wrote that "AI-based decision support systems for targeting" would typically "analyse large sets of information from a range of sources, such as drone footage, intercepted communications, surveillance data," and "movements and behaviour patterns of individuals and large groups." NPR cited Blaise Misztal of the Jewish Institute for National Security of America as saying the data likely comes from a wide variety of sources, including such things as cellphone messages, satellite imagery, drone footage and seismic sensors. The data is aggregated and classified by other AI systems before being fed into the Gospel.) to combine surveillance data from diverse sources in enormous amounts.

Recommendations are based on pattern-matching. A person with enough similarities to other people labeled as enemy combatants may be labelled a combatant themselves.

Regarding the suitability of AIs for the task, NPR cited Heidy Khlaaf, engineering director of AI Assurance at the technology security firm Trail of Bits, as saying "AI algorithms are notoriously flawed with high error rates observed across applications that require precision, accuracy, and safety." Bianca Baggiarini, lecturer at the Australian National University's Strategic and Defence Studies Centre wrote AIs are "more effective in predictable environments where concepts are objective, reasonably stable, and internally consistent." She contrasted this with telling the difference between a combatant and non-combatant, which even humans frequently can't do.

Khlaaf went on to point out that such a system's decisions depend entirely on the data it's trained on, (Note: It's well-known in the field that an AI imitating the decisions of humans may imitate their mistakes and prejudices, resulting in what's known as algorithmic bias.) and are not based on reasoning, factual evidence or causation, but solely on statistical probability.

=== Operation ===
The IAF ran out of targets to strike in the 2014 war and 2021 crisis. In an interview on France 24, investigative journalist Yuval Abraham of +972 Magazine stated that to maintain military pressure, and due to political pressure to continue the war, the military would bomb the same places twice. Since then, the integration of AI tools has significantly sped up the selection of targets. In early November, the IDF stated more than 12,000 targets in Gaza had been identified by the target administration division that uses the Gospel. NPR wrote on December 14 that it was unclear how many targets from the Gospel had been acted upon, but that the Israeli military said it was currently striking as many as 250 targets a day. The bombing, too, has intensified to what the December 14 article called an astonishing pace: the Israeli military stated at the time it had struck more than 22,000 targets inside Gaza, at a daily rate more than double that of the 2021 conflict, more than 3,500 of them since the collapse of the truce on December 1. Early in the offensive the head of the Air Force stated his forces only struck military targets, but added: "We are not being surgical."

Once a recommendation is accepted, another AI, Fire Factory, cuts assembling the attack down from hours to minutes by calculating munition loads, prioritizing and assigning targets to aircraft and drones, and proposing a schedule, according to a pre-war Bloomberg article that described such AI tools as tailored for a military confrontation and proxy war with Iran.

One change that The Guardian noted is that since senior Hamas leaders disappear into tunnels at the start of an offensive, systems such as the Gospel have allowed the IDF to locate and attack a much larger pool of more junior Hamas operatives. It cited an official who worked on targeting decisions in previous Gaza operations as saying that while the homes of junior Hamas members had previously not been targeted for bombing, the official believes the houses of suspected Hamas operatives were now targeted regardless of rank. In the France 24 interview, Abraham, of +972 Magazine, characterized this as enabling the systematization of dropping a 2000 lb bomb into a home to kill one person and everybody around them, something that had previously been done to a very small group of senior Hamas leaders. NPR cited a report by +972 Magazine and its sister publication Local Call as asserting the system is being used to manufacture targets so that Israeli military forces can continue to bombard Gaza at an enormous rate, punishing the general Palestinian population. NPR noted it had not verified this; it was unclear how many targets are being generated by AI alone, but there had been a substantial increase in targeting, with an enormous civilian toll.

In principle, the combination of a computer's speed to identify opportunities and a human's judgment to evaluate them can enable more precise attacks and fewer civilian casualties. Israeli military and media have emphasized this capacity to minimize harm to non-combatants. Richard Moyes, researcher and head of the NGO Article 36, pointed to "the widespread flattening of an urban area with heavy explosive weapons" to question these claims, while Lucy Suchman, professor emeritus at Lancaster University, described the bombing as "aimed at maximum devastation of the Gaza Strip".

The Guardian wrote that when a strike was authorized on private homes of those identified as Hamas or Islamic Jihad operatives, target researchers knew in advance the expected number of civilians killed, each target had a file containing a collateral damage score stipulating how many civilians were likely to be killed in a strike, and according to a senior Israeli military source, operatives use a "very accurate" measurement of the rate of civilians evacuating a building shortly before a strike. "We use an algorithm to evaluate how many civilians are remaining. It gives us a green, yellow, red, like a traffic signal."

==== 2021 use ====
Kohavi compared the target division using the Gospel to a machine and stated that once the machine was activated in the war of May 2021, it generated 100 targets a day, with half of them being attacked, in contrast with 50 targets in Gaza per year beforehand. Approximately 200 targets came from the Gospel out of the 1,500 targets Israel struck in Gaza in the war, including both static and moving targets according to the military.

The Jewish Institute for National Security of America's after action report identified an issue, stating the system had data on what was a target, but lacked data on what wasn't. The system depends entirely on training data, and intel that human analysts had examined and deemed didn't constitute a target had been discarded, risking bias. The vice president expressed his hopes this had since been rectified.

=== Organization ===
The Gospel is used by the military's target administration division (or Directorate of Targets or Targeting Directorate), which was formed in 2019 in the IDF's intelligence directorate to address the air force running out of targets to bomb, and which Kohavi described as "powered by AI capabilities" and including hundreds of officers of soldiers. In addition to its wartime role, The Guardian wrote it'd helped the IDF build a database of between 30,000 and 40,000 suspected militants in recent years, and that systems such as the Gospel had played a critical role in building lists of individuals authorized to be assassinated.

The Gospel was developed by Unit 8200 of the Israeli Intelligence Corps.

== Server in the Sky (SITS) ==
According to internal Israel Defense Forces (IDF) documents obtained by Haaretz in 2026, the military deployed an artificial intelligence-based system known as Server in the Sky (SITS) across its fleet of Hermes 450 and Hermes 900 unmanned aerial vehicles. The system consists of onboard analytics software running on computers installed within the drones and is designed to process intelligence gathered by sensors and cameras in real time. According to the documents, SITS automatically analyzes collected data, detects and classifies targets, determines whether information should be relayed to command centers, air force personnel, or ground forces, and provides automated analytical capabilities for operational missions. The system also enables autonomous management of drone fleets by transferring surveillance and tracking tasks between aircraft when one drone loses visual contact with a target or is forced to evade threats.

Haaretz reported that these capabilities were employed extensively during the war in Gaza, where Hermes drones were deployed on an unprecedented scale following the 7 October 2023 attacks and their flight hours increased fivefold. The report states that the drones conducted intelligence-gathering and strike missions over Gaza and Lebanon, using computer vision to identify, classify, map, and share targets with Israeli forces in real time. The report further stated that intelligence-gathering and strike drones equipped with these capabilities later operated over Iran and other theaters. The documents also describe the integration of the Wide Area Persistent Surveillance (WAPS) system, which uses ten electro-optical cameras to monitor up to 80 square kilometres from a single aircraft and allows analysts to reconstruct events through archived imagery. In addition, the Spectro system was integrated with SITS aboard Hermes 900 drones to detect and track hostile drones approaching from Lebanon and Syria.

== Lavender ==
The Guardian defined Lavender as an AI-powered database, according to six intelligence officers' testimonies given to +972 Magazine/Local Call and shared with The Guardian. The six said Lavender had played a central role in the war, rapidly processing data to identify potential junior operatives to target, at one point listing as many as 37,000 Palestinian men linked by AI to Hamas or PIJ. The details of Lavender's operation or how it comes to its conclusions are not included in accounts published by +972/Local Call, but after a sample of the list was found to have a 90% accuracy rate, the IDF approved Lavender's sweeping use for recommending targets. According to the officers, it was used alongside the Gospel, which targeted buildings and structures instead of individuals.

Citing multiple sources, The Guardian wrote that in previous wars, identifying someone as a legitimate target would be discussed and then signed off by a legal adviser, and that, after 7 October, the process was dramatically accelerated, there was pressure for more targets, and to meet the demand, the IDF came to rely heavily on Lavender for a database of individuals judged to have the characteristics of a PIJ or Hamas militant. The Guardian quoted one source: "I would invest 20 seconds for each target at this stage, and do dozens of them every day. I had zero added-value as a human, apart from being a stamp of approval. It saved a lot of time." A source who justified the use of Lavender to help identify low-ranking targets said that in wartime there's no time to carefully go through the identification process with every target, and rather than invest manpower and time in a junior militant "you're willing to take the margin of error of using artificial intelligence."

The IDF issued a statement that some of the claims portrayed are baseless while others reflect a flawed understanding of IDF directives and international law, and that the IDF does not use an AI system that identifies terrorist operatives or tries to predict whether a person is a terrorist. Instead, it claims information systems are merely one of the types of tools that help analysts gather and optimally analyze intelligence from various sources for the process of identifying military targets, and according to IDF directives, analysts must conduct independent examinations to verify that the targets meet the relevant definitions in accordance with international law and the additional restrictions of the IDF directives.

The statement went on to say the "system" in question is not a system, nor a list of confirmed military operatives eligible to attack, only a database to cross-reference intelligence sources in order to produce up-to-date layers of information on the military operatives of terrorist organizations.

== Ethical and legal ramifications ==
Experts in ethics, AI, and international humanitarian law have criticized the use of such AI systems along ethical and legal lines, arguing that they violate basic principles of international humanitarian law, such as military necessity, proportionality, and the distinction between combatants and civilians.

=== Allegations of bombing homes ===
The Guardian cited the intelligence officers' testimonies published by +972 and Local Call as saying Palestinian men linked to Hamas's military wing were considered potential targets regardless of rank or importance, and low-ranking Hamas and PLJ members would be preferentially targeted at home, with one saying the system was built to look for them in these situations when attacking would be much easier. Two of the sources said attacks on low-ranking militants were typically carried out with dumb bombs, destroying entire homes and killing everyone there, with one saying you don't want to waste expensive bombs that are in short supply on unimportant people. Citing unnamed conflict experts, The Guardian wrote that if Israel has been using dumb bombs to flatten the homes of thousands of Palestinians who were linked with AI assistance to militant groups in Gaza, it could help explain what the newspaper called the shockingly high death toll of the war. An Israeli official speaking to +972 stated also that the Israeli program "Where's Daddy?" tracked suspected militants until they returned home, at which point "the IDF bombed them in homes without hesitation, as a first option. It's much easier to bomb a family's home."

The IDF's response to the publication of the testimonies said that unlike Hamas, it is committed to international law and only strikes military targets and military operatives, does so in accordance to proportionality and precautions, and thoroughly examines and investigates exceptions; that a member of an organized armed group or a direct participant in hostilities is a lawful target under international humanitarian law and the policy of all law-abiding countries; that it "makes various efforts to reduce harm to civilians to the extent feasible in the operational circumstances ruling at the time of the strike"; that it chooses the proper munition in accordance with operational and humanitarian considerations; that aerial munitions without an integrated precision-guide kit are developed militaries' standard weaponry; that onboard aircraft systems used by trained pilots ensure high precision of such weapons; and that the clear majority of munitions it uses are precision-guided.

Family homes were also hit in Southern Lebanon, in a residential area of Bint Jbeil, killing two brothers, Ali Ahmed Bazzi and Ibrahim Bazzi, and Ibrahim's wife Shorouq Hammond. The brothers were both Australian citizens; Ali lived locally but Ibrahim was visiting from Sydney to bring his wife home to Australia. Hezbollah claimed Ali as one of their fighters, and also included the civilian family members in a Hezbollah funeral.

=== Allegations of pre-authorised civilian kill limits ===
According to the testimonies, the IDF imposed pre-authorised limits on how many civilians it permitted killing in order to kill one Hamas militant. The Guardian cited +972 and Local Call on how this number was over 100 for top-ranking Hamas officials, with one of the sources saying there was a calculation for how many civilians could be killed for a brigade commander, how many for a battalion commander, and so on. One of the officers said that for junior militants, this number was 15 on the first week of the war, and at one point was as low as five. Another said it had been as high as 20 uninvolved civilians for one operative, regardless of rank, military importance, or age. The Guardian wrote that experts in international humanitarian law who spoke to the newspaper expressed alarm.

The IDF's response said that IDF procedures require assessing the anticipated military advantage and collateral damage for each target, that such assessments are made individually, not categorically, that the EDF doesn't carry out strikes when the collateral damage is excessive relative to the military advantage, and that the IDF outright rejects the claim regarding any policy to kill tens of thousands of people in their homes.

=== Limits of human review ===
The Guardian cited Moyes as saying a commander who's handed a computer-generated list of targets may not know how the list was generated or be able to question the targeting recommendations, and is in danger of losing the ability to meaningfully consider the risk of civilian harm.

In an opinion piece in Le Monde, reporter Élise Vincent wrote that automated weapons are divided into fully automated systems, which aren't really on the market, and lethal autonomous weapons, which in principle allow human control, and that this division allows Israel to claim the Gospel falls on the side of the more appropriate use of force. She cited Laure de Roucy-Rochegonde, a researcher at Institut français des relations internationales, as saying the war could obsolete these blurred categories and invigorate a stricter regulatory definition, significant human control, which human rights activists including Article 36 have been trying to advocate. She quoted de Roucy-Rochegonde as saying it's not known what kind of algorithm the Israeli army uses, or how the data has been aggregated, which wouldn't be a problem if they didn't lead to a life-or-death decision.

=== Diligence ===
Dr. Marta Bo, researcher at the Stockholm International Peace Research Institute, noted that the humans in human-in-the-loop risk "automation bias": overreliance on systems, giving those systems too much influence over decisions that need to be made by humans.

Suchman observed that the huge volume of targets is likely putting pressure on the human reviewers, saying that "in the face of this kind of acceleration, those reviews become more and more constrained in terms of what kind of judgment people can actually exercise." Tal Mimran, lecturer at Hebrew University in Jerusalem who's previously worked with the government on targeting, added that pressure will make analysts more likely to accept the AI's targeting recommendations, whether they are correct, and they may be tempted to make life easier for themselves by going along with the machine's recommendations, which could create a "whole new level of problems" if the machine is systematically misidentifying targets.

=== Accountability ===
Khlaaf noted the difficulty of pursuing accountability when AI is involved. Humans are still legally culpable, but since AI systems currently lack explainability, targeting system failures can't be traced to any one mistake by one person. It's unclear who would be responsible for such a failure. Khlaaf asks: "Is it the analyst who accepted the AI recommendation? The programmers who made the system? The intelligence officers who gathered the training data?"

== Reactions ==
United Nations Secretary-General, Antonio Guterres, said he was "deeply troubled" by reports that Israel used artificial intelligence in its military campaign in Gaza, saying the practice puts civilians at risk and blurs accountability. Speaking about the Lavender system, Marc Owen Jones, a professor at Hamad Bin Khalifa University stated, "Let's be clear: This is an AI-assisted genocide, and going forward, there needs to be a call for a moratorium on the use of AI in the war". Ben Saul, a United Nations special rapporteur, stated that if reports about Israel's use of AI were true, then "many Israeli strikes in Gaza would constitute the war crimes of launching disproportionate attacks". Ramesh Srinivasan, a professor at UCLA, stated, "Corporate America Big Tech is actually aligned with many of the Israeli military's actions. The fact that AI systems are being used indicates there's a lack of regard by the Israeli state. Everybody knows these AI systems will make mistakes."

Microsoft was criticized by activists and its own employees for providing Microsoft Azure computing services to Unit 8200 and other Israeli government organizations. Microsoft opened an inquiry into IDF use of its services after The Guardian reported the use of phone call data collected from mass surveillance in Gaza and the West Bank to identify bombing targets – which conflicted with Microsoft's terms of service. In September 2025, Microsoft ended Unit 8200's access to its Azure services.

== See also ==
- Intelligence, surveillance, target acquisition, and reconnaissance
- Lethal autonomous weapon
- Project Maven
- Project Nimbus
- AI Warfare
