= List of companies involved in the Gaza war =

The following list documents of companies and corporations involved in supplying weapons, technology, logistical and financial support to Israel during the Gaza war. These companies provide a range of products and services, from advanced fighter jets, drones, and bombs to cloud computing, surveillance, and military logistics. Their products, services, or infrastructure have been used extensively in military operations in Gaza resulting in mass civilian casualties, widespread destruction that amount to war crimes, and genocide.

In 2025, technology giants Alphabet, Amazon, Microsoft, and IBM were named as "central to Israel's surveillance apparatus and the ongoing Gaza destruction" by the UN Human Rights Council.

== Companies ==
Company	Country	Activity
Allianz	Germany	Allianz subsidiary PIMCO has purchased almost $1 billion in Israeli government bonds since the October 7 attacks. A June 2025 UN expert report said that Allianz was enabling "genocide" through its investments.
Amazon	United States	Amazon provides AWS cloud computing services to the Israeli military through Project Nimbus. Amazon's servers are used to store surveillance intelligence on Gaza's population. They have also provided targeting information used in airstrikes that killed civilians. According to a +972 Magazine investigation, intelligence stored on AWS "was used in a number of cases to provide 'supplementary information' ahead of airstrikes against suspected military operatives, some of which killed many civilians." This information "even helped on rare occasions to confirm aerial assassination strikes in Gaza — strikes that would have also killed and harmed Palestinian civilians." In June 2025, Amazon was named by a UN expert report as one of several companies "central to Israel's surveillance apparatus and the ongoing Gaza destruction." In late October 2025, The Intercept reported that Amazon sold cloud compute services to Israeli weapons manufacturers, as well as Israel's nuclear program and administrative offices that support the occupation of the West Bank.
Atlas Air	United States	Atlas Air, one of the world's largest cargo airlines, has been directly involved in transporting military equipment from the United States to Israel during the Gaza war. The company was contracted by the U.S. Department of Defense for air charter services, and flight tracking data confirms that Atlas Air operated multiple cargo flights to Israel's Nevatim Air Base, carrying materials that activists and analysts identify as weapons, bombs, and other military supplies used in the bombardment of Gaza.
BAE Systems	United Kingdom	BAE Systems produces at least 15% of the components of the F-35I used by the IAF. BAE also produces electronic missile launch systems and various components for Israel's F-15, F-16, and F-35 fighter jets — aircraft that the Israeli Air Force has used extensively in all of its attacks on Gaza
Barclays	United Kingdom	According to a 2024 report by War on Want, Barclays has significantly increased its financial support to arms companies supplying weapons and military technology to Israel, raising its involvement by 55% since 2021. The bank holds over £2 billion in shares and provides £6.1 billion in loans and underwriting to nine such companies. Additionally, the report cited research from December 2023 that found that Barclays is Europe's sixth-largest creditor of firms operating in illegal Israeli settlements in the occupied West Bank. Barclays has denied investing its own money in weapons companies, stating that it only invests its clients' money and has affirmed its continued commitment to the State of Israel.
BlackRock	United States	BlackRock is a key institutional investor in Israeli bonds and major defense, tech, and infrastructure firms directly tied to the siege and destruction of Gaza. Specifically, BlackRock is among the largest institutional shareholders in companies such as Lockheed Martin, Caterpillar, Palantir, Microsoft, Amazon, Alphabet Inc. (Google), and IBM, whose products and systems are used in demolitions, surveillance, and military attacks against Palestinian civilians.
Boeing	United States	Boeing expedited delivery of Joint Direct Attack Munition kits to Israel in the aftermath of the October 7 attacks. Israel has used the Boeing manufactured GBU-39 Small Diameter Bomb during the Gaza war, including in bombings of a Rafah refugee tent camp, the Al-Sardi school, the Al-Tabaeen school, and the Fahmi al-Jarjawi School.
Boston Consulting Group	United States	Boston Consulting Group helped design and run the business operations of the Gaza Humanitarian Foundation and provided modeling work on the postwar reconstruction of Gaza, including cost estimates for giving hundreds of thousands of Gazans 'relocation packages' worth $9,000 per person in exchange for them leaving the territory.
Caterpillar	United States	For decades, Caterpillar has supplied Israel with D9 armored bulldozers, which the Israeli military has used extensively in operations across Palestine. These bulldozers, up-armored and some converted for remote-controlled use, have played a central role in demolishing homes, infrastructure, and cultural sites, actions that human rights organizations say may constitute war crimes. The equipment has also been used to create buffer zones and build roads—such as the Netzarim Corridor—facilitating long-term Israeli military control in Gaza. Despite calls from human rights groups like Human Rights Watch to halt sales, Caterpillar has maintained that it cannot control how its products are used after purchase. In June 2025, a UN expert report named Caterpillar as a supplier of equipment being used to destroy property in the Palestinian territories.
Cellebrite	Israel	The Israel military has used Cellebrite software to access data from the phones of Palestinians detained during the war. Cellebrite was also reportedly involved in a project to map tunnels in Gaza.
Cisco	United States	The Israeli Ministry of Defense has had contracts to purchase Cisco servers and technology for years, being one of the main contractors for networking hardware for the Israeli military. In 2023, despite being replaced as the main server provider for the army in favour for Dell, contracts continued.
Chevron	United States	Chevron has played a significant role in the exploitation of natural gas resources in the Eastern Mediterranean, including the Leviathan and Tamar fields off Israel's coast. The company has financially benefited from Israel's control over maritime resources to which Palestinians have been denied access due to the blockade of Gaza and lack of maritime sovereignty.
Day & Zimmermann	United States	Day & Zimmermann manufactures M830A1 rounds for the United States Army. During the Gaza war, 14,000 of these rounds were transferred from the US Army's stockpile to the Israeli military.
DJI	China	According to an investigation by Al Jazeera, the Israeli military utilized retrofitted DJI drones, especially its Agras model, in the Gaza War to attack civilian shelters and hospitals, as well as monitoring Palestinian prisoners being used as human shields. The Israel Defense Forces used several DJI models such as the Agras, Avata, and Mavic during the war for various purposes, including surveillance and dropping bombs. Unlike its actions during the Russian invasion of Ukraine, DJI has yet to halt the sales of DJI drones to Israel.
Elbit Systems	Israel	Elbit Systems, Israel's largest weapons manufacturer, is a major supplier of arms and surveillance technology to the Israeli military. Its drones (Hermes and Skylark), MPR 500 bombs, and advanced targeting systems have been heavily used in Gaza, the West Bank, and Lebanon. These systems, designed for urban warfare, were used in attacks like the 2024 airstrike in Habbarieh, Lebanon killing seven civilians, and the World Central Kitchen aid convoy attack in Gaza, both considered as potential war crimes. Elbit also played a key role in developing Israel's "smart" Gaza border wall. On October 13, the Israeli military fired 120mm tank rounds at journalists in southern Lebanon, killing Reuters journalist Issam Abdallah and injuring six others.
FANUC	Japan	The FANUC Corporation provides industrial robots for weapons production lines. They supply Israel Aerospace Industries, Elbit Systems and Lockheed Martin.
General Dynamics	United States	General Dynamics manufactures Mark 84 bombs, 14,000 of which have been sent to Israel by the US and used as the primary 2,000-pound bombs. They are the only company that produces the shells for the Mark 80 series of bombs. The 2,000-pound bomb is extremely destructive and cannot be used in populated areas without causing major civilian casualties. Its blast kills instantly within 100 feet and spreads lethal fragments up to 1,200 feet. Israel reportedly dropped over 500 such bombs on Northern Gaza by November 6, including a deadly strike on Jabalia refugee camp. By mid-November, over 208 were dropped in Southern Gaza, even in areas designated as safe zones. Attacks on families in Deir al-Balah have been labeled by Amnesty International and the UN as potential war crimes. General Dynamics CFO, Jason Aiken, said, "I think if you look at the incremental demand potential coming out of that, (Note: "the attacks on Gaza") the biggest one to highlight and that really sticks out is probably on the artillery side."
Glencore	Switzerland	Glencore is a major supplier of coal and other fossil fuels to Israel. According to the UN report, its subsidiaries provided roughly 15% of Israel's imported coal between October 2023 and 2024.
Google	United States	In 2021, Google and Amazon secured a $1.2 billion contract with the Israeli government for Project Nimbus, a cloud-computing initiative. Internal Google documents obtained by journalist Sam Biddle revealed that Google provides Israel with advanced AI capabilities, including facial detection, automated image categorization, object tracking, and sentiment analysis of images, speech, and text. In late 2023, Google granted the Israeli Ministry of Defense expanded access to its AI platform Vertex, and in March 2024, the Israeli military signed a direct consulting deal with Google to further extend its use of Google Cloud services. Throughout 2024, Google fulfilled additional requests from the Israeli military, including access to the Gemini generative AI model and Google Photos' facial recognition tools, reportedly used for mass surveillance of Palestinians in Gaza. These services were provided under special contracts that excluded Google's standard terms of use, granting Israel full discretion over the technology. In April 2024, Google fired over 50 employees who protested the company's involvement in Israel's military activities. In February 2025, Alphabet, Google's parent company, lifted its ban on using AI for military purposes. In June 2025, Google/Alphabet was named by a UN expert report as one of several companies "central to Israel's surveillance apparatus and the ongoing Gaza destruction."
HD Hyundai	South Korea	HD Hyundai was alleged by a June 2025 UN expert's report to have provided heavy machinery that has been used to destroy property in Palestinian territories.
Hewlett Packard Enterprise	United States	Hewlett Packard Enterprise provides servers to the Israeli government's Immigration and Population Authority.
Honeywell	United States	One of the fragments found in the aftermath of the Al-Sardi school attack was an inertial measurement unit manufactured by Honeywell.
HP	United States	HP provides technology and hardware to the Israeli military, government and police.
IBM	United States	In June 2025, IBM was named by a UN expert report as one of several companies "central to Israel's surveillance apparatus and the ongoing Gaza destruction."
Israel Aerospace Industries	Israel	Israel Aerospace Industries (IAI), a major state-owned weapons manufacturer, supplies key military systems to the Israeli military, including the Heron TP killer drone used in Gaza strikes and the Zibar tactical vehicle for elite units. On a Nov. 22 call with investors, IAI CEO, Boaz Levy, said that Heron drones have "played a pivotal role" in Israel's attacks on Gaza, including in strike operations.
Leonardo	Italy	Leonardo was alleged by a June 2025 UN expert's report to have provided weaponry to be used in Gaza.
Lockheed Martin	United States	Lockheed Martin produces and supplies the Israeli Air Force (IAF) with the F-35I, a special F-35 variant. The F-35I has been used for airstrikes in Gaza and typically carries 2 GBU-31(V)1 JDAM bombs, which have been dropped on hospitals. F-35Is were also used in the strike on the Al-Mawasi humanitarian zone, which killed at least 19 people. Lockheed Martin has highlighted the conflicts in Israel and Ukraine as potential opportunities for future revenue growth. In June 2025, a UN expert report named Lockheed Martin as allegedly providing weaponry to be used in Gaza.
Maersk	Denmark	Maersk transports components, parts, weapons and raw material and has sustained the flow of US-supplied weapons to Israel.
MBDA	France	MBDA's US subsidiary sells parts to Boeing for the GBU-39 bomb, which has been used in Israeli airstrikes that killed civilians, including children, during the war.
Meta	United States	Israel has used Facebook to advertise for bulldozer drivers needed to destroy civilian infrastructure in Gaza. Dr John Reynolds of Maynooth University said "this could be a form of aiding/facilitating war crimes in violation of international humanitarian law".
Microsoft	United States	The Israeli military has utilized Microsoft's Azure cloud computing platform and AI services during the Gaza war to identify targets. The Israeli Ministry of Defense is Microsoft's second largest military customer. In June 2025, Microsoft was named by a UN expert report as one of several companies "central to Israel's surveillance apparatus and the ongoing Gaza destruction."
Moog Inc.	United States	Moog provides the Primary Flight Control Actuation System, the Leading Edge Flap Drive System and the Wingfold Actuation System for the F-35 fighter, which is used by the Israeli Air Force and was implicated in a number of airstrikes carried out in Gaza resulting in civilian casualties, in particular the Al-Mawasi airstrike. British investigative newspaper Private Eye also alleges that Moog Inc. was one of a number of US arms suppliers using East Midlands Airport as a transit hub for shipments of F-15 and F-16 spare parts from the US to Israel, with peaks in such shipments coinciding with peaks in Israeli air strikes against Gaza, Lebanon and Iran. Moog Wolverhampton also provides the complete Primary Flight Control Actuation system for Israel's Leonardo M-346 fast jet trainer, and its "Flying Tiger" squadron currently operates 30 aircraft at Hatzerim Airbase, the largest fleet of M-346 fast jets in the world which is used to train F-15, F-16 and F-35 pilots.
Oshkosh	United States	Oshkosh Corporation "confirmed that it has sold, and continues to sell, equipment that is used by the [Israeli army] in Gaza". In June 2025, Norwegian pension fund KLP divested from Oshkosh over its role in the war.
Palantir	United States	Palantir Technologies has played a significant role in supporting Israel's military operations during the Gaza war by providing advanced artificial intelligence (AI) and data analysis tools. In January 2024, Palantir expanded its partnership with Israel, supplying new AI-driven technologies specifically to aid the Israeli Defense Ministry in its ongoing campaign in Gaza. Palantir's software has been used to enhance Israel's targeting capabilities that allowed Israel to place three drone-fired missiles into three clearly marked aid vehicles CEO Alex Karp is a strong supporter for Israel, stating, "I am proud that we are supporting Israel in every way we can." Several of Karp's employees chose to resign due to his public support for Israel. In June 2025, Palantir was named by a UN expert report as providing "AI tools" to the IDF, though without specifics on their use.
Rafael Advanced Defense Systems	Israel	Rafael Advanced Defense Systems' Spike Firefly has been used during the Gaza war. Spike missiles were also likely used in the World Central Kitchen aid convoy attack and Rafael's SPICE system was also used in the September 2024 Al-Mawasi refugee camp attack.
Renk	Germany	The Renk Group AG supplies the Renk RK 325 transmission for the Merkava Mark 4 and the Renk RK 304 transmission for the Merkava Mark 2 and 3. The German government approved new exports of these parts in the fall of 2024. In an interview with the Financial Times in August 2025, Renk CEO Alexander Sagel announced that the production of the Merkava transmissions might be relocated to the US to bypass the German export ban on military products that could be used in Gaza that was announced by German chancellor Friedrich Merz.
Rheinmetall	Germany	Rheinmetall and BAE Systems produce 155 mm M109 self-propelled howitzers that the IDF has used to shell densely populated areas in Gaza. Amnesty International also found evidence for the usage of white phosphorus munition in said howitzers.
RTX Corporation	United States	RTX, though its Pratt & Whitney subsidiary, builds engines for the F-35 and F-15I. From October 2023 to July 2025, their stock price increased by 77 percent.
Starlink	United States	In October 2023, the IDF secured access to Starlink, providing critical communication support days after the October 7 attacks. Some reports allege that Starlink's approval for use in Gaza in February 2024 may have supported Israeli military operations, potentially enabling the siege of Al-Shifa Hospital.
Tata Group	India	Its subsidiaries, Jaguar Land Rover, Tata Motors and Tata Advanced Systems have provided weapons and supplies to F-16 fighter jets, AH-64 Apache helicopters as well as to MDT David light armored vehicles that is used for its operations in the West Bank by the Israeli army.
Vanguard	United States	Vanguard has purchased over $500 million in Israeli government bonds since the October 7 attacks. Vanguard was also identified in a UN expert report as one of the largest institutional investors in companies providing arms and support to Israel.
Volkswagen Group	Germany	Volkswagen attempted a partnership with Israel's Rafael Advanced Defense Systems in which Volkswagen would have produced military vehicles and Iron Dome missile components at its Osnabrück plant. The partnership was reportedly blocked by the Qatar Investment Authority, which owns over 10% of Volkswagen shares and over 17% of its voting rights.
Volvo	Sweden	Volvo has supplied heavy machinery, particularly excavators and bulldozers, through licensed dealers that have been used in the demolition of Palestinian homes and infrastructure, including in East Jerusalem and villages like Umm al-Khair, Hebron. Despite Volvo's assertions that these machines were acquired via resellers and intended for civilian use, a UN expert report holds the company materially complicit in supporting "the system of displacement" and warns that passive suppliers become deliberate contributors to occupation practices.
Wieland Group	Germany	Wieland is providing brass ammunition cartridge cases from its Buffalo, New York, factory to the Elbit Systems plant in Israel.
Woodward HRT	United States	Fragments of the GBU-39 found at the site of the Al-Sardi school attack identify Woodward HRT as the vendor of the weapon used in the attack.

== See also ==
- Boycott, Divestment and Sanctions
- List of countries supplying arms to Israel
- Mask Off Maersk
- No Tech for Apartheid
- Project Nimbus
