= Project Nimbus =

Israeli government cloud computing project

Project Nimbus (Hebrew: פרויקט נימבוס) is a controversial Israeli cloud project for which the Israeli government contracted cloud computing, artificial intelligence, and other related services from Google and Amazon. The Jerusalem Post hailed the US$1.2 billion contract as massive project providing thousands of jobs.

The project has drawn rebuke and condemnation from the companies' shareholders as well as their employees over concerns that the project would lead to further abuses of Palestinians' human rights in the context of the ongoing occupation and the Israeli–Palestinian conflict.

== Overview ==
In 2019, the Israeli government was seeking to build cloud services in Israel. Google, Amazon, Microsoft, Oracle and IBM competed for the bid. in April 2021, the Israeli Finance Ministry announced that it contracted Google and Amazon to provide "the government, the defense establishment, and others with an all-encompassing cloud solution." Through a $1.2 billion contract, Google Cloud Platform and Amazon Web Services are used to provide Israeli government agencies with cloud computing services, including artificial intelligence and machine learning. Under the contract, Google and Amazon will establish local cloud sites that will "keep information within Israel's borders under strict security guidelines." The Israeli military and defense apparatus have been stakeholders from the inception of the contract. Moreover, the tech companies are contractually forbidden from denying service to any particular entities of the Israeli government, including its military. or from halting their services due to boycott pressure.

According to a Google spokesperson, the contract is only for workloads related to "finance, healthcare, transportation, and education" and does not deal with highly sensitive or classified information. The Google spokesperson said that all Google Cloud customers must abide by its terms of service which prohibit customers from using its services to violate people's legal rights or engage in violence. However, internal documents from both Google and the Israeli government contradict this claim. Google lawyers were worried that "Google Cloud services could be used for, or linked to, the facilitation of human rights violations, including Israeli activity in the West Bank" at least as early as four months before the Nimbus contract was signed, as a New York Times article reported in December 2024. In 2025, investigative reporting by Yuval Abraham also revealed that, leaked documents from Google showed even before the contract was signed, that Google's lawyers were aware of Project Nimbus potential use in enabling human rights violations in the Gaza Strip and elsewhere. According to The Guardian, the agreements also contained a mechanism for the companies to secretly alert Israel if a country requested access to the Project Nimbus data.

== Mission ==
Although Project Nimbus' specific mission has not yet been revealed, Google Cloud Platform's AI tools give the Israeli military and security services the capability for facial detection, automated image categorization, object tracking and sentiment analysis, which are tools that have previously been used by U.S. Customs and Border Protection for border surveillance.

The Intercept wrote in 2022, that "the former head of Security for Google Enterprise — who now heads Oracle's Israel branch — has publicly argued that one of the goals of Nimbus is preventing the German government from requesting data relating on the Israel Defence Forces for the International Criminal Court".

== Timeline ==
Project Nimbus has four planned phases: the first is purchasing and constructing the cloud infrastructure, the second is crafting government policy for moving operations onto the cloud, the third is moving operations to the cloud, and the fourth is implementing and optimizing cloud operations.

For phase 1, expected to last 2 years Google and Amazon AWS were to build 6 data centers in Israel; until then, data centers in Dublin, Ireland, in 4 cities of teh Netherlands and Frankfurt, Germany were to provide cloud services. For phase 2, KPMG will develop a strategy of moving data. For phase 3 small and medium-sized Israeli companies will help move systems to the cloud. According to Google, the project will run for 7 years, extendable for up to 23 years.

== Opposition in regard to use within Israeli–Palestinian conflict ==
As early as October 2021, the contract drew rebuke and condemnation from the companies' shareholders as well as their employees, over concerns that the project would lead to further abuses of Palestinians' human rights in the context of the ongoing occupation and the Israeli–Palestinian conflict. Specifically, they criticized how they believed the technology could increase surveillance of Palestinians, expand data collection practices, and assist in the expansion of Israeli settlements in the West Bank.

In March 2022, Ariel Koren, who had worked as a marketing manager for Google's educational products and was an outspoken opponent of the project, was given the ultimatum of moving to São Paulo within 17 days or losing her job. In a letter announcing her resignation to her colleagues, Koren stated that she believed the relocation requirement was in response to her advocacy against the project. She filed retaliation complaints with Google's human resources department and the National Labor Relations Board (NLRB), which dismissed her case based on lack of evidence.

In 2022, Jewish Voice for Peace and MPower Change launched a campaign called No Tech for Apartheid – also known as #NoTechForApartheid – opposing the project. More than 200 Google workers joined a protest group named after this campaign, who argue that the relative lack of oversight for the project mean it will likely be used for Israel's war against Hamas.

In March 2024, a Google Cloud software engineer was fired after a video of them shouting "I refuse to build technology that empowers genocide", in reference to Project Nimbus, at a company event went viral. In April, dozens of employees participated in sit-ins at Google's New York & Sunnyvale Headquarters to protest against Google supplying cloud computing software to the Israeli government. Employees occupied the office of Google Cloud chief executive Thomas Kurian. Nine employees were charged with trespassing and 28 were fired. Further terminations brought the total of related staff cuts to 50.

In April 2024, former Google employees fired for protesting with #NoTechForApartheid, citing an article in +972 Magazine, expressed concerns over Israel's current use of AI-assisted targeting in the Gaza Strip: a program named "The Gospel" categorizes buildings as military bases, while programs called "Lavender" and "Where's Daddy?" identify and falsely classify Palestinian civilians as "terrorists" and track their movements for target selection.

== See also ==
- AI-assisted targeting in the Gaza Strip
- List of companies involved in the Gaza war
