= Jedi Blue =

Agreement between Alphabet and Meta

Jedi Blue is an agreement between Alphabet and Meta Platforms that allegedly gave Facebook an illegal advantage in Google's ad auctions in exchange for Facebook's word that it would end its own ad service plans.

== History ==
In 2007 Google purchased DoubleClick and its DoubleClickForPublishers advertising system. Header bidding emerged in 2017 as a new way for purchasers to buy ad space. It allowed advertisers to participate in auctions across multiple ad platforms (such as Google's). Facebook announced plans to become header bidding-compatible. This would allow Facebook advertisers to bypass Google's platform, adding to Facebook's revenues and subtracting from Google's. In 2018, Facebook and Google came to an agreement, leading Facebook to retreat from header bidding that became a focus in the suit.

Multiple U.S. states sued Google in 2020. Details about the agreement were obtained in the course of the lawsuit. In September 2022, a ruling in the case dismissed claims there was collusion between Google and Facebook regarding the matters covered in the agreement.

On March 11, 2022, antitrust regulators opened an investigation into the agreement in the European Union and the United Kingdom, with claims that it undermined competition in the advertising market.

== Agreement ==
According to the draft lawsuit, Facebook agreed to reduce its participation in header bidding in return for "information, speed, and other advantages" that would come from staying with Google. Facebook allegedly would receive a guarantee of 90% of auctions regardless of the bids; 300 ms to bid (vs 160 offered to others), along with the ability to identify 80% of smartphone users and 60% of web users.

== Defendant responses ==
=== Google ===
Google spokesperson Peter Schottenfels said, "Despite Attorney General Paxton's three attempts to re-write his complaint, it is still full of inaccuracies and lacks legal merit ... There is vigorous competition in online advertising, which has reduced ad tech fees, and expanded options for publishers and advertisers."

=== Facebook ===
Meta spokesperson Christopher Sgro said, "Meta's non-exclusive bidding agreement with Google and the similar agreements we have with other bidding platforms, have helped to increase competition for ad placements ... These business relationships enable Meta to deliver more value to advertisers while fairly compensating publishers, resulting in better outcomes for all."
