= Definition 6 =

American Digital Marketing Agency

- Type: Privately held company
- Industry: Digital Marketing, sound design, Animation studio, Post-production
- Predecessor: iXL (1996-2001); Creative Bubble (2001-2011)
- Founded: 1996
- Headquarters: Atlanta, United States of America
- Key people: Jeffrey Katz (CEO) Frank Radice (Expert In Residence) Jason Rockman (President)

DEFINITION 6 is a digital marketing agency that was founded in Atlanta in 1997.

DEFINITION 6 is headquartered in Atlanta and has offices in New York City and London. The agency is backed by Navigation Capital Partners, an Atlanta-based private equity firm. In August 2009, DEFINITION 6 acquired Creative Bubble, a video and post-production and sound engineering company based in New York. In December 2009, DEFINITION 6 acquired Leach Communications, a strategic communications firm based in New York. In September 2012, DEFINITION 6 acquired Synaptic Digital, an earned media and strategic content distributions company. Barry Sikes took over as CEO of DEFINITION 6 from Michael Kogon in 2013. Shortly thereafter former president and COO Jeffrey Katz became COO in 2014. Definition 6 has worked for various global brands. In 2019, they became part of the Dawn portfolio of independent creative agencies.

== Awards ==
- CLIO Gold Interactive Award (CLIO Awards May 2010)
- Advertising Age Small Agency Campaign of the Year for Coca-Cola's "Happiness Machine" (July 2010)

== Former leadership ==
- Jonathan Accarrino (2010-2013) – On June 24, 2010, DEFINITION 6 hired Jonathan Accarrino from NBC Universal, where he was responsible for all social networking promotion, training, and account voice development for on-air and online talent, franchises, and NBC Universal executives.
- Alfred Leach (2009-2012) – DEFINITION 6 acquired PR firm Leach Communications in December 2009.
