= Google phone =

Google phone may refer to:

- Any phone running Google's Android operating system
- The Google Voice telephone service
- Smartphones that were manufactured or co-manufactured with Google, including:
  - Android Dev Phones:
    - HTC Dream, an HTC-manufactured Android developer smartphone, released December 2008
    - HTC Magic, an HTC-manufactured Android developer smartphone, released November 2009
  - Smartphones of the Google Nexus family:
    - Nexus One, an HTC-manufactured smartphone, released January 2010
    - Nexus S, Samsung-manufactured successor to the Nexus One, released December 2010
    - Galaxy Nexus, Samsung-manufactured successor to the Nexus S, released November 2011
    - Nexus 4, LG-manufactured successor to the Galaxy Nexus, released November 2012
    - Nexus 5, LG-manufactured successor to the Nexus 4, released November 2013
    - Nexus 6, Motorola-manufactured successor to the Nexus 5, released November 2014
    - Nexus 5X, LG-manufactured successor to the Nexus 5, released October 2015
    - Nexus 6P, Huawei-manufactured successor to the Nexus 6, released September 2015
  - Smartphones of the Google Pixel family:
    - Pixel, released 2016
    - Pixel 2, released 2017
    - Pixel 3, released 2018
    - Pixel 3a, released 2019
    - Pixel 4, released 2019
    - Pixel 4a, released 2020
    - Pixel 5, released 2020
    - Pixel 5a, released in 2021
    - Pixel 6, released in 2021
    - Pixel 6a, released in 2022
    - Pixel 7, released in 2022
    - Pixel 7a, released 2023
    - Pixel Fold, released 2023
    - Pixel 8 and 8 Pro, released 2023
    - Pixel 8a, released 2024
    - Pixel 9, Pixel 9 Pro, and Pixel 9 Pro XL, released 2024
    - Pixel 9 Pro Fold, released 2024
    - Pixel 9a, released 2025
    - Pixel 10, Pixel 10 Pro, and Pixel 10 Pro XL, released 2025
    - Pixel 10 Pro Fold, released 2025
