= Nokia G310 =

2023 smartphone model

Nokia G310 (T-Mobile)
- Also known as: Nokia G42 (International)
- Brand: Nokia
- Developer: HMD Global
- Type: Smartphone
- Series: Nokia G series
- First released: August 24, 2023
- Availability by region: United States
- Compatible networks: GSM, HSPA, LTE, 5G
- Form factor: Slate
- Color: Blue
- Dimensions: 165.1×75.7×8.6 mm (6.50×2.98×0.34 in)
- Weight: 195.1 g (6.88 oz)
- Operating system: Android 13
- System-on-chip: Qualcomm SM4350-AC Snapdragon 480+ 5G (8 nm)
- CPU: Octa-core (2x2.2 GHz Kryo 460 & 6x1.8 GHz Kryo 460)
- GPU: Adreno 619
- Memory: 4 GB RAM
- Storage: 128 GB
- Removable storage: microSDXC (dedicated slot)
- Battery: Li-Po 5000 mAh (non-removable)
- Charging: 20W wired, PD, QC
- Rear camera: Triple: 50 MP, (wide), AF; 2 MP (macro); Auxiliary lens LED flash, HDR, panorama Video: 1080p@30/60fps
- Front camera: 8 MP, (wide); Video: 1080p@30fps
- Display: 6.56 in (167 mm) IPS LCD, 90Hz; 720 x 1612 pixels, 20:9 ratio (~269 ppi density)
- Sound: Loudspeaker, 3.5mm jack
- Connectivity: Wi-Fi 802.11 b/g/n/ac, Bluetooth 5.1 (A2DP, LE), GPS (L1+L5), USB Type-C 2.0 (OTG)
- Model: TA-1573
- Development status: Available

The Nokia G310 is an entry-level Android smartphone, manufactured, designed, and released by Nokia, a subsidiary of HMD Global. It was announced on August 16, 2023, and released 8 days later, the Nokia G310 5G was made available in a blue color variant through T-Mobile and Metro by T-Mobile at a starting price of $186. According to HMD Global, the device features a battery life capable of lasting up to three days on a single charge.

HMD has positioned itself in the consumer electronics market by focusing on affordable, user-repairable smartphones. While other repair-friendly brands, such as Fairphone, expanded into the United States market with mid-range pricing comparable to Google Pixel devices (approximately $600), HMD introduced the G310 at a significantly lower price point of $186. This pricing strategy positions the G310 as a low-cost alternative for entry-level consumers interested in self-repair without the financial risk associated with modifying more expensive hardware.

== Specifications ==
=== Design ===
The physical hardware measures 165.1 × 75.7 × 8.6 mm (6.5 × 2.98 × 0.34 inches) and weighs 195.1 grams (6.88 ounces). It accommodates a single Nano-SIM configuration and features a chassis built for dust and splash resistance. Notably, the phone is built with a QuickFix user-reparable design, allowing easier individual maintenance and parts replacement. The device was launched in a single blue color option.

The front of the smartphone features a 6.56-inch IPS LCD panel with a 90 Hz refresh rate and a 20:9 aspect ratio. The screen offers a resolution of 720 × 1612 pixels, yielding a pixel density of approximately 269 pixels per inch. It provides roughly an 82.7% screen-to-body ratio. To safeguard against damage, the display is shielded by Corning Gorilla Glass 3.

=== Hardware ===
It is powered by an 8-nanometer Qualcomm SM4350-AC Snapdragon 480+ 5G chipset, which houses an octa-core processor. The CPU configuration consists of two performance cores clocked at 2.2 GHz and six efficiency cores clocked at 1.8 GHz, all utilizing the Kryo 460 architecture. Graphical tasks are handled by an integrated Adreno 619 graphics processing unit.

For internal memory, the device comes with 128 gigabytes of built-in storage paired with 4 gigabytes of random-access memory (RAM). Users can expand the available space using a dedicated microSDXC card slot. Additional hardware components include a loudspeaker, a standard 3.5mm audio jack, a side-mounted fingerprint sensor, an accelerometer, and a proximity sensor.

=== Camera ===
In terms of design, the Nokia G310 5G features a rounded rectangular camera island that draws design comparisons to contemporary 2023 Motorola smartphones, such as the Moto G Stylus. The rear camera array consists of a triple-lens setup led by a 50-megapixel wide-angle primary lens equipped with autofocus. This is accompanied by a 2-megapixel macro lens and an auxiliary lens. The main camera module is supported by an LED flash, HDR functionality, and panorama capture capabilities, and it can record video at up to 1080p resolution at 30 or 60 frames per second. On the front, a single 8-megapixel wide-angle camera is available for self-portraits and supports 1080p video recording at 30 frames per second.

=== Battery and software ===
Powering the handset is a non-removable lithium-polymer battery with a total capacity of 5000 milliampere-hours. It supports 20-watt wired charging. The charging protocol is compatible with both Power Delivery (PD) and Quick Charge (QC) standards.

The device runs on the Android 13 operating system out of the box.

== Reception ==
Android Headlines reviewer Arthur Brown noted that the Nokia G310 5G's display suffers from poor outdoor visibility under direct sunlight, contrasting it with other modern budget smartphones that feature higher peak brightness or dedicated sunlight boost modes. Testing indicated that while the screen performs adequately indoors and in shaded outdoor environments, its low maximum brightness makes the display difficult to see in bright sunlight, which also complicates outdoor photography. The device lacks an extended brightness boost mode, even with adaptive brightness enabled, requiring users to manually shade the screen to view it in bright conditions.

PCMag reviewer Sarah Lord noted that the limited RAM and storage capacities led to notable performance issues, including prolonged boot times, lag when switching between applications, and occasional system freezes.

In performance benchmarks, the device struggled with intensive tasks:

- Graphics: In the 1440p GFXBench Aztec Ruins test, the C210 achieved a frame rate of 2.5 frames per second (fps). This trailed competing budget devices like the Nokia G310 (6.5 fps) and the Samsung Galaxy A15 (5.7 fps), which utilize Snapdragon 480+ and MediaTek Dimensity 6100+ (6835) processors, respectively. For comparison, higher-tier devices like the Google Pixel 8a reached 55 fps in the same test.
- Software Compatibility: The device was unable to run certain standard benchmarking tools, including Geekbench 6 and PCMark.

Due to storage constraints, the C210 could not load resource-intensive mobile games such as Genshin Impact. However, it successfully ran less demanding titles, such as Alto’s Odyssey, without overheating. Overall, contemporary industry testing ranked the C210's performance below other smartphones released in the same period.
