= Pixel 7 =

2022 Android smartphones developed by Google

Pixel 7; Pixel 7 Pro
- Diagrams of the Pixel 7 (L) and Pixel 7 Pro (R)
- Brand: Google
- Manufacturer: Foxconn
- Type: Smartphone
- Series: Pixel
- First released: October 13, 2022; 4 years ago
- Availability by region: October 22 2022: Australia; Canada; Denmark; France; Germany; India; Ireland; Italy; Japan; Netherlands; Norway; Singapore; Spain; Sweden; Taiwan; United Kingdom; United States
- Discontinued: October 4, 2023
- Units sold: < 10 million (as of Oct. 2023)
- Predecessor: Pixel 6; Pixel 6 Pro
- Successor: Pixel 8
- Related: Pixel 7a; Pixel Fold; Pixel Tablet
- Compatible networks: GSM / EDGE; UMTS / HSPA+ / HSDPA; LTE; 5G sub-6 / mmWave
- Form factor: Slate
- Colors: Lemongrass; Snow; Obsidian; Hazel; Snow; Obsidian
- Dimensions: Pixel 7: H: 6.1 in (155.6 mm); W: 2.9 in (73.2 mm); D: 0.3 in (8.7 mm); Pixel 7 Pro: H: 6.4 in (162.9 mm); W: 3.0 in (76.6 mm); D: 0.4 in (8.9 mm)
- Weight: Pixel 7: 6.9 oz (197 g); Pixel 7 Pro: 7.5 oz (212 g)
- Operating system: Android 13; Upgradable to Android 17
- System-on-chip: Google Tensor G2
- Modem: Samsung Exynos 5300g
- Memory: Pixel 7: 8 GB LPDDR5; Pixel 7 Pro: 12 GB LPDDR5
- Storage: Pixel 7: 128 or 256 GB UFS 3.1; Pixel 7 Pro: 128, 256, or 512 GB UFS 3.1
- SIM: Nano SIM and eSIM
- Battery: Pixel 7: 4355 mAh; Pixel 7 Pro: 5000 mAh
- Charging: Pixel 7: 20 W fast charging; 20 W Qi wireless charging; Pixel 7 Pro: 23 W fast charging; 23 W Qi wireless charging; Both: Reverse wireless charging
- Rear camera: Pixel 7: 12 MP, f/2.2, 114˚ field of view (ultrawide), 1.25 μm; Pixel 7 Pro: 12 MP, f/2.2, 125.8˚ field of view (ultrawide), 1.25 μm; 48 MP, f/3.5, 20.6˚ field of view (telephoto), 0.7 μm, 5× optical zoom; Both: 50 MP, f/1.85, 82˚ field of view (wide), 1.2 μm; 4K video at 30 or 60 FPS; 1080p video at 30 or 60 FPS
- Front camera: 10.8 MP, f/2.2, 92.8˚ field of view (ultrawide), 1.22 μm; 4K video at 30 or 60 FPS
- Display: Pixel 7: 6.3 in (160.5 mm) FHD+ 1080p OLED at 416 ppi; 2400 × 1080 px (20:9); 90 Hz refresh rate; Pixel 7 Pro: 6.7 in (170 mm) QHD+ 1440p LTPO OLED at 512 ppi; 3120 × 1440 px (19.5:9); 120 Hz refresh rate; Both: HDR
- Sound: Stereo speakers; 3 microphones; Noise suppression; Spatial audio
- Connectivity: Wi-Fi 6E + HE160 + MIMO; Bluetooth 5.2; NFC; Google Cast; Dual-band GNSS (GPS / GLONASS / Galileo / QZSS); USB-C 3.2
- Data inputs: Accelerometer; Ambient light sensor; Barometer; Fingerprint scanner; Gyroscope; Magnetometer; Proximity sensor
- Water resistance: IP68
- Model: Pixel 7: GVU6C, GQML3; Pixel 7 Pro: GP4BC, GE2AE
- Codename: Pixel 7: Panther; Pixel 7 Pro: Cheetah
- Hearing aid compatibility: M3, T4
- Made in: China; Vietnam
- Other: Both: Gorilla Glass Victus cover; Gorilla Glass Victus back; Titan M2 security module; Pixel 7 Pro: Ultra-wideband (UWB) chip
- Website: Pixel 7; Pixel 7 Pro

The Pixel 7 and Pixel 7 Pro are a pair of Android-based smartphones designed, developed, and marketed by Google as part of the Google Pixel product line. They serve as the successors to the Pixel 6 and Pixel 6 Pro, respectively. The phones were first previewed in May 2022, during the Google I/O keynote. They use the Google Tensor G2 chip, which is also used by the Pixel Tablet and Pixel Fold. They shipped with Android 13 installed, and will receive OS and security updates until 2027.

The Pixel 7 and Pixel 7 Pro were officially announced on October 6, 2022, at the annual Made by Google event, and were released in the United States on October 13. They were succeeded by the Pixel 8 and Pixel 8 Pro, which were unveiled at the Made By Google event on October 4, 2023.

== History ==
The Pixel 7 and Pixel 7 Pro were previewed by Google on May 11, 2022, during the 2022 Google I/O keynote. During the keynote, the company confirmed that the phones would feature the second-generation Google Tensor system-on-chip (SoC), which had been in development by October 2021. The phones were approved by the Federal Communications Commission (FCC) in August 2022. Google officially announced the phones on October 6, 2022, alongside the Pixel Watch smartwatch, at the annual Made by Google event, and became available in 17 countries on October 13. A portion of the phones were manufactured by Foxconn in Vietnam, shifting production from southern China. Google requested approximately eight million Pixel 7 units from suppliers, with the goal of increasing its sales numbers twofold. During the launch event, Google also announced the phones' official cases, which became available for pre-order on the same day with three color options for each phone. Pre-orders for the phones began on the same day as the announcement.

== Specifications ==
=== Design ===
The Pixel 7 and Pixel 7 Pro both feature the single-tone back color scheme and large camera bar introduced in the Pixel 6 and Pixel 6 Pro, with the camera bar now made of aluminum. The front of the phones also retain the Pixel 6 series' centered hole-punch display notch. They are each available in three colors:

Color options for the Pixel 7 series
Pixel 7			Pixel 7 Pro		
Diagram of a Pixel 7 smartphone in gold.	Diagram of a Pixel 7 smartphone in white.	Diagram of a Pixel 7 smartphone in black.	Diagram of a Pixel 7 smartphone in green.	Diagram of a Pixel 7 smartphone in white.	Diagram of a Pixel 7 smartphone in black.
Lemongrass	Snow	Obsidian	Hazel	Snow	Obsidian

=== Hardware ===
The Pixel 7 has a 6.3 in (160.5 mm) FHD+ 1080p OLED display at 416 ppi with a 2400 × 1080 pixel resolution and a 20:9 aspect ratio, while the Pixel 7 Pro has a 6.7 in (170 mm) QHD+ 1440p LTPO OLED curved-edge display at 512 PPI with a 3120 × 1440 pixel resolution and a 19.5:9 aspect ratio. The Pixel 7 has a 90 Hz refresh rate while the Pixel 7 Pro has a 120 Hz variable refresh rate. Both phones contain a 50 MP wide rear camera and a 12 MP ultrawide rear camera, with the Pixel 7 Pro featuring an additional 48 MP telephoto 5× optical zoom rear camera. The front camera on both phones contains a 10.8 MP ultrawide lens. The phones bring back the Pixel 4 and Pixel 4 XL's Face Unlock facial recognition system, except the feature is now solely powered by the front camera rather than Project Soli radar technology.

The Pixel 7 has a 4355 mAh battery, while the Pixel 7 Pro has a 5000 mAh battery. Both phones support fast charging, Qi wireless charging, and reverse wireless charging. The Pixel 7 is available in 128 or 256 GB of storage and 8 GB of RAM, and the Pixel 7 Pro is available in 128, 256, or 512 GB of storage and 12 GB of RAM. In addition to the second-generation Tensor chip, both phones are also equipped with the Titan M2 security module, along with an under-display optical fingerprint scanner, stereo speakers, and Gorilla Glass Victus. Counterpoint Research calculated that the Pixel 7 Pro cost an estimated US$413 to manufacture.

=== Software ===
The Pixel 7 and Pixel 7 Pro shipped with Android 13 and version 8.7 of the Google Camera app at launch. It was originally set to receive three years of major OS upgrades and five years of security updates, but the former was later increased to five years, with support extending to 2027. In addition to enhancements to Night Sight and Real Tone, camera features introduced on the Pixel 7 and Pixel 7 Pro include Guided Frame, Photo Unblur, and Cinematic Blur. A macrophotography mode is also available on the Pixel 7 Pro to accompany its additional telephoto lens, as are upgrades to Super Res Zoom. The Direct My Call feature and Recorder app both received performance upgrades, while Google announced that its VPN service from Google One would be bundled with the Pixel 7 series at no additional charge. The Pixel 7 and Pixel 7 Pro only run apps that have 64-bit binaries, the first Android smartphones with such a restriction. As part of a partnership with Google, Snapchat and TikTok announced support for 10-bit HDR video on the Pixel 7 series.

== Marketing ==
Similar to the previous year, Pixel 7-themed chips were made available in Japan weeks prior to the phones' launch event. In October 2022, Google partnered with the NBA to produce a series of advertisements for the Pixel lineup featuring multiple NBA athletes. In February 2023, Google released a commercial titled "Fixed on Pixel" which advertised the Pixel 7's Magic Eraser feature, ahead of its airing during Super Bowl LVII. Featuring Amy Schumer, Doja Cat, and Giannis Antetokounmpo, the 90-second commercial marked Google's second Super Bowl spot in a row to market the Pixel. The song "We Run This" by Missy Elliott is used in the commercial. "Fixed on Pixel" was positively received by viewers, with Northwestern University's Kellogg School of Management placing it among the highest-ranked spots of Super Bowl LVII. People and Teen Vogue both named it one of the best commercials of the event, while CBS Sports ranked it as second-best and Tom's Guide labeled it as the best. It was the fifth most-watched Super Bowl LVII commercial on YouTube, and was ranked 12th on USA Today's Super Bowl Ad Meter, scoring 5.81 points on a scale of 10. In June 2023, the Pixel 7 Pro and Pixel Fold were featured in a series of comparative advertisements targeting the iPhone.

== Reception ==
=== Critical response ===
Following the Pixel 7 and Pixel 7 Pro's reveal at the 2022 Google I/O, Sean Hollister of The Verge praised Google's development of a distinctive Pixel design language with the continuation of the Pixel 6 and Pixel 6a's camera bar. Both phones were well received after their launch. Julian Chokkattu of Wired and Max Buondonno of CNN Underscored lauded the phones' competitive pricing, displays, and camera capabilities. Dave LeClair of PCMag commended the Pixel 7's price and performance, while praising the Pixel 7 Pro's display and photography-related features. Gizmodo's Florence Ion acclaimed the phones' camera system, and Marques Brownlee highlighted their software features. Mark Knapp and Kevin Lee of IGN viewed the phones as marginally superior to the Pixel 6 series, but praised Google's refinements nonetheless. The Verge's Allison Johnson concurred, but found some new AI features “underwhelming”. Lisa Eadicicco and Andrew Lanxon of CNET hailed the phones' incremental improvements as a reflection of Google's successful product formula, praising their design and features but criticizing the battery life. Engadget reviewer Sam Rutherford had a more positive experience with battery life, also praising the phones' upgraded designs. Mashable's Alex Perry eulogized the larger phone's camera, but had reservations about the smaller Pixel 7 and lamented the loss of the Pixel 6 series' two-toned back design. Writing for TechRadar, Alex Walker-Todd applauded the Pixel 7's design and camera, while his colleague Philip Berne had mixed feelings about the Pixel 7 Pro's software features.

=== Commercial reception ===
During Google parent company Alphabet's quarterly earnings investor call in February 2023, Google and Alphabet CEO Sundar Pichai touted the Pixel 6a, 7, and 7 Pro as Google's "best-selling generation of phones", allowing Google to gain market share in all of its markets. Additionally, a survey conducted by market research firm Wave7 in January 2023 further indicated that the Pixel 7 series, especially the Pro model, experienced stronger numbers than the Pixel 6 series. The Pixel 7 series, alongside the Pixel 6a, were principally responsible for the Pixel's 87 % year-over-year growth globally. Data from the International Data Corporation showed that Google sold around 10 million Pixel phones during the 2022–2023 fiscal year.

== Successors ==
The Pixel 7 and Pixel 7 Pro were succeeded by the Pixel 8 and Pixel 8 Pro in October 2023.
