= Pixel 4a =

2020 Android smartphone designed by Google

Pixel 4a; Pixel 4a (5G)

- A diagram of the Pixel 4a's front side, showing its hole-punch camera on the top left side
- Brand: Google
- Manufacturer: Foxconn
- Type: Smartphone
- Series: Pixel
- First released: Pixel 4a: August 20, 2020; 6 years ago; Pixel 4a (5G): November 5, 2020; 5 years ago
- Availability by region: Pixel 4a: August 20, 2020; United States; Canada; Australia; Singapore; Taiwan October 1, 2020; United Kingdom; France October 13, 2020; India; Pixel 4a (5G): October 15, 2020; Japan
- Discontinued: Pixel 4a: January 31, 2022; 4 years ago; Pixel 4a (5G): August 20, 2021; 5 years ago
- Predecessor: Pixel 3a
- Successor: Pixel 5a
- Related: Pixel 4
- Compatible networks: GSM/EDGE, UMTS/HSPA+, CDMA EVDO Rev A, WCDMA, LTE, LTE Advanced, 5G
- Form factor: Slate
- Dimensions: Pixel 4a: H: 144 mm (5.7 in) W: 69.4 mm (2.73 in) D: 8.2 mm (0.32 in); Pixel 4a (5G): H 153.9 mm (6.06 in) W: 74 mm (2.9 in) D 8.2–8.5 mm (0.32–0.33 in)
- Weight: Pixel 4a: 143 g (5.0 oz); Pixel 4a (5G): 168–171 g (5.9–6.0 oz)
- Operating system: Pixel 4a: Android 10, upgradable to Android 13; Pixel 4a (5G): Android 11, upgradable to Android 14
- System-on-chip: Pixel 4a: Qualcomm Snapdragon 730G; Pixel 4a (5G): Qualcomm Snapdragon 765G
- CPU: Octa-core: Pixel 4a: (2×2.2 GHz Kryo 470 Gold & 6×1.8 GHz Kryo 470 Silver); Pixel 4a (5G): (1×2.4 GHz Kryo 475 Prime & 1×2.2 GHz Kryo 475 Gold & 6×1.8 GHz Kryo 475 Silver)
- GPU: Pixel 4a: Adreno 618; Pixel 4a (5G): Adreno 620
- Memory: 6 GB LPDDR4X
- Storage: 128 GB UFS 2.1
- Removable storage: None
- SIM: Nano-SIM and eSIM
- Battery: Pixel 4a: 3140 mAh; Pixel 4a (5G): 3885 mAh
- Rear camera: Pixel 4a: 12.2 MP, 1.4 μm with f/1.7 lens (wide), Dual Pixel Phase autofocus and optical image stabilization, Electronic image stabilization 4K at 30 fps, 1080p at 30/60/120 fps, 720p at 30/60/240 fps; Pixel 4a (5G): 12.2 MP, 1.4 μm with f/1.7 lens (wide), Dual Pixel Phase autofocus and optical image stabilization + 16 MP (ultrawide), 1.0 μm with f/2.2 lens, 107°, Electronic image stabilization 4K at 30/60 fps, 1080p at 30/60/120/240 fps, 720p at 30/60/240 fps
- Front camera: 8 MP with f/2.0 lens and 84° lens, fixed focus, 1080p at 30 fps, 720p at 30 fps, 480p at 30 fps
- Display: FHD+ OLED, 2340 × 1080 resolution (19.5:9 aspect ratio); Gorilla Glass 3: Pixel 4a: 5.8 in (147.3 mm), 443 ppi; Pixel 4a (5G): 6.2 in (157.5 mm), 413 ppi
- Sound: Stereo speakers, 3.5 mm headphone jack
- Connectivity: Wi-Fi 5 (ac/n/g/b/a) 2.4 + 5.0 GHz, Bluetooth 5.0 + LE, NFC, GPS (GLONASS, Galileo, QZSS)
- Data inputs: USB-C
- Codename: Sunfish (Pixel 4a); Bramble (Pixel 4a (5G))
- Other: 18 W fast charging; Titan M security module
- Website: Google Pixel 4a Google Pixel 4a (5G)

The Pixel 4a and Pixel 4a (5G) are a pair of Android-based smartphones designed, developed, and marketed by Google as part of its Google Pixel product line. They collectively serve as mid-range variants of the Pixel 4 and Pixel 4 XL. The Pixel 4a was announced on August 3, 2020, via a press release, while the Pixel 4a (5G) was announced on September 30, 2020, at the "Launch Night In" event. The Pixel 4a was considered to be one of the best budget smartphones of the 2020 year, being priced at around $400 USD.

== Specifications ==
=== Design and hardware ===
Schematic of Pixel 4a's back, showing camera module and fingerprint sensor in upper left and upper center, respectively

The Pixel 4a and 4a (5G) resemble the Pixel 4, but have a polycarbonate unibody construction and Gorilla Glass 3 for the screen. Both devices are available in 'Just Black', with a hint of a minty-light-green power button. 'Clearly White' is exclusive to the Pixel 4a (5G), only on Verizon with millimeter-wave (mmWave) support at launch. A limited edition 'Barely Blue' color for the Pixel 4a was later added to the Google Store. The back houses a capacitive fingerprint sensor centered below the camera lens, which was decently reliable at the time of release. Both have stereo loudspeakers, one located on the bottom edge and the other doubling as the earpiece, the main one being the bottom edge speaker, and a 3.5 mm headphone jack. A USB-C port is used for charging and connecting other accessories. The USB-C Port is version 2.0.

The Pixel 4a is powered by the Qualcomm Snapdragon 730G system-on-chip / Adreno 618 GPU, while the Pixel 4a (5G) is powered by the Qualcomm Snapdragon 765G system-on-chip / Adreno 620 GPU. Both have 6 GB of RAM, with 128 GB of non-expandable internal storage. They both lack wireless charging, water resistance, Active Edge and the Pixel Neural Core (PNC); all of which are standard on the Pixel 4. The battery capacity is 3140 mAh for the Pixel 4a and 3885 mAh for the Pixel 4a (5G); fast charging is supported at up to 18 W, which while considered slow, due to the small battery, the Pixel 4a and 4a (5G) charged quite fast. (USB Power Delivery, using in-box adapter).

The Pixel 4a and Pixel 4a (5G) feature a 1080p OLED display with HDR support measuring 5.8-inches and 6.2-inches respectively. The display has slim uniform bezels, and a circular cutout in the upper left hand corner for the front-facing camera, with a 19.5:9 aspect ratio.

The Pixel 4a and Pixel 4a (5G) have a raised square module housing the in built camera system. The Pixel 4a has a single rear-facing camera, with the same 12.2-megapixel sensor found on the Pixel 4; the Pixel 4a (5G) adds a secondary 16-megapixel ultrawide sensor. The front-facing camera has an 8-megapixel sensor. Both phones can record video at 4K resolution; the Pixel 4a is limited to 30 fps when recording at a resolution greater than 1080p, and the Pixel 4a (5G) supports 60 fps. They have Google Camera 7.4 with software enhancements, including Live HDR+ with dual exposure controls, improved Night Sight with Astrophotography mode, and improved Portrait Mode with more realistic bokeh. Google also offers unlimited cloud photo storage at "high quality"; original resolution storage requires users to pay for Google One.

=== Software ===
The Pixel 4a shipped with Android 10 and version 7.4 of the Google Camera app at launch, while the Pixel 4a (5G) shipped with Android 11 and version 8.0 of the Google Camera app at launch. Both are expected to receive 3 years of major OS upgrades with support extending until 2023, and have features such as Call Screen and a Personal Safety app.

== Reception ==
The Pixel 4a was released to generally positive reviews with many reviewers praising the camera quality and overall value for money. At the time, the biggest competitor of the Pixel 4a was the iPhone SE. The iPhone SE failed compared to the Pixel 4a, having a generally worse battery, screen, and worse value for money. This was said by several reviewers including MrWhoseTheBoss, and Marques Brownlee. CNET's Lynn La gave the Pixel 4a a score of 8.4/10, considering it to have the best photo quality among phones in the same price range. Dieter Bohn of The Verge praised the phone for its excellent camera and acceptable battery life, but criticized the mediocre video recording performance and lack of wireless charging and water resistance. Brian Chen of The New York Times compared the Pixel 4a with the second-generation iPhone SE, remarking that the Pixel had superior low light photos, and a better display and battery life, but the iPhone had better performance. Samuel Gibbs of The Guardian stated that the phone operated smoothly and had better battery life than the Pixel 3a XL and the iPhone SE.

== Known issues ==
- Some Pixel 4a (5G) users reported touchscreen problems. Google addressed this in a February 2021 security update.

=== Battery overheating ===
Some batteries in Pixel 4a devices are prone to overheating. The Australian Competition & Consumer Commission recalled the Pixel 4a for battery overheating that "could pose a risk of fire and/or burns to a user."

The battery overheating issue, which Google didn't explicitly state, prompted an automatic Android 13 update rolled out to all Pixel 4a devices beginning on January 8, 2025. For impacted devices, the update reduced "battery's runtime and charging performance." As compensation, Google offered an appeasement option to impacted users for a partial refund, store credit, or free battery replacement for qualifying impacted devices.

Google's US$50 partial refund implementation was criticized for only paying out to impacted users with Payoneer bank accounts, which have an annual account fee of US$29.95.

There has been some speculation in tech media that there could be a serious problem with the 4a batteries, similar to those that prompted Apple, in the batterygate incident in 2017, to reduce performance on certain iPhones to prevent accidental shutdowns. Apple subsequently had to pay hundreds of millions of dollars resulting from class action lawsuits. Google's appeasement program may be an effort to proactively address the issue rather than waiting for the courts to do so.

== See also ==
- Pixel 6a, another Google device with similar purported battery issues
