= Google One =

Subscription service from Google

- Developer: Google
- Release: May 14, 2018; 8 years ago

Stable release(s) [±]
- Android: 1.320 (Build 955391812) / July 28, 2026; 3 months ago
- iOS (Note: Including iPadOS): 1.129.1 / July 15, 2026; 4 months ago
- Operating system: Android 9+; iOS 16+; web
- Type: Cloud storage service
- Website: one.google.com

Google One is a consumer subscription service from Google that provides expanded cloud storage. Paid plans range from 100 GB to 30 TB. A 30 GB Google One Lite plan is available in some countries such as India. This extends the 15 GB storage of a free Google Account, shared across Google Drive, Gmail, and Google Photos.

Launched in May 2018, Google One replaced the paid services of Google Drive to emphasize that the program is used by multiple Google services. The various plans include other benefits. The service has over 150 million subscribers as of May 2025.

== History ==
Google One was launched in May 2018. The 1 TB plan for Google Drive was upgraded to 2 TB, while the 2 TB plan's price was the same as Google Drive's 1 TB plan (US$9.99). 24/7 support was available with all Google One plans. From May to August 2018, Google began upgrading Google Drive users in the United States to Google One. All Google users in the U.S. could get access to Google One free of charge, but without member benefits or upgraded storage.

On October 29, 2020, Google added a VPN service for Google One users on a 2 TB plan or higher; this was discontinued on June 20, 2024.

In January 2023, the Google One app passed one billion downloads on Android. In February 2023, the Magic Eraser editing feature in Google Photos previously exclusive to Pixel 6 and 7 owners was made available to all Google One users. In March 2023, Google expanded access to the VPN service to all plans and added a dark web monitoring feature for most users; the dark web monitoring feature was discontinued on February 16, 2026. On February 8, 2024, Google introduced the AI Premium plan which provides access to Gemini Advanced and Gemini in Gmail, Docs, Slides, Sheets, and Meet. This was replaced the following year by two plans: Google AI Ultra and Google AI Pro, announced at the 2025 Google I/O keynote.

== Features ==
Every Google Account provides 15 GB of storage for Google Drive, Gmail, and Google Photos. Google One increases the quota to 100 GB or more, depending on the plan, and provides additional functionality, such as Google Photos editing, which can be shared with up to 5 other people. Non-subscribers can use Google One to back up data from Android or iOS devices, and clean up space in their Google Account with the storage manager.

Google One advertisement, 2019

A paid plan provides:

- More storage space, depending upon the plan.
- Support from "Google experts" for Google services available 24/7 in the US over chat, email, and phone. Support options elsewhere vary.
- Automatic phone backup on Android through the Google One app
- Enhanced editing features such as Magic Eraser—which erases parts of an image and uses AI to fill in the erased section to look like the rest of the background—portrait light, blur, and color pop become available on Google Photos.—
- Ability for up to five additional family members to share a Google One subscription.
- Up to 10% cashback on purchases from the Google Store for users in the 200 GB and 2 TB plans.
- Google Play credits and other benefits from Google services.
- Gemini Advanced, available only in the 2 TB AI Premium Plan.
- The accounts of Google One subscribers display a modified avatar icon.

== Storage ==
Gmail, Google Drive, and Google Photos use storage managed by Google One. Prices vary by region. Storage purchases renew automatically at the end of the subscription period. Users can upgrade their storage plan at any time.

Storage can be shared with up to 5 additional family members, with each person getting the default 15 GB. Files count towards the free default storage before counting towards shared storage. Many items do not take up any extra space: shared files or files in "Shared with me" only use up the owner's quota. Google Pixel phones up to the Pixel 5 allow users to back up an unlimited number of videos and photos that don't count towards the quota.

When Google Photos was announced in 2015, free unlimited photo storage was promised. On June 1, 2021, Google removed unlimited storage from the "High quality" (renamed "Storage saver") and "Express quality" settings in Google Photos and Google Docs Editors (except Google Sites), for file formats stored in Google Drive. Users have a storage quota, though photos, videos, and Docs Editor files uploaded before June 1 were not affected.
