= Pixel 5a =

Android smartphone developed by Google

- Also known as: Pixel 5a with 5G, Pixel 5a 5G
- Brand: Google
- Manufacturer: Foxconn
- Type: Smartphone
- Series: Pixel
- First released: August 26, 2021; 4 years ago
- Availability by region: August 26, 2021: United States; Japan
- Discontinued: July 21, 2022; 4 years ago
- Predecessor: Pixel 4a
- Successor: Pixel 6a
- Related: Pixel 5
- Compatible networks: GSM/EDGE, UMTS/HSPA+, CDMA EVDO Rev A, WCDMA, LTE, LTE Advanced, 5G
- Form factor: Slate
- Color: Mostly Black
- Dimensions: H: 154.9 mm (6.10 in); W: 73.7 mm (2.90 in); D: 7.6 mm (0.30 in)
- Weight: 183 g (6.5 oz)
- Operating system: Original: Android 11; Current: Android 14
- System-on-chip: Qualcomm Snapdragon 765G
- CPU: Octa-core, (1×2.4 GHz Kryo 475 Prime & 1×2.2 GHz Kryo 475 Gold & 6×1.8 GHz Kryo 475 Silver)
- GPU: Adreno 620
- Memory: 6 GB LPDDR4X
- Storage: 128 GB UFS 2.1
- Removable storage: None
- SIM: Nano-SIM and eSIM
- Battery: 4680 mAh
- Charging: 18 W fast charging
- Rear camera: Sony Exmor IMX363 12.2 MP, 1.4 μm with f/1.7 lens (wide), Dual Pixel Phase autofocus and optical image stabilization + 16 MP (ultrawide), 1.0 μm with f/2.2 lens, 107°, Electronic image stabilization 4K at 30/60 fps, 1080p at 30/60/120/240 fps, 720p at 30/60/240 fps
- Front camera: 8 MP with f/2.0 lens and 84° lens, fixed focus, 1080p at 30 fps, 720p at 30 fps, 480p at 30 fps
- Display: FHD+ 1080p OLED, 2400 × 1080 resolution (20:9 aspect ratio); Gorilla Glass 3, HDR; 6.34 in (161 mm), 415 ppi
- Sound: Stereo speakers; 3.5mm headphone jack
- Connectivity: Wi-Fi 5 (ac/n/g/b/a) 2.4 + 5.0 GHz, Bluetooth 5.0 + LE, NFC, GPS (GLONASS, Galileo, QZSS)
- Data inputs: USB Type-C
- Water resistance: IP67, up to 1 m (3.3 ft) for 30 minutes
- Model: G1F8F, G4S1M
- Codename: Barbet
- Other: Titan M security module
- Website: Google Pixel 5a with 5G

The Pixel 5a, also known as the Pixel 5a with 5G, is an Android-based smartphone designed, developed, and marketed by Google as part of its Google Pixel product line. It serves as a mid-range variant of the Pixel 5. It was officially announced on August 17, 2021, via a press release and released on August 26.

It is also the only Pixel -a phone to not be available in Europe.

== Specifications ==
=== Design and hardware ===
The Pixel 5a is built with an aluminum body and Gorilla Glass 3 for the screen. The device is available in a single color, Mostly Black. The housing has a thick coating of plastic, while the power button is textured. The back houses a capacitive fingerprint sensor centered below the camera lens. It has stereo loudspeakers, one located on the bottom edge and the other doubling as the earpiece, and a 3.5 mm headphone jack. A USB-C port is used for charging and connecting other accessories.

The Pixel 5a uses the Qualcomm Snapdragon 765G system-on-chip (consisting of eight Kryo 475 cores, an Adreno 620 GPU and a Hexagon 696 DSP), with 6 GB of LPDDR4X RAM and 128 GB of non-expandable UFS 2.1 internal storage. The Snapdragon 765G allows for standard 5G connectivity, however only "sub-6" networks are supported.

The Pixel 5a has a 4680 mAh battery, and is capable of fast charging at up to 18 W. It has an IP67 water protection rating, an upgrade over its predecessor which lacked water protection.

The Pixel 5a features a 6.34-inch (161mm) 1080p OLED display with HDR support. The display has a 20:9 aspect ratio, and a circular cutout in the upper left hand corner for the front-facing camera.

The Pixel 5a includes dual rear-facing cameras located within a raised square module. The wide 28 mm 77 °F/1.7 lens has the Sony Exmor IMX363 12.2-megapixel sensor, while the ultrawide 107 °F/2.2 lens has a 16-megapixel sensor; the front-facing camera uses an 8-megapixel sensor. It is capable of recording 4K video at 30 or 60 fps.

=== Software ===
The Pixel 5a shipped with Android 11 and Google Camera 8.2 at launch, with features such as Call Screen and a Personal Safety app. It is expected to receive 3 years of major OS upgrades with support extending until August 2024. It is the first Pixel phone not to ship with unlimited storage in high definition on Google Photos. In October 2021, the Pixel 5a was updated to Android 12, in August 2022, the Pixel 5a was updated to Android 13, and in October 2023, the Pixel 5a was updated to Android 14.

== Known issues ==
- The Pixel 5a overheats when recording 4K 60 fps videos. It can only record 4 minutes of 4K video (or 30 minutes of 1080p video) before it shuts down. Google continues to investigate the overheating issue.
- There are touchscreen issues with the bottom half of the display. Google is investigating them.
- The Pixel 5a is acknowledged to have a high incidence rate of motherboard failures, causing power issues resulting in a blank or black screen. As a response, Google Pixel implemented an extended 2 year repair warranty for this problem in the 5a beyond the standard 1 year Google Hardware Warranty.
