= Pixel 6 =

2021 Android smartphones developed by Google

Pixel 6; Pixel 6 Pro
- Diagrams of the Pixel 6 (L) and Pixel 6 Pro (R)
- Brand: Google
- Manufacturer: Foxconn
- Type: Smartphone
- Series: Pixel
- First released: October 28, 2021; 5 years ago
- Availability by region: October 2021: Australia; Canada; France; Germany; Ireland; Japan; Taiwan; United Kingdom; United States; February 2022: Italy; Singapore; Spain
- Discontinued: October 6, 2022
- Units sold: 3.75 million (as of October 2022)
- Predecessor: Pixel 5
- Successor: Pixel 7
- Related: Pixel 6a
- Compatible networks: GSM / EDGE; UMTS / HSPA+ / HSDPA; LTE; 5G sub-6 / mmWave
- Form factor: Slate
- Dimensions: Pixel 6: H: 6.2 in (158.6 mm); W: 2.9 in (74.8 mm); D: 0.4 in (8.9 mm); Pixel 6 Pro: H: 6.5 in (163.9 mm); W: 3.0 in (75.9 mm); D: 0.4 in (8.9 mm)
- Weight: Pixel 6: 7.30 oz (207 g); Pixel 6 Pro: 7.41 oz (210 g)
- Operating system: Android 12; Upgradable to Android 17
- System-on-chip: Google Tensor
- CPU: Octa-core (2x2.8 GHz Cortex-X1 & 2x2.25 GHz Cortex-A76 & 4x1.8 GHz Cortex-A55)
- GPU: Mali-G78 MP20
- Modem: Samsung Exynos 5123b
- Memory: Pixel 6: 8 GB LPDDR5; Pixel 6 Pro: 12 GB LPDDR5
- Storage: Pixel 6: 128 or 256 GB UFS 3.1; Pixel 6 Pro: 128, 256, or 512 GB UFS 3.1
- SIM: Nano SIM and eSIM
- Battery: Pixel 6: 4614 mAh; Pixel 6 Pro: 5003 mAh
- Charging: Pixel 6: 21 W fast charging; 21 W Qi wireless charging; Pixel 6 Pro: 23 W fast charging; 23 W Qi wireless charging; Both: Reverse wireless charging
- Rear camera: Both: 50 MP, f/1.85, 82˚ field of view (wide), 1.2 μm; 12 MP, f/2.2, 114˚ field of view (ultrawide), 1.25 μm; 4K video at 30 or 60 FPS; 1080p video at 30 or 60 FPS; Pixel 6 Pro: 48 MP, f/3.5, 23.5˚ field of view (telephoto), 0.8 μm, 4× optical zoom
- Front camera: Pixel 6: 8 MP, f/2.0, 84˚ field of view (wide), 1.12 μm; 1080p video at 30 FPS; Pixel 6 Pro: 11.1 MP, f/2.2, 94˚ field of view (ultrawide), 1.22 μm; 4K video at 30 FPS; 1080p video at 30 or 60 FPS
- Display: Pixel 6: 6.4 in (163 mm) FHD+ 1080p OLED at 411 ppi; 2400 × 1080 px (20:9); 90 Hz refresh rate; Pixel 6 Pro: 6.7 in (170 mm) QHD+ 1440p LTPO OLED at 512 ppi; 3120 × 1440 px (19.5:9); 120 Hz refresh rate; Both: HDR10+
- Sound: Stereo speakers; 3 microphones; Noise suppression
- Connectivity: Wi-Fi 6E + HE160 + 2X2 MIMO; Bluetooth 5.2; NFC; Google Cast; Dual-band GNSS (GPS / GLONASS / Galileo / QZSS); USB-C: USB 5Gbps
- Data inputs: Accelerometer; Ambient light sensor; Barometer; Fingerprint scanner; Gyroscope; Magnetometer; Proximity sensor
- Water resistance: IP68
- Model: Pixel 6: GB7N6, G9S9B; Pixel 6 Pro: GLUOG, G8VOU
- Codename: Pixel 6: Oriole; Pixel 6 Pro: Raven
- Hearing aid compatibility: Pixel 6: M3, T3; Pixel 6 Pro: M3, T4
- Made in: China
- Other: Pixel 6: Gorilla Glass 6 back; Pixel 6 Pro: Gorilla Glass Victus back; Ultra-wideband (UWB) chip; Both: Gorilla Glass Victus cover; Titan M2 security module
- Website: Pixel 6; Pixel 6 Pro

The Pixel 6 and Pixel 6 Pro are a pair of Android-based smartphones designed, developed, and marketed by Google as part of the Google Pixel product line. They collectively serve as the successor to the Pixel 5. The phones were first previewed in August 2021, confirming reports that they would be powered by a custom system-on-chip named Google Tensor. The cameras are housed in a horizontal bar on the back, while the front features a hole-punch display notch in the center. They shipped with Android 12, with Google announcing numerous artificial intelligence and ambient computing features during the phones' launch event.

The Pixel 6 and Pixel 6 Pro were officially announced on October 19, 2021, at the Pixel Fall Launch event, and were released in the United States on October 28, following an extensive marketing campaign. They received generally positive reviews from critics, who praised its Tensor chip, cameras, performance, design, and price, though the fingerprint sensor and battery life received mixed reactions. The phones became Google's fastest-selling Pixel devices, allowing the company to become the fifth-largest smartphone manufacturer in North America and the United Kingdom during the first quarter of 2022. They were succeeded by the Pixel 7 and Pixel 7 Pro which were officially announced at the Made By Google event on October 7, 2022.

== History ==
The Pixel 6 and Pixel 6 Pro were previewed by Google on August 2, 2021, confirming the phones' new designs and the introduction of its custom Tensor system-on-chip (SoC). Previous Pixel devices had used Qualcomm Snapdragon chips, with Google having begun developing its own chips codenamed Whitechapel as early as April 2016. The devices were approved by the Federal Communications Commission (FCC) in September. Google officially announced the phones on October 19, 2021, at the Pixel Fall Launch event, and they became available in nine countries on October 28. The phones were manufactured by Foxconn, and were originally intended to be produced in Vietnam before shifting back to China due to the Chinese government's stringent border controls imposed in response to the COVID-19 pandemic. Google doubled the production of its phones compared to last year in attempt to boost its market share, manufacturing approximately seven million devices. The phones were not made available in India at launch due to supply chain issues.

During the launch event, Google also announced the phones' official cases, which became available for pre-order on the same day with three color options for the Pixel 6 and four color options for the Pixel 6 Pro, as well as the second-generation Pixel Stand wireless charger, which went on sale on November 18 and began shipping on December 13. Pre-orders for the phones began on the same day as the announcement, with shipping commencing on October 25. The Google Store did not offer any discounts for the devices on Black Friday, a departure from prior years. In February 2022, the Pixel 6 and Pixel 6 Pro became available in Italy and Spain in "limited quantities", with a limited launch in Singapore two weeks later.

== Specifications ==
=== Design ===
The Pixel 6 and Pixel 6 Pro both feature a unique design that is visually distinct from previous-generation Pixel phones, including a large camera bar and two-tone color scheme on the back. The front of both phones also feature a centered hole-punch display notch. They are each available in three colors:

Color options for the Pixel 6 series
Pixel 6			Pixel 6 Pro		
Diagram of a Pixel 6 smartphone in orange.	Diagram of a Pixel 6 smartphone in black.	Diagram of a Pixel 6 smartphone in green.	Diagram of a Pixel 6 smartphone in gray.	Diagram of a Pixel 6 smartphone in gold.	Diagram of a Pixel 6 smartphone in black.
Kinda Coral	Stormy Black	Sorta Seafoam	Cloudy White	Sorta Sunny	Stormy Black

=== Hardware ===
The Pixel 6 has a 6.4 in (163 mm) FHD+ 1080p OLED display at 411 ppi with a 2400 × 1080 pixel resolution and a 20:9 aspect ratio, while the Pixel 6 Pro has a 6.7 in (170 mm) QHD+ 1440p LTPO OLED curved edges display at 512 ppi with a 3120 × 1440 pixel resolution and a 19.5:9 aspect ratio. Both displays have HDR10+ support; the Pixel 6 has a 90 Hz refresh rate and the Pixel 6 Pro has a 120 Hz variable refresh rate. Both phones contain a 50 MP wide rear camera and a 12 MP ultrawide rear camera, with the Pixel 6 Pro featuring an additional 48 MP with 4× optical zoom telephoto rear camera. The front camera on the Pixel 6 contains an 8 MP wide lens, while the one on the Pixel 6 Pro contains an 11.1 MP ultrawide lens. The new Tensor chip also brought Live HDR+ to video as well as enhancements to the Night Sight and Super Res Zoom features on the devices.

The Pixel 6 has a 4614 mAh battery, while the Pixel 6 Pro has a 5003 mAh battery. Both phones support fast charging, Qi wireless charging, as well as reverse wireless charging. The Pixel 6 is available in 128 or 256 GB of storage and 8 GB of RAM, and the Pixel 6 Pro is available in 128, 256, or 512 GB of storage and 12 GB of RAM. In addition to the Tensor chip, both phones are also equipped with the Titan M2 security module, which is based on the RISC-V open standard, along with an under-display optical fingerprint scanner, stereo speakers, and Gorilla Glass Victus. In April 2022, 9to5Google reported that the Pixel 6 Pro was originally planning to be launched with a Face Unlock facial recognition feature, similar to that of the Pixel 4 and Pixel 4 XL's but solely relying on the phone's front camera rather than on Project Soli radar technology; the feature was canceled for unknown reasons shortly prior to the launch event.

=== Software ===
As with prior generations of the Pixel phone, Google placed heavy emphasis on artificial intelligence and ambient computing capabilities during the Pixel Fall Launch event, debuting features such as Magic Eraser, Face Unblur, Motion Mode, Real Tone, Direct My Call, Wait Times, and Live Translate. Additionally, Assistant voice typing and grammar correction serve as exclusive features on the Pixel 6 series, while Google Pay's digital car key feature launched first on the Pixel 6, Pixel 6 Pro, and Samsung Galaxy S21 in November. Material You, a more personalized variant of Google's Material Design design language, was also a major focus in Google's marketing efforts.

The Pixel 6 and Pixel 6 Pro shipped with Android 12 at launch, coinciding with the stable release of Android 12 on the Android Open Source Project (AOSP), along with version 8.4 of the Google Camera app. It was originally set to receive three years of major OS upgrades and five years of security updates, but the former was later increased to five years, with support extending to 2026. Continuing the Pixel 5a's trend, the Pixel 6 and Pixel 6 Pro did not come with unlimited photo storage in "high quality" on Google Photos, being the second Pixel phone not to include the offer. Concurrently with the Pixel Fall Launch event, Android 12 became available on older Pixel phones, while the Security Hub and Privacy Dashboard were introduced. Google also announced Pixel Pass, a subscription bundle similar to Apple One and Xbox All-Access which bundles the Pixel 6 series with Google One, YouTube Premium, YouTube Music Premium, Google Play Pass, and an extended warranty; the service was discontinued two years later, ahead of the launch of the Pixel 8.

== Marketing ==
Google kickstarted the phones' marketing campaign early, beginning with online commercials, billboards in major cities, and magazine advertisements in September 2021. Pixel 6-themed potato chips were made available in Japan. Additionally, the company partnered with Channel 4, the NBA, and Snapchat to promote the phones. Models of the phones were also available on display at the Google Store Chelsea in New York City prior to the launch event. Google CFO Ruth Porat had previously revealed during parent company Alphabet's quarterly earnings investor call in August that the company was planning to substantially increase its marketing and sales expenses in anticipation for the phones' launch, while Google hardware chief Rick Osterloh declared their intention to "invest in marketing".

In November 2021, it was announced that actor Simu Liu, who portrays Shang-Chi in the Marvel Cinematic Universe (MCU) media franchise, would serve as the Pixel 6's brand ambassador in Canada, days after Liu shot a video as part of Google TV's "Watch with Me" marketing campaign. NBA athletes Giannis Antetokounmpo and Magic Johnson also serve as brand ambassadors for the phones in the U.S., with tennis player Leylah Fernandez doing the same in Canada. In February 2022, Google released a commercial titled "Seen on Pixel" which advertised the Pixel 6's Real Tone feature, ahead of its airing during Super Bowl LVI. It featured a then-unreleased song by Lizzo entitled "If You Love Me". Directed by Joshua Kissi and created in collaboration with advertising agency Gut Miami, the 60-second advertisement marked the company's first Pixel-related Super Bowl spot, and was noted by GLAAD as the only Super Bowl LVI commercial featuring LGBTQ people. Other promotions include Pixel 6 socks and a Tensor sticker for "Pixel Superfans", as well as a Pixel 6-themed tarot deck for #TeamPixel members ahead of Christmas in 2021.

== Reception ==
=== Critical response ===
The Pixel 6 and Pixel 6 Pro received much attention prior to its launch. Ben Schoon of 9to5Google highlighted the potential of the new Tensor chip, finding Google's premature reveal of the devices to be a "show of confidence" in the Pixel 6 series. Michael L. Hicks of Android Central believed that the Pixel 6 and Pixel 6 Pro could appeal to iPhone users, urging Google to rethink its marketing strategy, while Sareena Dayaram of CNET opined that the phones were "more exciting" than Apple's iPhone 13. Commentators also noted the increased anticipation of the Pixel 6 series in comparison to earlier generations of the Pixel smartphone line, attributing this to its early reveal as well as the announcement of the Tensor chip.

Both phones received generally positive reviews following their release. Julian Chokkattu of Wired and Dan Seifert of The Verge praised their performance, cameras, and battery life, but criticized the speed of the fingerprint scanner and the large sizes of both models. On the contrary, Patrick Holland and Andrew Laxon of CNET took issue with the phones' battery life, though they both praised the phones' camera and design. Lanxon also highlighted the premium specifications of the Pixel 6 Pro, including the triple-camera setup, and believed it to be on par with the iPhone 13 and Samsung's Galaxy S21. Similarly, Jacon Krol of CNN Underscored and Sam Rutherford of Gizmodo appreciated the phones' design and cameras, with Krol declaring them "the best Android phones you can buy", though Rutherford also noted the slow fingerprint sensor and lack of a headphone jack. Philip Michaels and Jordan Palmer of Tom's Guide praised the phones' affordable pricing, the Tensor chip, and the debut of Android 12, but criticized the fingerprint scanner and battery life. Writing for TechRadar, David Lumb and James Peckham commended the phones' design, build, and cameras but found the battery life and storage subpar. Marques Brownlee praised the phones' competitive pricing, selfie cameras, and software features, but also noted the slow fingerprint sensor and poor battery life.

=== Commercial reception ===
Google accommodated the increased interest for the Pixel 6 and Pixel 6 Pro by signing partnership agreements with more than 45 wireless carriers and retailers across nine countries. Shortly after the phones became available for pre-order, both the online Google Store and the Google Fi store suffered temporary outages. Google attributed delayed shipping times for the Pro model to unexpectedly high demand on the Google Store, with other carriers also facing shipping delays.

In December 2021, a report indicated that the Pixel 6 and Pixel 6 Pro experienced greater carrier sales numbers during its first month of availability in comparison to prior models, while smartphone accessory manufacturer Bellroy announced that its phone cases for the Pixel 6 series were its most popular products of all time. During Alphabet's quarterly earnings investor call in February 2022, Google and Alphabet CEO Sundar Pichai touted "record" sales numbers for the company's 2021 Pixel phones, especially the Pixel 6 series; however, a later study conducted by Counterpoint Research revealed that the Pixel line may have only experienced moderate year-over-year growth in comparison to the Pixel 5. In March, the International Data Corporation (IDC) analyzed that the introduction of the Tensor chip on the Pixel 6 series had been a factor in allowing MediaTek to overtake Qualcomm as the most popular Android chip manufacturer in the U.S., though the latter disputed the report. Another report published by Counterpoint Research the same month revealed that Tensor made up approximately one to two percent of the high-end system-on-chip market.

In April 2022, a report from market research firm Wave7 claimed that the Pixel 6 and Pixel 6 Pro had experienced low carrier sales, with Google offering unusually high "kickbacks to salespeople" and Verizon finding the most success with the phones. Pichai stated that the Pixel 6 series were the fastest-selling Pixel devices ever, with the company further revealing during the 2022 Google I/O keynote on May 11 that the Pixel 6 and Pixel 6 Pro had been sold more than the Pixel 4 and Pixel 5 combined. Data from the IDC in October 2022 revealed that Google had sold approximately 3.75 million units of the Pixel 6 series globally by then. The Pixel 6 series was instrumental in allowing Google's smartphone market share in North America to increase by 380% during the first quarter of 2022, becoming the fifth-largest smartphone manufacturer in both North America and the United Kingdom for the first time; the next quarter, Pixel sales increased by 230% in North America, acquiring 2% of the smartphone market on the continent.

== Future ==
The Pixel 6 and Pixel 6 Pro were succeeded by the Pixel 7 and Pixel 7 Pro in October 2022, with the phones first previewed during the 2022 I/O keynote. They were powered by the second-generation Tensor chip and shipped with Android 13. At I/O, Google also announced the Pixel 6a, a mid-range variant of the Pixel 6 series, which launched in July.
