= Hot pixel (telescopes) =

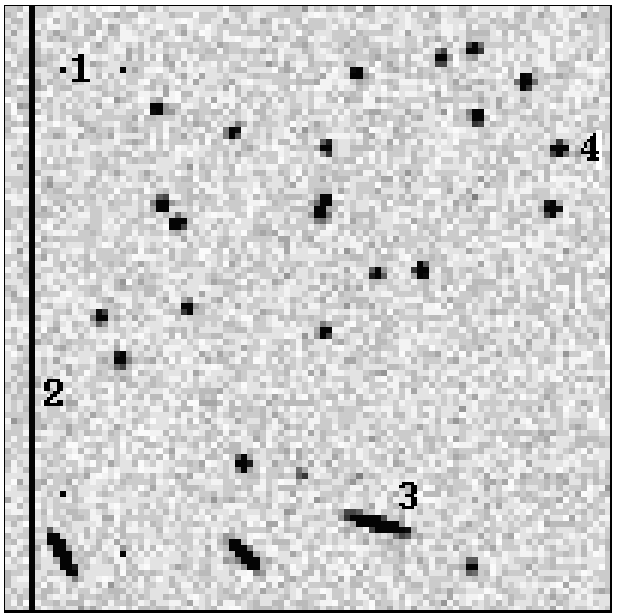
The simulated image with stars and other sources (legend: No. 1 — hot pixel, No. 2 — bad column, No. 3 — cosmics, No. 4 — star)

A hot pixel or bright dot defect is a pixel that outputs many more electrons than others at the same input signal in a charge-coupled device (CCD) or CMOS sensor. In the simulated image, the hot pixels are the sources of the salt-and-pepper noise. In the definition of the HST ACS, A pixel above 0.14 e¯/pixel/second is considered a "hot" pixel.

A warm pixel is a pixel that has negative bias values. In the definition of the Hubble Space Telescope, a pixel below the hot pixels range but above 0.06 e¯/pixel/second is considered a "warm" pixel.

== See also ==
- Defective pixel
