= Pixel 5 =

Android smartphone model developed by Google

- Diagram of the Pixel 5
- Brand: Google
- Manufacturer: Foxconn
- Type: Smartphone
- Series: Pixel
- First released: October 15, 2020; 5 years ago
- Availability by region: October 15, 2020: Australia; France; Germany; Ireland; Japan; United Kingdom; Taiwan; October 29, 2020: United States; Canada
- Discontinued: August 20, 2021; 4 years ago
- Units sold: 1.92 million (as of Oct. 2022)
- Predecessor: Pixel 4
- Successor: Pixel 6
- Related: Pixel 5a
- Compatible networks: GSM/EDGE, UMTS/HSPA+, CDMA EVDO Rev A, WCDMA, LTE, LTE Advanced, 5G
- Form factor: Slate
- Dimensions: H: 144.7 mm (5.70 in); W: 70.4 mm (2.77 in); D: 8 mm (0.31 in)
- Weight: 151 g (5.3 oz)
- Operating system: Android 11; Upgradable to Android 14
- System-on-chip: Qualcomm Snapdragon 765G
- CPU: Octa-core (1 × 2.4 GHz Kryo 475 Prime & 1 × 2.2 GHz Kryo 475 Gold & 6 × 1.8 GHz Kryo 475 Silver)
- GPU: Adreno 620
- Memory: 8 GB LPDDR4X
- Storage: 128 GB UFS 2.1
- Removable storage: None
- SIM: Nano SIM and eSIM
- Battery: 4080 mAh
- Rear camera: Sony Exmor IMX363 12.2 MP (1.4 μm) with f/1.7 lens, 27 mm (wide), 1/2.55" + 16 MP (1.0 μm) with f/2.2 lens, 107° (ultrawide), Dual Pixel PDAF, optical and electronic image stabilization, LED flash, Live HDR+, panorama, 1080p at 30/60/120 fps, 4K at 30/60 fps
- Front camera: 8 MP with f/2.0 lens, 24 mm (wide), 1.12 μm, 1080p at 30 fps, Auto-HDR
- Display: 6 in (152.4 mm) FHD+ 1080p OLED at 432 ppi, 2340 × 1080 pixel resolution (13:6), Corning Gorilla Glass 6, 90 Hz refresh rate, HDR10+
- Sound: Stereo speakers
- Connectivity: USB-C, Wi-Fi 5 (a/b/g/n/ac) 2.4 + 5.0 GHz, Bluetooth 5.0 + LE, NFC, eSIM capable
- Data inputs: Dual band GNSS (GPS/GLONASS/BeiDou/Galileo)
- Water resistance: IP68, up to 1.5 m (4.9 ft) for 30 minutes
- Codename: Redfin
- Other: 18 W fast charging; 12 W Qi wireless charging; Titan M security module
- Website: Google Pixel 5

The Pixel 5 is an Android-based smartphone designed, developed, and marketed by Google as part of the Google Pixel product line. It serves as the successor to the Pixel 4. It was officially announced on September 30, 2020 at the "Launch Night In" event alongside the Pixel 4a (5G) and released in the United States on October 29, 2020. It is the first flagship smartphone in the Pixel line-up not to feature an XL version. On October 19, 2021, it was succeeded by the Pixel 6 and Pixel 6 Pro.

== Specifications ==
=== Design and hardware ===
The Pixel 5 is constructed using a "100% recycled aluminum enclosure" and Gorilla Glass 6 for the screen. The device is available in Just Black and Sorta Sage colors, both of which have a matte finish. The housing has a thick coating of plastic, while the power button is anodized with a metallic finish. The bottom of the device has a USB-C connector, which is used for charging and audio output. It has stereo speakers, one of which is an under display unit, with the other speaker located to the right of the USB-C port. The back houses a capacitive fingerprint reader, which had been removed on the Pixel 4.

The Pixel 5 uses the mid-range Qualcomm Snapdragon 765G system-on-chip (consisting of eight Kryo 475 cores, an Adreno 620 GPU and a Hexagon 696 DSP), with 8 GB of LPDDR4X RAM and 128 GB of non-expandable UFS 2.1 internal storage. The Snapdragon 765G allows for standard 5G connectivity; both "sub-6" and millimeter-wave (mmWave) networks are supported.

The Pixel 5 has a 4080 mAh battery, a significant increase over its predecessor's 2800 mAh battery. It is capable of fast-charging at up to 18 W, and supports Qi wireless charging as well as reverse wireless charging. This is enabled through a cutout in the back panel for the wireless charging coil, covered by bio-resin. It retains the water protection rating of IP68 under IEC standard 60529. The Pixel 4's Motion Sense capabilities and facial recognition have been omitted, as well as Active Edge and Pixel Neural Core.

The Pixel 5 features a 6-inch (152 mm) 1080p OLED display with HDR10+ support, that operates at a refresh rate of up to 90 Hz; it dynamically adjusts depending on content to preserve battery life. The display has a 19.5:9 aspect ratio, and adopts a design aesthetic similar to the Pixel 4a, with slim uniform bezels and a circular cutout in the upper left-hand corner for the front-facing camera.

The Pixel 5 includes dual rear-facing cameras located within a raised square module. While the wide camera is unchanged, it includes an ultrawide lens replacing the Pixel 4's telephoto lens. The wide 28 mm 77° f/1.7 lens has the Sony Exmor IMX363 12.2 MP sensor, while the ultrawide 107° f/2.2 lens has a 16 MP sensor; both sensors are shared with the Pixel 4a (5G). The front-facing camera uses an 8 MP sensor. Along with the Pixel 4a (5G), it is the first Pixel phone capable of recording 4K@60fps, as previous Pixel phones were limited to 30 fps. Although it lacks Pixel Neural Core, Pixel Visual Core has been reworked to support Live HDR+ and Dual Exposure features present on the Pixel 4. Additional software improvements include a new Portrait Light mode, Portrait Mode for Night Sight, a Cinematic Pan setting and HDR+ with exposure bracketing.

=== Software ===
The Pixel 5 shipped with Android 11 and version 8.0 of the Google Camera app at launch, with features such as Call Screen and a Personal Safety app. A new feature introduced concurrently on the Pixel 4a (5G) is Extreme Battery Saver, which stops background app processing and only lets essential apps run. It will be available on older Pixel models as a part of a future software update. It is expected to receive 3 years of major OS upgrades, with support extending until 2023.

The Pixel 5 is the last Pixel phone to ship with unlimited storage in high definition on Google Photos, with subsequent phones (beginning with the Pixel 5a and Pixel 6 series) no longer including this offer.
