= Pixel 3a =

2019 Android smartphone designed by Google

Pixel 3a; Pixel 3a XL

- Diagrams of the Pixel 3a (L) and Pixel 3a XL (R)
- Brand: Google
- Manufacturer: Foxconn
- Type: Pixel 3a: Smartphone; Pixel 3a XL: Phablet
- Series: Pixel
- First released: May 7, 2019; 7 years ago
- Discontinued: July 1, 2020; 5 years ago
- Successor: Pixel 4a
- Related: Pixel 3
- Compatible networks: GSM/EDGE, UMTS/HSPA+, CDMA EVDO Rev A, WCDMA, LTE, LTE Advanced
- Form factor: Slate
- Dimensions: Pixel 3a: H: 151.3 mm (5.96 in); W: 70.1 mm (2.76 in); D: 8.2 mm (0.32 in); Pixel 3a XL: H: 160.1 mm (6.30 in); W: 76.1 mm (3.00 in); D: 8.2 mm (0.32 in)
- Weight: Pixel 3a: 147 g (5.2 oz); Pixel 3a XL: 167 g (5.9 oz)
- Operating system: Android 9 "Pie"; Last: Android 12L
- System-on-chip: Qualcomm Snapdragon 670
- CPU: 2.0 GHz + 1.7 GHz, 64-Bit Octa-Core
- GPU: Adreno 615
- Memory: 4 GB LPDDR4X
- Storage: 64 GB eMMC 5.1
- Removable storage: None
- SIM: Nano SIM and eSIM
- Battery: Pixel 3a: 3000 mAh; Pixel 3a XL: 3700 mAh
- Charging: 18 W fast charging
- Rear camera: 12.2 MP (1.4 μm) with f/1.8 lens, Dual Pixel Phase autofocus, optical and electronic image stabilization 1080p at 30/60/120 fps, 720p at 30/60/240 fps, 4K at 30 fps
- Front camera: 8 MP with f/2.0 lens and 84° lens, fixed focus, 1080p at 30 fps, 720p at 30 fps, 480p at 30 fps
- Display: Pixel 3a: 5.6 in (142 mm) FHD+ OLED at 441 ppi, 2220 × 1080 resolution (37∶18); Pixel 3a XL: 6.0 in (152 mm) FHD+ OLED at 402 ppi, 2160 × 1080 (2∶1) resolution Both displays have Asahi Dragontrail Glass
- Sound: Stereo speakers
- Connectivity: Wi-Fi 2.4 GHz + 5.0 GHz 802.11a/b/g/n/ac, Bluetooth 5.0 + LE, NFC, GPS (GLONASS, Galileo, QZSS, BeiDou)
- Data inputs: USB-C 2.0
- Codename: Sargo (Pixel 3a); Bonito (Pixel 3a XL)
- Other: Titan M security module
- Website: Google Pixel 3a

The Pixel 3a and Pixel 3a XL are a pair of Android-based smartphones designed, developed, and marketed by Google as part of its Google Pixel product line. They collectively serve as mid-range variants of the Pixel 3 and Pixel 3 XL. They were officially announced on May 7, 2019 at Google I/O, seven months after the announcement of the original Pixel 3 lineup, and were released on the same day. On August 3, 2020, it was succeeded by the Pixel 4a.

== Specifications ==
=== Design ===
The Pixel 3a and Pixel 3a XL come in three colors: 'Just Black' (all black), 'Clearly White' (white with an orange power button), and 'Purple-ish' (lavender, with a neon yellow power button). Both the Pixel 3a and the Pixel 3a XL resemble the smaller Pixel 3, following criticism of the Pixel 3 XL's notch. They look similar to their more expensive counterparts, but both have a polycarbonate unibody construction and Asahi Dragontrail glass, rather than Corning Gorilla Glass which is used on most other smartphones.

=== Hardware ===
The Pixel 3a and Pixel 3a XL come with the Snapdragon 670 chip and 4 GB of RAM, with 64 GB of non-expandable eMMC internal storage. Both phones lack wireless charging, water resistance and the Pixel Visual Core (PVC), all of which are standard on the Pixel 3. They feature stereo speakers and a 3.5 mm headphone jack, the latter of which was omitted on the Pixel 2 and Pixel 3. Unlike the Pixel 2 and Pixel 3, only one of the speakers is front-firing, with the other speaker on the bottom. A USB-C port is used on both for charging and connecting other accessories. Both phones also have Active Edge, where squeezing the sides of the phone activates Google Assistant, which debuted with the Pixel 2 and Pixel 2 XL.

==== Camera ====
The Pixel 3a and Pixel 3a XL have a 12.2 megapixel rear camera, which is the same unit found on the Pixel 3, and a single 8 megapixel front-facing camera, lacking the second wide-angle sensor. They feature many of the same photography features as the Pixel 3. Some of these features of Google Camera include:

- Night Sight - dramatically improves low light performance with no flash or tripod.
  - Astrophotography - Google updated the Pixel 3a with an improved Night Sight featuring an astrophotography mode.
- Super Res Zoom - employs super-resolution techniques to increase the resolution beyond what the sensor and lens combination would traditionally achieve using subtle shifts from handheld shake and optical image stabilization.
- Top Shot - takes a burst of HDR+ photos and automatically picks the best shots. An update added Top Shot for short videos.
- Google Lens - recognizes objects and text seen on the Pixel 3a's and Pixel 3a XL's camera.

The Pixel 3a's Google Photos capabilities are more restrictive than the Pixel 3, being limited to free "high quality" backups; full resolution images and videos count towards the Google Drive quota.

=== Software ===
Pixel 3a and Pixel 3a XL ship with Android 9.0 Pie at launch and is upgradable to Android 12L with its last official software update released in September 2022, though third-party operating systems such as Ubuntu Touch can be installed.

The Pixel 3a and Pixel 3a XL were updated bringing several features from the Pixel 4 including: Live captions, Google Recorder, New Google Assistant, Astrophotography mode and Top Shot for short videos.

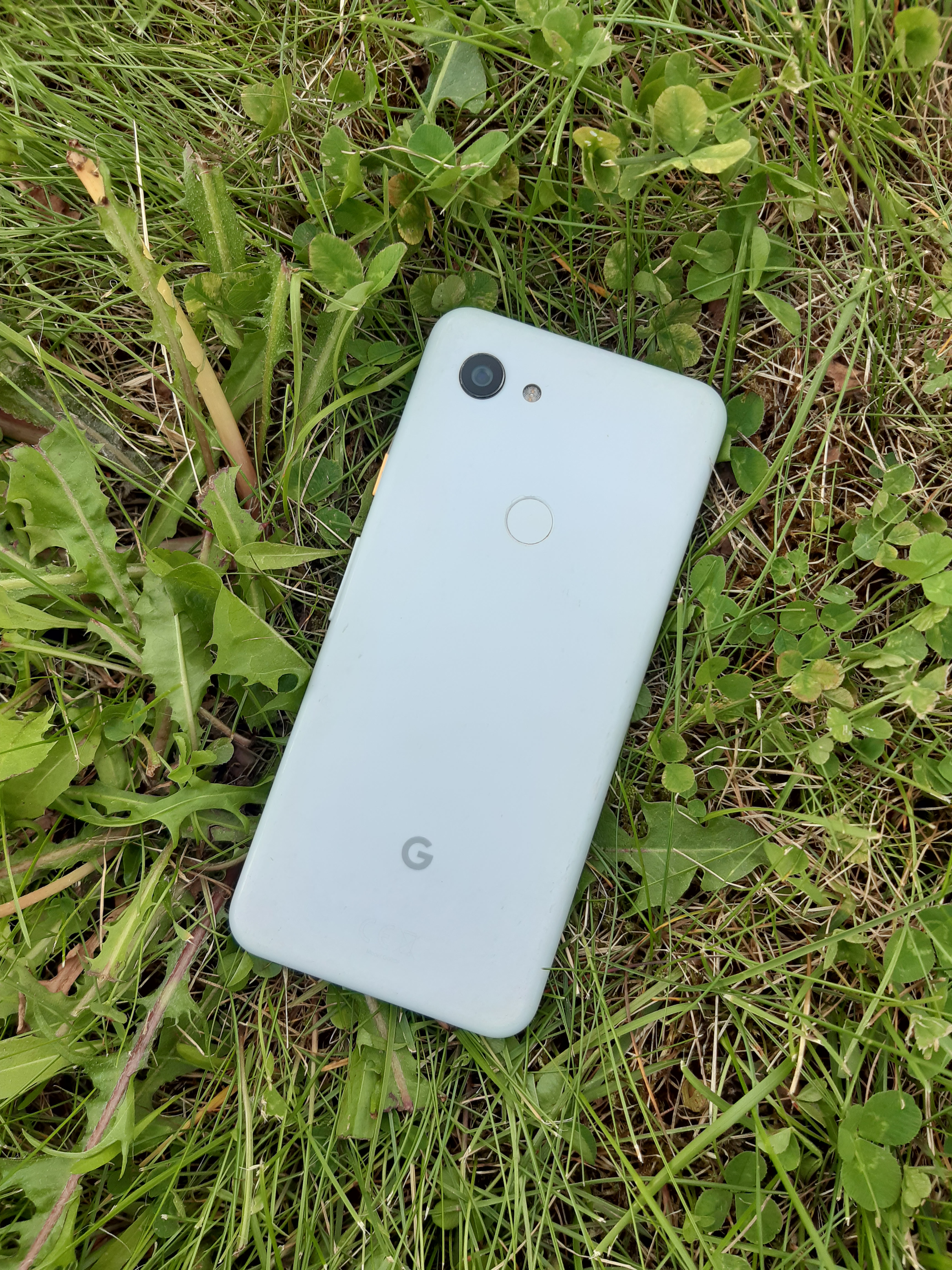
The back side on the Pixel 3a

=== Pricing ===
The Pixel 3a sold at an MSRP of US$399 and the Pixel 3a XL at an MSRP of US$479. That makes them the cheapest Pixel phones to date at the point of their release, with only the older Google Nexus series having cheaper models.

=== Models ===
Model	Type	Region	SKUs		
Model	Type	Region	Just Black	Clearly White	Purple-ish
G020A	Pixel 3a XL	Verizon	GA00661-US		GA00663-US
G020B	Pixel 3a XL	UK, Europe, and APAC			
G020C	Pixel 3a XL	North America	GA00664-US	GA00665-US	GA00666-US
G020D	Pixel 3a XL	Japan			
G020E	Pixel 3a	Verizon	GA00652-US		GA00654-US
G020F	Pixel 3a	UK, Europe, and APAC			
G020G	Pixel 3a	North America	GA00655-US	GA00656-US	GA00657-US
G020H	Pixel 3a	Japan			

=== Cellular networks ===
Pixel 3a and Pixel 3a XL Region Version	Bands			
Pixel 3a and Pixel 3a XL Region Version	GSM (2G)	CDMA (3G)	UMTS (3G)	LTE (4G)
North America	850, 900, 1800, 1900	BC0, BC1, BC10	1-2, 4-5, 8	1-5, 7-8, 12-14, 17, 20, 25-26, 28-30, 38, 40-41, 66, 71
Verizon	850, 900, 1800, 1900	BC0, BC1, BC10	1-2, 4-5, 8	1-5, 7-8, 12-13, 17, 20, 25-26, 28, 32, 38, 40-41, 66
UK, Europe, and APAC	850, 900, 1800, 1900	BC0, BC1, BC10	1-2, 4-5, 8	1-5, 7-8, 12-13, 17, 20, 25-26, 28, 32, 38, 40-41, 66
Japan	850, 900, 1800, 1900	—N/a	1-2, 4-6, 8, 19	1-5, 8, 12-13, 17-19, 21, 26, 28, 38, 41

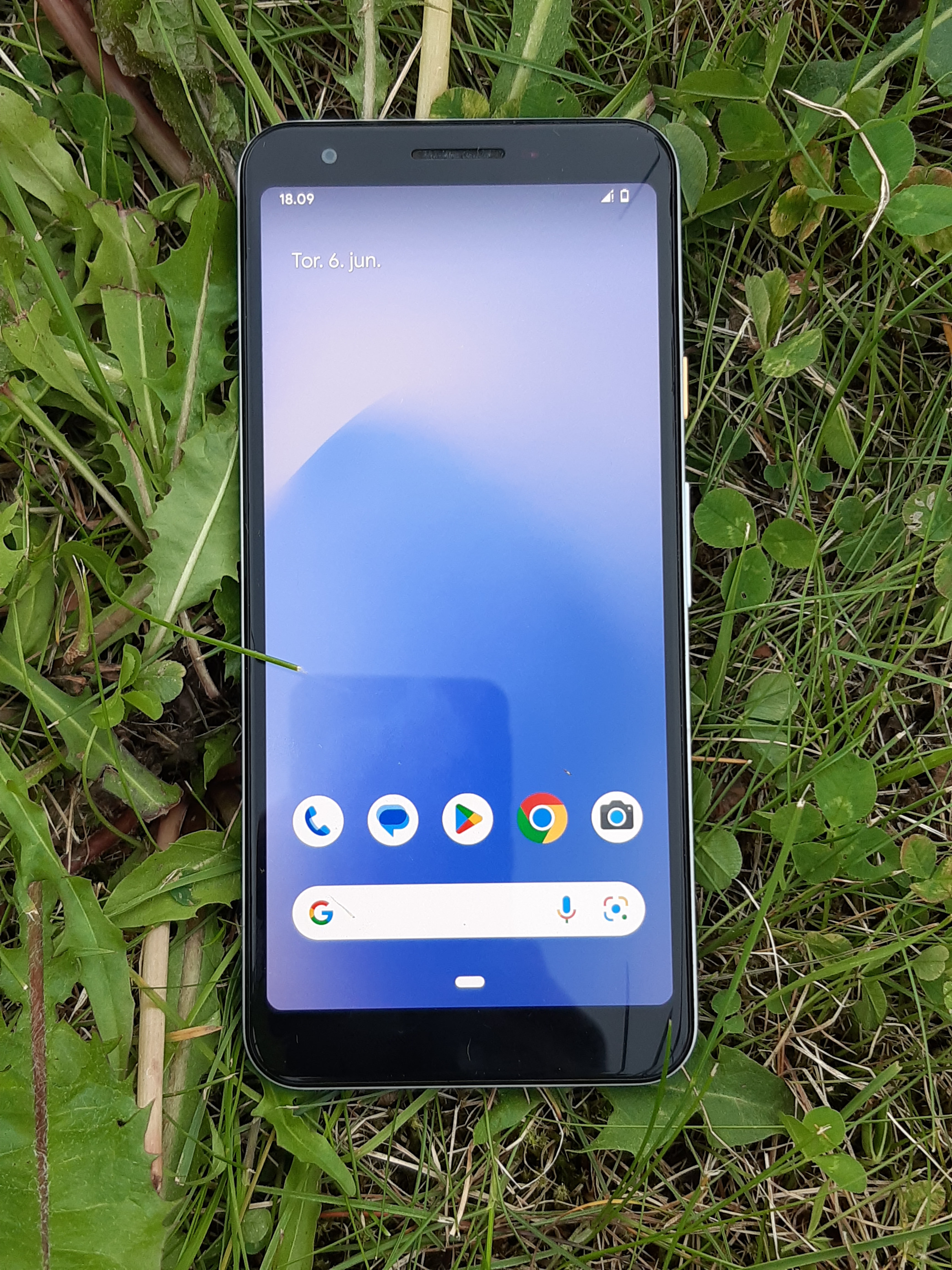
The Pixel Launcher on the Pixel 3a

== Reception ==
The Pixel 3a's camera quality was highly praised, more so considering the device's price point, with Tom's Guide calling it "the new midrange benchmark" for cameras. Tom's Guide gave the Pixel 3a an Editor's Choice award and a rating of 4.5/5, concluding that it "has far and away the best camera, software and display you could ever hope to get in a $400 phone". The Verge was similarly positive, giving both the 3a and the 3a XL an 8/10, stating that "[it] takes photos that are nearly indistinguishable from what you get out of a Pixel 3". The battery life and build quality were praised as well, while reviewers were critical of the slower processor and lack of wireless charging and water resistance.

The 3a received an overall score of 101 from DxOMark (matching the iPhone XR and 1 point short of the Pixel 3), with a photo score of 103 and a video score of 98.

The 3a and 3a XL resulted in Google's smartphone sales doubling in the second quarter of 2019.

== Issues ==
- Some users have reported that turning off Digital Wellbeing improves performance. The issue affects other Pixel devices as well, although Google claims Digital Wellbeing does not negatively affect performance.
- Pixel 3a and 3a XL have experienced power issues where some users have their phone randomly shut down.
- Manufacturing defects have also been found on some units, with crooked cutouts at the bottom for the speakers and USB-C port, the latter of which could potentially interfere with charging.
