= Android 13 =

2022 Android mobile operating system

- Version of the Android operating system

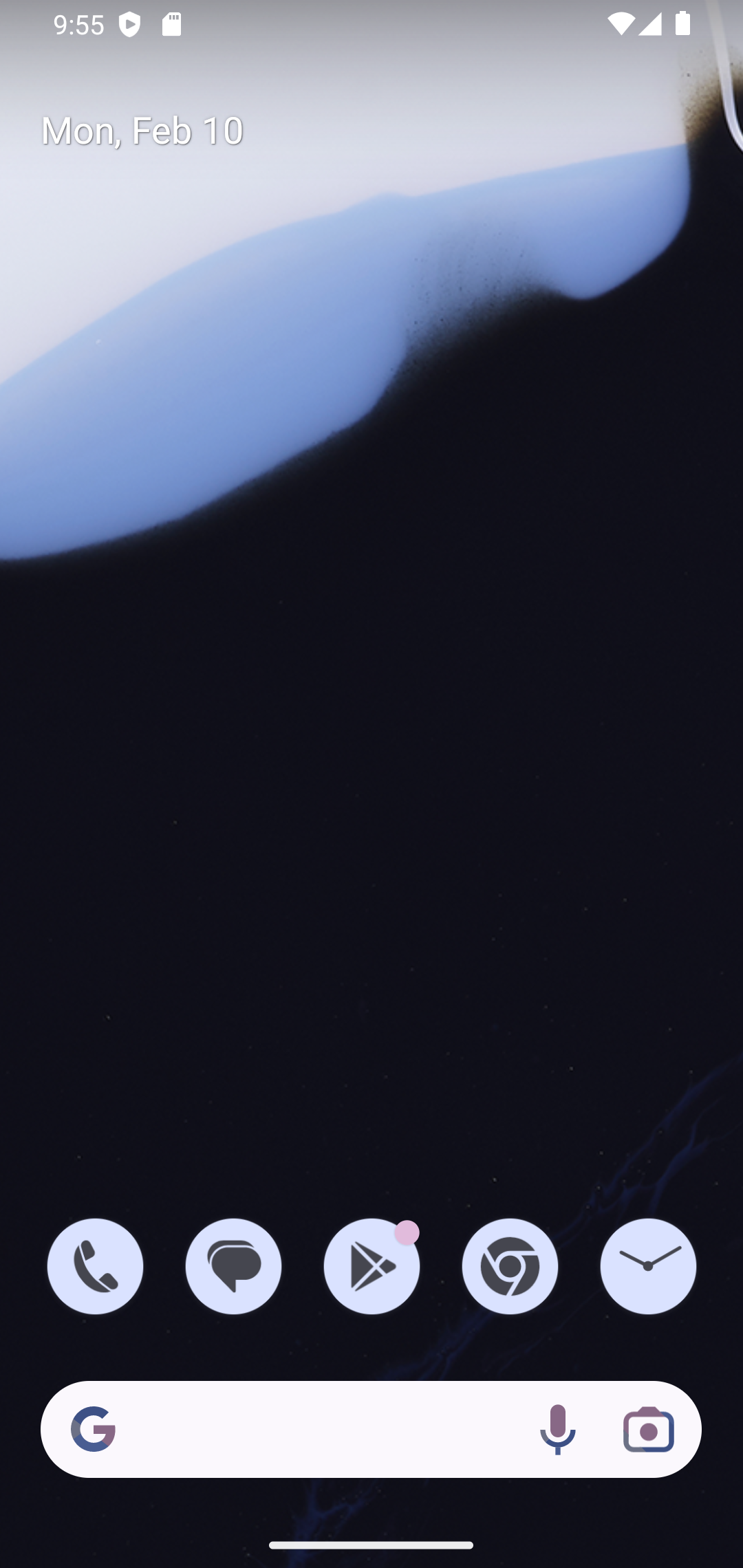
- Android 13 homescreen on Google Pixel
- Developer: Google
- OS family: Android
- General availability: August 15, 2022; 4 years ago
- Final release: 13.0.0_r33 (TSV1.220628.088) / December 1, 2025; 11 months ago
- Final preview: Beta 4.1 (TPB4.220624.008) / July 25, 2022; 4 years ago
- Kernel type: Monolithic (Linux)
- Preceded by: Android 12
- Succeeded by: Android 14
- Official website: android.com/android-13/

Support status
- Unsupported as of December 1, 2025; Google Play Services supported

Android 13 is the thirteenth major release and the 20th version of Android, the mobile operating system developed by the Open Handset Alliance led by Google. It was released to the public and the Android Open Source Project (AOSP) on August 15, 2022. The first devices to ship with Android 13 were the Pixel 7 and 7 Pro.

As of October 2026, 10.98% of Android devices run Android 13, making it the 4th most widely used version of Android.

== History ==
Android 13's Developer Preview logo

Android 13 (internally codenamed Tiramisu) was announced in an Android blog posted on February 10, 2022, and the first Developer Preview was immediately released for the Google Pixel series (from Pixel 4 to Pixel 6, dropping support for the Pixel 3 and Pixel 3a). It was released about 4 months after the stable version of Android 12. Developer Preview 2 followed later, releasing in March. Beta 1 was released on April 26, 2022. Google released beta 2 during Google I/O on May 11, 2022. Two more beta versions were planned for release in June and July. Platform stability was reached in June, with Beta 3. The final release of Android 13 began on August 15 when the update was made available to Pixel phones and pushed to the Android Open Source Project.

== Features ==
=== Privacy ===
Android 13 includes several new features intended to enhance user privacy, both user-facing and developer-facing.

A new media picker is added, which improves privacy by allowing users to choose which photos and videos apps have access to. Most apps have not implemented this picker yet. In addition, Android 13 does not allow apps to access the "Android" system folder. A new permission, NEARBY_WIFI_DEVICES, separated the Wi-Fi and GPS permissions that were bundled into a single "Location" setting. This change means apps can now search for nearby devices and networks without needing to request access to broader navigational systems.

Also, a new runtime permission feature is being added to apps sending non-exempt notifications, allowing users to focus on the notifications most important to them.

=== User experience ===
Apps are now required to request permission from the user before they can send notifications.

Small changes to dialog windows, such as the Internet toggle, have been made to better align with the design language. The media player has been redesigned, now using the album cover as a background and including more user controls. The multiple users feature has been improved, with the added option of selecting which apps can be accessed by the guest user. App data is sandboxed for each user, so no information is shared.

=== New features ===
The number of active apps is now shown at the bottom of the notifications panel; tapping it opens a detailed panel that lets the user stop each app.

The new Gabeldorsche (Note: Derivates from eponymous Harold son's name in Nordic languages (nl:Sven Gaffelbaard).) Bluetooth stack is now enabled by default. Support for Bluetooth LE Audio and the LC3 audio codec, which enables receiving and sharing audio between multiple Bluetooth devices simultaneously; it can also improve the audio quality and battery life of the connected devices, as long as they also support it. This version opens the support for third-party apps to use themed "Material You" icons. Long-pressing and dragging a notification will allow the notification to open in split-screen view. This feature is available on phones and tablets. Android 13 also adds support for WiFi 7, which is intended to decrease latency, buffering, lag, and congestion.

As of Beta 2, the Pixel Launcher includes a new "unified" search bar that can return results from the internet as well as local apps and activities. It seems that Google will be expanding the capabilities of this search tool in future releases.

Android 13 allows users to change the language for a specific app rather than the entire system. One instance of this feature is changing the language in the YouTube app from American English to Spanish.

=== Tweaks ===
Split Screen mode now persists across app changes so that users can use other apps and the phone launcher, and split-screen apps will stay paired together in the Overview menu. Animations have been improved, notably the fingerprint scanner glow on the Pixel 6 series. Overflow notifications on the lock screen are also housed in a dynamically sized pill rather than a bar, and the 2-line stacked clock is slightly smaller. The app label font has been changed in the Pixel Launcher, and subtle haptics have been added throughout the user experience. The Android version has been changed to "Tiramisu" in settings and the Quick Settings panel. As of Developer Preview 2, "Tiramisu" is replaced with "13". The unified search bar includes new, smoother animations and transitions.

Many of the changes are from Android 12.1 "12L", such as the dock displayed on large screens, and other improvements for large-format devices. These are mainly intended for foldables and tablets, but they can be enabled on phones by changing the DPI settings.

== Platform ==
Android 13 ART was updated with a new garbage collector (GC) utilizing the Linux userfaultfd system call. It reduces memory pressure, compiled code size, jank, and reduces the risk of killing apps because of low memory during GC. Other changes improve app startup and performance. Because of the Mainline project, Android 12 ART will also be updated.

== See also ==
- Android version history
