= Android 12 =

2021 Android mobile operating system

- Version of the Android operating system

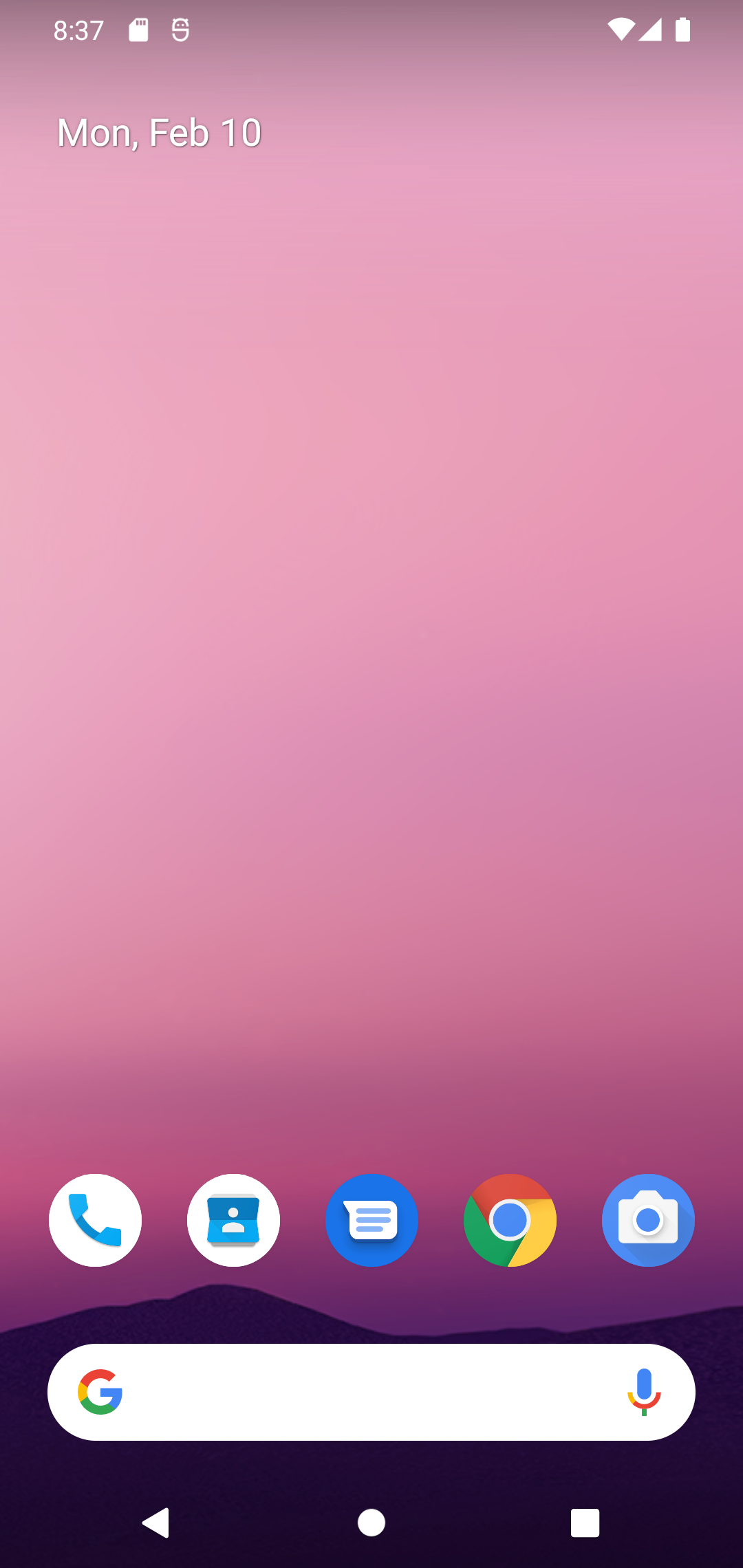
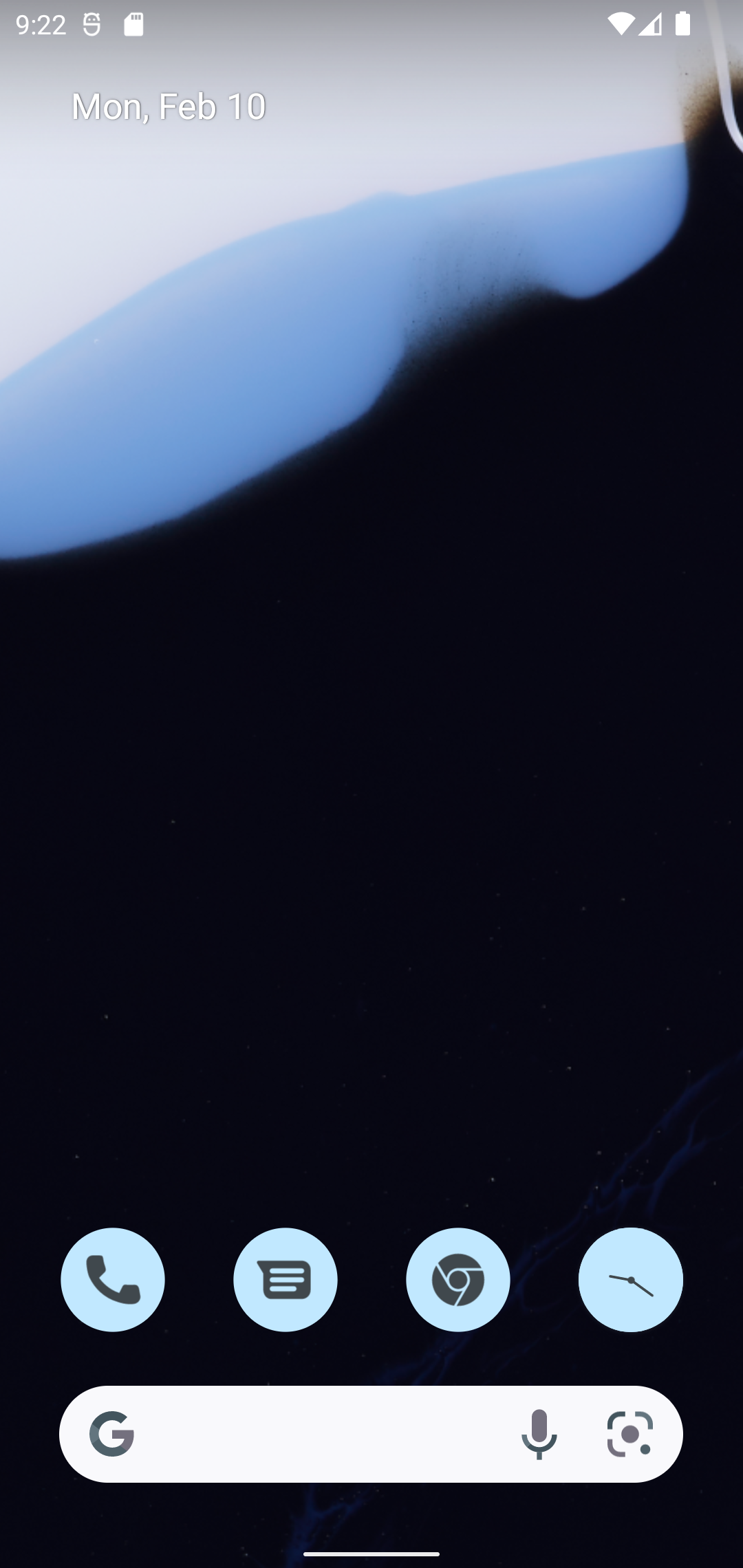
- Screenshots of Android 12 with Pixel Launcher
- Developer: Google
- OS family: Android
- Released to manufacturing: October 4, 2021; 5 years ago
- General availability: October 19, 2021; 4 years ago March 7, 2022; 4 years ago (on Android 12L)
- Final release: 12.0.0_r69 (SSV1.210916.103) / March 3, 2025; 19 months ago
- Final preview: Beta 5 (SPB5.210812.002) / September 8, 2021; 5 years ago
- Kernel type: Monolithic (Linux)
- Preceded by: Android 11
- Succeeded by: Android 13
- Official website: www.android.com/android-12/

Support status
- Unsupported as of March 3, 2025; Google Play Services supported

Android 12 is the twelfth major release and 19th version of Android, the mobile operating system developed by the Open Handset Alliance led by Google. The first beta was released on May 18, 2021. Android 12 was publicly released on October 4, 2021, through the Android Open Source Project (AOSP), and was released to supported Google Pixel devices on October 19, 2021. The first phones to have Android 12 were the Google Pixel 6 and 6 Pro.

As of June 2026, 9.83% of Android devices run Android 12, making it the fifth-most widely used version of Android.

== History ==
Android 12's Developer Preview logo

Android 12 (internally codenamed Snow Cone) was announced in an Android blog posted on February 18, 2021. A developer preview was released immediately, with two additional ones planned the following two months. After that, four monthly beta releases were planned, beginning in May, the last one of them reaching platform stability in August, with general availability coming shortly after that.

The second developer preview was released on March 17, 2021, followed by a third preview on April 21. The first beta build was then released on May 18, 2021. It was followed by beta 2 on June 9, which got a bug-fix update to 2.1 on June 23. The third beta was released on July 14, getting a bug-fix update to 3.1 on July 26. Beta 4 was released on August 11, 2021. A fifth beta, not planned in the original roadmap, was released on September 8, 2021. Android 12's stable version was released on the Android Open Source Project on October 4 before getting its public over-the-air rollout on October 19, coinciding with the launch event for the Pixel 6.

=== Android 12.1/12L ===
In October 2021, Google announced Android 12L, an interim release of Android 12 including improvements specific for foldable phones, tablets, desktop-sized screens and Chromebooks, and modifications to the user interface to tailor it to larger screens. It was planned to launch in early 2022. Developer Preview 1 of Android 12L was released in October 2021, followed by Beta 1 in December 2021, Beta 2 in January 2022, and Beta 3 in February 2022. The stable version of Android 12L was released for devices with large screens on March 29, 2022, along with the redesigned Chrome logo and icon. It was released as "Android 12.1" for Pixel smartphones on the same date beside the Pixel 6 and Pixel 6 Pro.

== Features ==
=== User interface ===
Android 12 introduces a major refresh to the operating system's Material Design language, branded as "Material You", which features larger buttons, increased use of animation, and a new style for home screen widgets. A feature, internally codenamed "monet", allows the operating system to automatically generate a wallpaper color theme (basic color theme for Android 12.1/12L) for system menus and supported apps using the colors of the user's wallpaper.

The smart home and Wallet areas added to the power menu in Android 11 have been moved to the notification shade, and Google Assistant is now activated by holding the power button. Android 12 features native support for taking scrolling screenshots.

The screen magnifier feature now supports partial magnification via a floating window and can also be configured to follow text input.

A splash screen is automatically generated for every installed app, which app developers can customise. The Core Splashscreen Jetpack library backports this functionality for older Android versions.

On Android 12.1/12L, the quick buttons were moved to the bottom–right corner of the screen. Also, it brought many changes to the lock screen clock. It moved from left of the screen horizontally to the center of the screen, stacked.

=== Platform ===
Performance improvements have been made to system services, including the window and package managers. The Android Runtime has been added to Project Mainline, allowing it to be serviced via Play Store.

Android 12 adds support for spatial audio and MPEG-H 3D Audio, and supports transcoding HEVC video for backwards compatibility with apps that do not support it. A new API known as HapticGenerator allows the OS to generate haptic feedback from audio on compatible devices.

A "rich content insertion" API eases the ability to transfer formatted text and media between apps, such as via the clipboard. Third-party app stores now can update apps without constantly asking the user for permission.

=== Privacy ===
OS-level machine learning functions are sandboxed within the "Android Private Compute Core", which is expressly prohibited from accessing networks.

Apps requesting location data can now be restricted to having access only to "approximate" location data rather than "precise". Controls to prevent apps from using the camera and microphone system-wide have been added to the quick settings toggles. An indicator will also be displayed on-screen if they are active.

== See also ==
- Android version history
- iOS 15
- Windows 11
- macOS Monterey
