= Pixel 4 =

2019 Android smartphones designed by Google

Pixel 4; Pixel 4 XL

- A diagram of the Pixel 4
- Brand: Google
- Manufacturer: Foxconn
- Type: Pixel 4: Smartphone; Pixel 4 XL: Phablet
- Series: Pixel
- First released: October 24, 2019; 7 years ago
- Discontinued: August 6, 2020; 6 years ago
- Units sold: 5.40 million (as of Oct. 2022)
- Predecessor: Pixel 3
- Successor: Pixel 5
- Related: Pixel 4a
- Compatible networks: GSM/EDGE, UMTS/HSPA+, CDMA EVDO Rev A, WCDMA, LTE, LTE Advanced
- Form factor: Slate
- Dimensions: Pixel 4: H: 147.1 mm (5.79 in) W: 68.8 mm (2.71 in) D: 8.2 mm (0.32 in); Pixel 4 XL: H: 160.4 mm (6.31 in) W: 75.1 mm (2.96 in) D: 8.2 mm (0.32 in)
- Weight: Pixel 4: 162 g (5.7 oz); Pixel 4 XL: 193 g (6.8 oz)
- Operating system: Android 10; Upgradable to Android 13
- System-on-chip: Qualcomm Snapdragon 855
- CPU: Octa-core (1 × 2.84 GHz Kryo 485 Gold Prime & 3 × 2.42 GHz Kryo 485 Gold & 4 × 1.78 GHz Kryo 485 Silver)
- GPU: Adreno 640
- Memory: 6 GB LPDDR4X
- Storage: 64 GB or 128 GB UFS 2.1
- Removable storage: None
- SIM: Nano-SIM and eSIM
- Battery: Pixel 4: 2800 mAh; Pixel 4 XL: 3700 mAh
- Charging: 18 W fast charging; 11 W Qi wireless charging
- Rear camera: Sony Exmor IMX363 12.2 MP (1.4 μm) with f/1.7 lens, 28 mm (wide), 1/2.55" + 16 MP (1.0 μm) with f/2.4 lens, 48 mm (telephoto), Dual Pixel PDAF, optical and electronic image stabilization, 1.7× optical zoom, 8× zoom, Dual-LED flash, Live HDR+, panorama, 1080p at 30/60/120 fps, 4K at 30 fps
- Front camera: 8 MP with f/2.0 lens, 22 mm (ultra wide, 90°), 1.22 μm, 1080p at 30 fps, Auto-HDR + ToF camera
- Display: Pixel 4: 5.7 in (145 mm) FHD+ 1080p P-OLED at 444 ppi, 2280 × 1080 pixel resolution (19:9); Pixel 4 XL: 6.3 in (160 mm) QHD+ 1440p P-OLED at 537 ppi, 3040 × 1440 pixel resolution (19:9); Both: Corning Gorilla Glass 5, dynamic 90 Hz refresh rate
- Sound: Stereo speakers
- Connectivity: Wi-Fi 5 (a/b/g/n/ac) 2.4 + 5.0 GHz, Bluetooth 5.0 + LE, NFC, eSIM capable, USB-C
- Data inputs: Dual band GNSS (GPS/GLONASS/BeiDou/Galileo)
- Water resistance: IP68, up to 1 m (3.3 ft) for 30 minutes
- Codename: Flame (Pixel 4); Coral (Pixel 4 XL)
- Other: Titan M security module; Pixel Neural Core
- Website: Google Pixel 4

The Pixel 4 and Pixel 4 XL are a pair of Android-based smartphones designed, developed, and marketed by Google as part of the Google Pixel product line. They collectively serve as the successors to the Pixel 3 and Pixel 3 XL. They were officially announced on October 15, 2019 at the Made by Google event and released in the United States on October 24, 2019. On September 30, 2020, they were succeeded by the Pixel 5.

== History ==
Google confirmed the device's design in June 2019 after renders of it were leaked online.

In the United States, the Pixel 4 was the first Pixel phone to be offered for sale by all major wireless carriers at launch. Previous flagship Pixel models had launched as exclusives to Verizon and Google Fi; the midrange Pixel 3a was additionally available from Sprint and T-Mobile, but not AT&T, at its launch. As with all other Pixel releases, Google offered unlocked U.S. versions through its website.

The phones were officially announced on October 15, 2019, and released in the United States on October 24, 2019. On January 10, 2020, Pixel 4 price dropped below the Black Friday prices. They were discontinued in August 2020.

== Specifications ==
=== Design and hardware ===
Schematic of Pixel 4's back; the black square in the upper left is the camera module.

The Pixel 4 and 4 XL are constructed using an aluminum frame and Gorilla Glass 5. The devices are available in Just Black, Clearly White, and Oh So Orange colors, with the white and orange models having a matte, "soft touch" glass finish, and the black model having a glossy finish. The frame is painted black on all models, while the power button is accented and made from plastic.

The USB-C connector at the bottom of the device is used for charging and audio output, though neither USB-C headphones nor a USB-C to 3.5 mm jack adapter are included in the box. Both have stereo speakers, but unlike the Pixel 3, only one of the speakers is front-firing, with the other speaker located to the right of the USB-C port. Neither model includes a fingerprint reader; facial recognition (using a dot projector, infrared emitters, and cameras along the top bezel of the device) is the only biometric authentication method offered by the Pixel 4.

Both models use the Qualcomm Snapdragon 855 system-on-chip (consisting of eight Kryo 485 CPU cores, an Adreno 640 GPU and a Hexagon 690 DSP), with 6 GB of LPDDR4X RAM. Models are available with 64 or 128 GB of non-expandable internal storage. Battery sizes differ, with the Pixel 4 using a 2800 mAh cell and the Pixel 4 XL using a 3700 mAh cell. Both are capable of fast-charging at up to 18 W, and support Qi wireless charging. Like their predecessors, the phones have a water protection rating of IPX8 under IEC standard 60529. The Pixel 4 also features the Pixel Neural Core and Knowles 8508A audio processor. The Pixel Neural Core is the successor to the Pixel Visual Core; it, too, uses the Edge TPU architecture.

The Pixel 4 features an OLED display manufactured by Samsung with HDR support, that operates at a refresh rate of up to 90 Hz; it dynamically adjusts depending on content to preserve battery life. Both models use a wider 19:9 aspect ratio, with the Pixel 4 using a 5.7-inch (140 mm) 1080p panel, and the 4 XL using a 6.3-inch (160 mm) 1440p panel. Unlike the Pixel 3 XL, the Pixel 4 XL's display does not contain a cutout, or notch.

The Pixel 4 includes dual rear-facing cameras located within a raised square module. It houses a wide 28 mm 77° f/1.7 lens with the same Sony Exmor IMX363 12.2-megapixel sensor as on the Pixel 3 and 3a, and a second telephoto 48 mm f/2.4 lens with a 16-megapixel sensor. Both are capable of recording video at 4K resolution, but can only do so at 30 fps whereas most competitors support 60 fps as well. In a tweet, Google stated that "We find that the majority of users stick with 1080p, so we focus our energy on improving our quality in this mode, versus enabling a 4k 60 fps mode that could use up to half a gigabyte of storage every minute". Google claims the Pixel 4 can capture 8× zoom at near-optical quality. Additionally, it uses Google Camera 7.1 with software enhancements, including Live HDR+ with dual exposure controls, improved Night Sight with Astrophotography mode and improved Portrait Mode with more realistic Bokeh. It includes a single ultra wide (90°) front-facing camera with an 8-megapixel sensor, unlike the Pixel 3 which included ultra wide (97°) and wide (75°) front-facing cameras, both of which also had 8-megapixel sensors. The Pixel 4's astrophotography mode can stack together 16 exposures, each with an exposure time of 15 seconds.

==== Motion Sense ====
The Pixel 4 marks the introduction of Motion Sense, a radar-based gesture recognition system. It is based on the Project Soli technology developed by Google ATAP as an alternative to light-based systems such as infrared. Motion Sense can be used for detecting a user's proximity to the device to activate the always-on display or power the screen on, and waving gestures that can be used in supported apps (such as skipping tracks in the music player, and an interactive Pokémon demo app).

Due to its use of 60 GHz frequency bands, Google was required to obtain specific regulatory approval for the radar system in all countries that the Pixel 4 is being sold. As such, the feature is geoblocked if the device is detected to be in an unsupported country. On launch, Google stated that support for the feature was currently limited to Australia, Canada, "most European countries", Singapore, Taiwan, and the United States, but that Japan was "coming soon". Google stated that it had no plans to sell the Pixel 4 in India, with the company officially stating a preference to continue marketing the Pixel 3a in the region; media outlets noted that civilian use of the 60 GHz frequency is prohibited in India, unlike in the U.S. and some other countries, where it is considered unlicensed spectrum.

=== Software ===
The Pixel 4 ships with Android 10 and Google Camera 7.1. The devices feature several features powered by their Pixel Neural Core (the successor to the Pixel Visual Core) and Knowles 8508A audio processor. In addition to its existing use for computational photography image processing, they are used by the new Recorder and Live Transcribe apps. Recorder is a voice recorder with live transcription, classification, and searchable sounds. Also the "new" Google Assistant, which contains enhancements to allow for increased client-side recognition of commands that are local to the device (rather than querying Google servers).

While it originally ran Android 10, the device eventually received updates, ultimately supporting Android versions up to Android 13 before its end-of-life support concluded in October 2022.

After Google demonstrated astrophotography sample photos, a scene of San Francisco with the Moon blown out and the woods underexposed was shown. Marc Levoy explained that the difference in light between the Moon and woods was too significant, requiring 19 stops of dynamic range which no phone or DSLR camera was currently capable of performing. He reaffirmed Google's commitment to improving the camera with software updates (a signature of the Pixel line) and said to stay tuned.

== Reception ==
The Pixel 4 received an overall score of 112 from DXOMARK, a 10-point improvement over its predecessor. It had a photo score of 117, a video score of 101, and a selfie score of 92. The camera was particularly praised for its performance in low light situations.

The Pixel 4 and 4 XL were praised by critics for their photography capabilities, the move to 6 GB of RAM from 4 GB, and the 90 Hz refresh rate screen. They were criticized for their poor battery life (especially on the smaller Pixel 4), the low amount of non-expandable storage, the lack of an ultra-wide angle camera lens, the removal of the fingerprint sensor in favor of the secure Face Unlock, the lack of 4K 60 fps video recording, the lack of headphones or an adapter in the box, the Motion Sense system's poor detection, and the high price compared to other flagship smartphones. Google was also criticized for not providing unlimited uncompressed photo and video cloud storage like its Pixel predecessors had.

Ars Technica gave the device a mixed pre-release review, noting that the etched finish of the orange and white models felt stronger than that of the Pixel 3 without compromising its "soft" and "grippy" feel, but that the screen bezels looked "lopsided". The Motion Sense system was panned for its reliance on hand waving gestures that were "so big that it's a cumbersome, tiring, annoying thing to do." This was contrasted with early demonstrations of the technology being able to detect "sub-millimeter motions at high speed and accuracy", noting that Google's admitted need to downsize the radar chip to fit into a smartphone may have compromised its capabilities. Ars Technica's in-depth review concluded that "This year, the Pixel 4 feels like a bunch of software decisions designed to prop up hardware that has been cost-cut to death".

== Issues ==
=== Fixed issues ===
- Videos recorded with third-party apps like Instagram and Snapchat have odd clicking noises in the background.
- The Pixel 4 did not require eye contact with the phone when using facial recognition to unlock the device, raising privacy concerns since the device could be unlocked even if the user's eyes were closed. Google released an update in April 2020 that added the option for eyes open requirement in face unlock.
- The Pixel 4 automatically lowers the display's refresh rate to 60 Hz if the screen brightness is set to 75 percent. Google released a fix for this in the November 2019 update.
- In certain lighting conditions, the Pixel 4's white balance "fix" could result in photos with inaccurate color representation. Google released a fix in the November 2019 update.
