= Pixel Camera =

Camera application developed by Google for Pixel devices

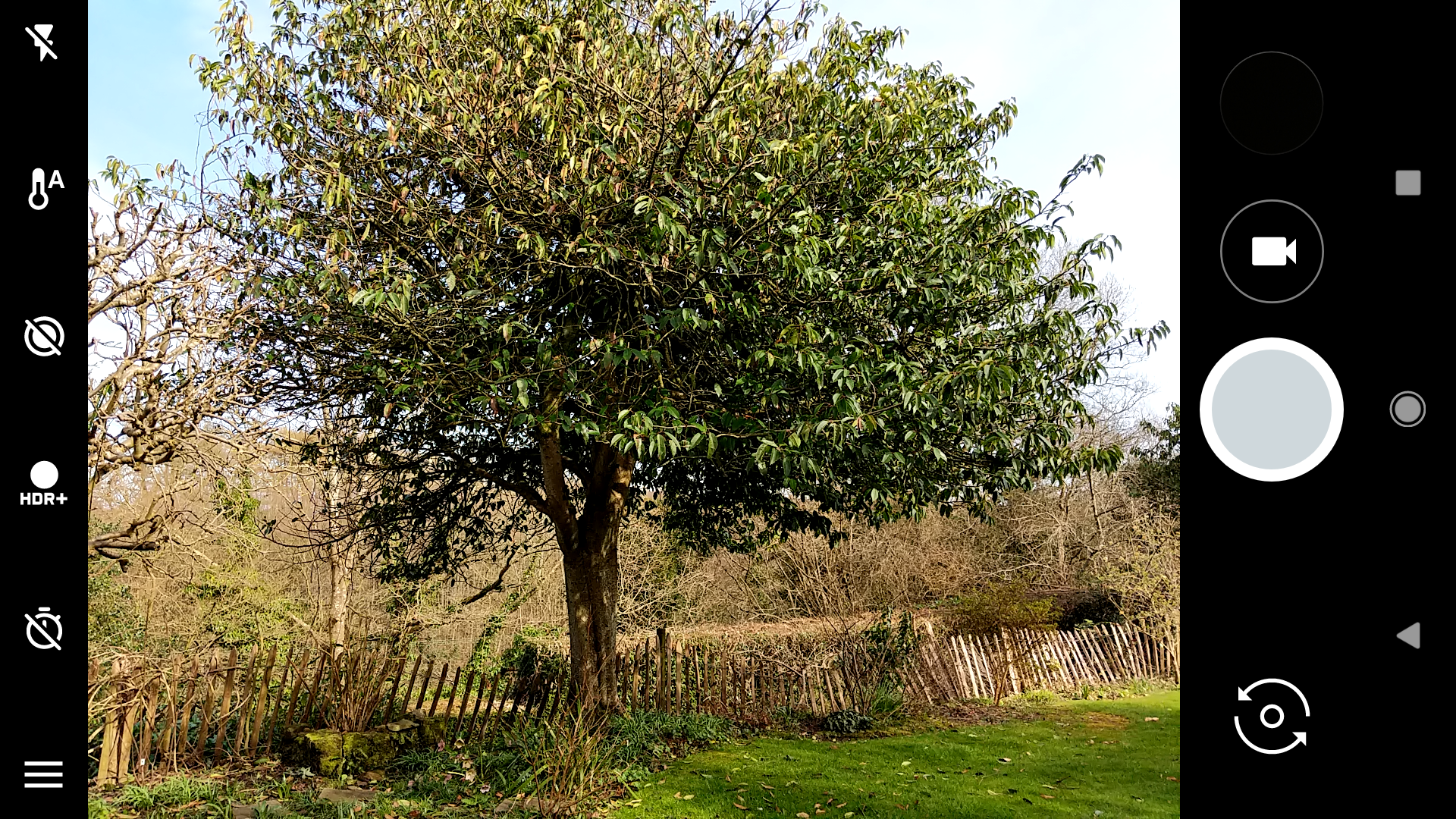
- Google Camera 5.2.019 running on Android Oreo 8.1 on a Google Pixel 2
- Original author: X Development
- Developers: Google, Google Research
- Release: April 16, 2014; 12 years ago
Stable release
- Android: 10.0.081.808198566.40 / September 23, 2025; 13 months ago
- Wear OS: 9.8.084.729276569.02 / March 5, 2025; 19 months ago
- Operating system: Android, Wear OS
- Type: Camera
- License: Proprietary

Pixel Camera is a camera phone application developed by Google for the Android operating system on Google Pixel devices. Development with zoom lenses for the application began in 2011 at the Google X research incubator led by Marc Levoy, which was developing image fusion technology for Google Glass. It was publicly released for Android 4.4+ on the Google Play on April 16, 2014. The app was initially released as Google Camera and supported on all devices running Android 4.4 KitKat and higher. However, in October 2023, coinciding with the release of the Pixel 8 series, it was renamed to Pixel Camera and became officially supported only on Google Pixel devices.

== Features ==
Pixel Camera contains a number of features that can be activated either in the Settings page or on the row of icons at the top of the app.

=== Pixel Visual/Neural Core ===
Starting with the first-generation Pixel devices, Pixel Camera used hardware accelerators for image processing. The first Pixel phones used Qualcomm Hexagon digital signal processors and Adreno graphics processors. The Pixel 2 and Pixel 3, except for the Pixel 3a, included the Pixel Visual Core, a programmable image-processing coprocessor designed by Google. Google stated that its eight-core image-processing unit could run HDR+ five times faster while using less than one-tenth of the energy required by the application processor. A 2018 software update exposed HDR+ processing through the Android Camera API to third-party applications. The Pixel 4 replaced the Visual Core with the Pixel Neural Core, which also accelerated other on-device machine-learning tasks.

=== HDR+ ===
Unlike earlier versions of high dynamic range (HDR) imaging, HDR+, also known as HDR+ on, uses computational photography techniques to achieve higher dynamic range. HDR+ takes continuous burst shots with short exposures. When the shutter is pressed the last 5–15 frames are analysed to pick the sharpest shots (using lucky imaging), which are selectively aligned and combined with image averaging. HDR+ also uses Semantic Segmentation to detect faces to brighten using synthetic fill flash, and darken and denoise skies. HDR+ also reduces shot noise and improves colors, while avoiding blowing out highlights and motion blur. HDR+ was introduced on the Google Nexus 6 and brought back to the Nexus 5.

==== HDR+ enhanced ====
Unlike HDR+/HDR+ On, 'HDR+ enhanced' mode does not use Zero Shutter Lag (ZSL). Like Night Sight, HDR+ enhanced features positive-shutter-lag (PSL): it captures images after the shutter is pressed. HDR+ enhanced is similar to HDR+ from the Nexus 5, Nexus 6, Nexus 5X and Nexus 6P. It is believed to use underexposed and overexposed frames like Smart HDR from Apple. HDR+ enhanced captures increase the dynamic range compared to HDR+ on. HDR+ enhanced on the Pixel 3 uses the learning-based AWB algorithm from Night Sight.

==== Live HDR+ ====
Starting with the Pixel 4, Live HDR+ replaced HDR+ on, featuring WYSIWYG viewfinder with a real-time preview of HDR+. HDR+ live uses the learning-based AWB algorithm from Night Sight and averages up to nine underexposed pictures.

==== Dual Exposure Controls ====
'Live HDR+' mode uses Dual Exposure Controls, with separate sliders for brightness (capture exposure) and for shadows (tone mapping). This feature was made available for Pixel 4, and has not been retrofitted on older Pixel devices due to hardware limitations.

==== With Bracketing ====
In April 2021, Google Camera v8.2 introduced HDR+ with Bracketing, Night Sight with Bracketing and Portrait Mode with Bracketing. Google updated their exposure bracketing algorithm for HDR+ to include an additional long exposure frame and Night Sight to include 3 long exposure frames. The spatial merge algorithm was also redesigned to decide merged or not per pixel (like Super Res Zoom) & updated to handle long exposures (clipped highlights, more motion blur and different noise characteristics). with Bracketing enables further reduced read noise, improved details/texture and more natural colors. With Bracketing is automatically enabled depending on the dynamic range and motion. With Bracketing is supported in all modes for the Pixel 4a (5G) and 5. With Bracketing is supported in Night Sight for the Pixel 4 and 4a.

=== Motion Photos ===
Google Camera's Motion photo mode is similar to HTC's Zoe and iOS' Live Photo. When enabled, a short, silent, video clip of relatively low resolution is paired with the original photo. If RAW is enabled, only a 0.8MP DNG file is created, not the non-motion 12.2MP DNG. Motion Photos was introduced on the Pixel 2. Motion Photo is disabled in HDR+ enhanced mode.

=== Video Stabilization ===
Fused Video Stabilization, a technique that combines optical image stabilization and Electronic/Digital image stabilization, can be enabled for significantly smoother video. This technique also corrects Rolling shutter distortion and Focus breathing, amongst various other problems. Fused Video Stabilization was introduced on the Pixel 2.

=== Super Res Zoom ===
Super Res Zoom is a multi-frame super-resolution technique introduced with the Pixel 3 that shifts the image sensor to achieve higher resolution, which Google claim is equivalent to 2-3× optical zoom. It is similar to drizzle image processing. Super Res Zoom can also be used with telephoto lens, for example Google claims the Pixel 4 can capture 8× zoom at near-optical quality.

=== Top Shot ===
When Motion Photos is enabled, Top Shot analyzes up to 90 additional frames from 1.5 seconds before and after the shutter is pressed. The Pixel Visual Core is used to accelerate the analysis using computer vision techniques, and ranks them based on object motion, motion blur, auto exposure, auto focus, and auto white balance. About ten additional photos are saved, including an additional HDR+ photo up to 3 MP. Top Shot was introduced on the Pixel 3.

=== Other features ===
- Computational Raw – Pixel Camera supports capturing JPEG and DNG files simultaneously. The DNG files are also processed with Google's HDR+ Computational Photography. Computational Raw was introduced on the Pixel 3.
- Motion Auto Focus – maintains focus on any subject/object in the frame. Motion Auto Focus was introduced in the Pixel 3.
- Frequent Faces – allows the camera to remember faces. The camera will try to ensure those faces are in focus, smiling and not blinking.
- Location – Location information obtained via GPS and/or Google's location service can be added to pictures and videos when enabled.
- Add Me – Introduced with the Pixel 9 series, Add Me combines two photographs taken in the same scene so that the person who took the first image can appear in the finished group photograph.

== Functions ==
Like most camera applications, Pixel Camera offers different usage modes allowing the user to take different types of photo or video.

=== Slow Motion ===
Slow motion video can be captured in Pixel Camera at either 120 or, on supported devices, 240 frames per second.

=== Panorama ===
Panoramic photography is also possible with Pixel Camera. Four types of panoramic photo are supported; Horizontal, Vertical, Wide-angle and Fisheye. Once the Panorama function is selected, one of these four modes can be selected at a time from a row of icons at the top of the screen.

=== Photo Sphere ===
Pixel Camera allows the user to create a 'Photo Sphere', a 360-degree panorama photo, originally added in Android 4.2 in 2012. These photos can then be embedded in a web page with custom HTML code or uploaded to various Google services.

The Pixel 8 released without the feature, the first Pixel phone not to have the feature, and thus leading many to believe that the feature has been discontinued.

=== Portrait ===
Portrait mode (called Lens Blur previous to the release of the Pixel line) offers an easy way for users to take 'selfies' or portraits with a Bokeh effect, in which the subject of the photo is in focus and the background is slightly blurred. This effect is achieved via the parallax information from dual-pixel sensors when available (such as the Pixel 2 and Pixel 3), and the application of machine learning to identify what should be kept in focus and what should be blurred out. Portrait mode was introduced on the Pixel 2.

Additionally, a "face retouching" feature can be activated which cleans up blemishes and other imperfections from the subject's skin.

The Pixel 4 featured an improved Portrait mode, the machine learning algorithm uses parallax information from the telephoto and the Dual Pixels, and the difference between the telephoto camera and wide camera to create more accurate depth maps. For the front facing camera, it uses the parallax information from the front facing camera and IR cameras. The blur effect is applied at the Raw stage before the tone-mapping stage for more realistic SLR-like bokeh effect.

=== Playground ===
In late 2017, with the debut of the Pixel 2 and Pixel 2 XL, Google introduced AR Stickers, a feature that, using Google's new ARCore platform, allowed the user to superimpose augmented reality animated objects on their photos and videos. With the release of the Pixel 3, AR Stickers was rebranded to Playground.

=== Google Lens ===
The camera offers a functionality powered by Google Lens, which allows the camera to copy text it sees, identify products, books and movies and search similar ones, identify animals and plants, and scan barcodes and QR codes, among other things.

=== Photobooth ===
The Photobooth mode allows the user to automate the capture of selfies. The AI is able to detect the user smile or funny faces and shoot the picture at the best time without any action from the user, similar to Google Clips. This mode also feature a two level AI processing of the subject's face that can be enabled or disabled in order to soften its skin. Motion Photos functionality is also available in this mode. The white balance is also adjustable to defined presets. In October 2019, Photobooth was removed as a standalone mode, becoming an "Auto" option in the shutter options, later being removed altogether.

=== Night Sight ===
Night Sight is based on a similar principle to exposure stacking, used in astrophotography. Night Sight uses modified HDR+ or Super Res Zoom algorithms. Once the user presses the trigger, multiple long exposure shots are taken, up to 15× 1/15 second exposure or 6× of 1 second exposure, to create up to a 6-second exposure. The motion metering and tile-based processing of the image allows to reduce, if not cancel, camera shake, resulting in a clear and properly exposed shot. Google claims it can handle up to ~8% displacement frame to frame. And each frame is broken into around 12,000 tiles. It also introduced a learning-based AWB algorithm for more accurate white balance in low light.

Night Sight also works well in daylight, improving WB, detail and sharpness. Like HDR+ enhanced, Night Sight features positive-shutter-lag (PSL). Night Sight also supports a delay-timer as well as an assisted selector for the focus featuring three options (far, close and auto-focus). Night Sight was introduced with the Pixel 3, all older Pixel phones were updated with support.

==== Astrophotography ====
Astrophotography mode activates automatically when Night Sight mode is enabled and the phone detects it is on a stable support such as a tripod. In this mode, the camera averages up to fifteen 16-second exposures, to create a 4-minute exposure to significantly reduce shot noise. By dividing the shot into several shorter exposures, the camera manages to achieve the light capture of a long exposure without having to deal with star trails, which would otherwise require moving the phone very precisely during the exposure to compensate for the Earth's rotation. Astrophotography mode also includes improved algorithms to remove hot pixels and warm pixels caused by dark current and convolutional neural network to detect skies for sky-specific noise reduction. Astrophotography mode was introduced with the Pixel 4, and backported to the Pixel 3 and Pixel 3a.

=== Portrait Light ===
Portrait Light is a post process feature that allows adding light source to portraits. It simulates the directionality and intensity to complement the original photograph's lighting using machine learning models. Portrait Light was introduced with the Pixel 5, and backported to the Pixel 4, Pixel 4a and Pixel 4a 5G. When using the default mode or Night Sight mode, its automatically applied if there a person or people. Portrait Light was a collaboration between Google Research, Google Daydream, Google Pixel, and Google Photos teams.

=== Ultra HDR ===
With the launch of the Pixel 8, Google announced that the Pixel Camera would receive support for Ultra HDR. Ultra HDR is a format that stores an additional set of data alongside the JPG, with additional luminosity information to produce an HDR photo. Shortly after, with version 9.2 of the app, Ultra HDR was backported to the Pixel 7 and 6.

== Unofficial ports to other phones ==
Many developers have released unofficial gcam ports for phones not made by Google, or implement its premium features on older Google phones. These unofficial apps often work around the lack on other phones of some of the hardware features of Google's more advanced devices, and sometimes enable features not exposed by the official version of the app. There are many different versions, targeted at different Android phones.

Although many Pixel features are available on the ported versions, some features may not to be available, or not work properly, on phones without proper API support or incompatible hardware. Google Play Services or a replacement such as microG is also required for the app to run.

In 2016 a modified version brought HDR+ with Zero Shutter Lag (ZSL) to the Google Nexus 5X and Nexus 6P. In mid-2017, a modified version of Google Camera was developed for any smartphone equipped with a Qualcomm Snapdragon 820, 821 or 835 processor. In 2018, developers released modified versions enabling Night Sight on non-Pixel phones. In August 2020, a new way of accessing extra cameras was introduced, removing the need to use root on phones that do not expose all cameras for third-party apps.
