= Comparison of Google Pixel smartphones =

The following is a comparative list of smartphones belonging to the Google Pixel line of devices, all using the Android operating system.

Legend:	Unsupported	Extended Support	Supported	Upcoming

Model		Pixel	Pixel XL	Pixel 2	Pixel 2 XL	Pixel 3	Pixel 3 XL	Pixel 3a	Pixel 3a XL	Pixel 4	Pixel 4 XL	Pixel 4a	Pixel 4a (5G)	Pixel 5	Pixel 5a
Status		Unsupported													
Manufacturer		HTC			LG	Foxconn									
Codename		Sailfish	Marlin	Walleye	Taimen	Blueline	Crosshatch	Sargo	Bonito	Flame	Coral	Sunfish	Bramble	Redfin	Barbet
Key dates	Released	October 2016		October 2017		October 2018		May 2019		October 2019		August 2020	November 2020	October 2020	August 2021
Key dates	Discontinued	April 11, 2018		April 1, 2019		March 31, 2020		July 1, 2020		August 6, 2020		January 31, 2022	August 20, 2021		July 21, 2022
Image															
Android version	Initial	7.1 Nougat		8 Oreo		9 Pie				10			11		
Android version	Latest	10		11		12		12.1		13			14		
Google Photos Storage benefits		Forever original quality		Original Quality before 2021/1/16, free Storage Saver afterwards		Original Quality before 2022/1/31, free Storage Saver afterwards		Free Storage Saver							—N/a
Cellular frequencies		GSM 850/900/1800/1900 MHz; LTE (US) bands: 1/2/3/4/5/7/8/12/13/17/20 /25/26/28/29/30/41; Carrier Aggregation: Yes, up to 3×DL		GSM 850/900/1800/1900 MHz; LTE (US) bands: 1/2/3/4/5/7/8/12/13/17/20 /25/26/28/29/30/32/ 38/40/41/66; Carrier Aggregation: Yes, up to 3×DL and 4×4 MIMO		GSM 850/900/1800/1900 MHz; LTE (US) bands: 1/2/3/4/5/7/8/12/13/17/18 /19/20/25/26/28/29/ 32/38/39/40/41/42/46/ 66/71; Carrier Aggregation: Yes, up to 5×DL and 4×4 MIMO		GSM 850/900/1800/1900 MHz; LTE (US) bands: 1/2/3/4/5/7/8/12/13/17/20 /25/26/28/32/38/40/ 41/66/71; Carrier Aggregation: Yes, up to 3×DL and 2×2 MIMO		GSM 850/900/1800/1900 MHz; LTE (US) bands: 1/2/3/4/5/7/8/12/13/14/17 /18/19/20/25/26/28/ 29/30/38/39/ 40/41/46/48/66/71; Carrier Aggregation: Yes, up to 5×DL and 4×4 MIMO		GSM 850/900/1800/1900 MHz; LTE (US) bands: 1/2/3/4/5/7/8/12/13/14/17 /18/19/20/25/26/28/ 29/30/38/39/ 40/41/46/48/66/71; Carrier Aggregation: Yes, up to 3×DL and 2×2 MIMO	GSM 850/900/1800/1900 MHz; LTE (US) bands: 1/2/3/4/5/7/8/12/13/14/17 /18/19/20/25/26/28/ 29/30/32/38/ 39/40/41/42/46/48/ 66/71; Carrier Aggregation: Yes, up to 3×DL and 2×2 MIMO; 5G bands: 1/2/3/5/7/8/12/28/ 41/66/71/77/78 (258/260/261 on Verizon Pixel 4a (5G UW) and Pixel 5)		GSM 850/900/1800/1900 MHz; LTE (US) bands: 1/2/3/4/5/7/8/12/13/14/17 /18/19/20/25/26/28/ 29/30/32/38/ 39/40/41/42/46/48/ 66/71; Carrier Aggregation: Yes, up to 3×DL and 2×2 MIMO; 5G bands: 1/2/5/12/25/28/ 41/66/71/77/78
Data speeds		HSDPA / HSPA+ / DC-HSPA+													
Dimensions	Size (H×W×D)	143.8×69.5×8.5 mm 5.66×2.74×0.33 in	154.7×75.7×8.5 mm 6.09×2.98×0.33 in	145.7×69.7×7.8 mm 5.74×2.74×0.31 in	157.9×76.7×7.9 mm 6.22×3.02×0.31 in	145.6×68.2×7.9 mm 5.73×2.69×0.31 in	158.0×76.7×7.9 mm 6.22×3.02×0.31 in	151.3×70.1×8.2 mm 5.96×2.76×0.32 in	160.1×76.1×8.2 mm 6.30×3.00×0.32 in	147.1×68.8×8.2 mm 5.79×2.71×0.32 in	160.4×75.1×8.2 mm 6.31×2.96×0.32 in	144×69.4×8.2 mm 5.67×2.73×0.32 in	153.9×74×8.2 mm 6.06×2.91×0.32 in	144.7×70.4×8 mm 5.70×2.77×0.31 in	154.9×73.7×7.6 mm 6.10×2.90×0.30 in
Dimensions	Weight	143 g (5.0 oz)	168 g (5.9 oz)	143 g (5.0 oz)	175 g (6.2 oz)	148 g (5.2 oz)	184 g (6.5 oz)	147 g (5.2 oz)	167 g (5.9 oz)	162 g (5.7 oz)	193 g (6.8 oz)	143 g (5.0 oz)	168 g (5.9 oz)	151 g (5.3 oz)	183 g (6.5 oz)
Silicon	Chipset	Qualcomm Snapdragon 821		Qualcomm Snapdragon 835		Qualcomm Snapdragon 845		Qualcomm Snapdragon 670		Qualcomm Snapdragon 855		Qualcomm Snapdragon 730G	Qualcomm Snapdragon 765G		
Silicon	Processor	Quad core 64-bit ARMv8-A: 2× 2.15 GHz Kryo Performance; 2× 1.6 GHz Kryo Efficiency		Octa core 64-bit ARMv8-A: 4× 2.35 GHz Kryo 280 Performance; 4× 1.9 GHz Kryo 280 Efficiency		Octa core 64-bit ARMv8-A: 4× 2.5 GHz Kryo 385 Gold; 4× 1.6 GHz Kryo 385 Silver		Octa core 64-bit ARMv8-A: 4× 2.0 GHz Kryo 360 Gold; 4× 1.7 GHz Kryo 360 Silver		Octa core 64-bit ARMv8-A: 1× 2.84 GHz Kryo 485 Gold Prime; 3× 2.42 GHz Kryo 485 Gold; 4× 1.78 GHz Kryo 485 Silver		Octa core 64 bit ARMv8-A: 2× 2.2 GHz Kryo 470 Gold; 6× 1.8 GHz Kryo 470 Silver	Octa core 64 bit ARMv8-A: 1× 2.4 GHz Kryo 475 Prime; 1× 2.2 GHz Kryo 475 Gold; 6× 1.8 GHz Kryo 475 Silver		
Silicon	Graphics	Adreno 530		Adreno 540		Adreno 630		Adreno 615		Adreno 640		Adreno 618	Adreno 620		
Silicon	Memory	4 GB LPDDR4		4 GB LPDDR4X						6 GB LPDDR4X				8 GB LPDDR4X	6 GB LPDDR4X
Silicon	Storage	32 or 128 GB		64 or 128 GB				64 GB		64 or 128 GB		128 GB			
Local networking		A-GPS/GLONASS; Bluetooth 4.2; Wi-Fi IEEE 802.11a/b/g/n/ac NFC		A-GPS/GLONASS; Bluetooth 5.0; Wi-Fi IEEE 802.11a/b/g/n/ac NFC								A-GPS, GLONASS, Galileo, QZSS; Bluetooth 5.0; Wi-Fi IEEE 802.11a/b/g/n/ac NFC			
Battery capacity (mAh)		2,770	3,450	2,700	3,520	2,915	3,430	3,000	3,700	2,800	3,700	3,140	3,885	4,080	4,680
Materials		Aluminum and Gorilla Glass 4		Aluminum and Gorilla Glass 5				Plastic and Asahi Dragontrail Glass		Aluminum and Gorilla Glass 5		Plastic and Gorilla Glass 3		Aluminum and Gorilla Glass 6	Aluminum and Gorilla Glass 3
Water resistance		IP53		IP67		IP68		—N/a		IP68		—N/a		IP68	IP67
Ports		USB-C; 3.5 mm TRRS		USB-C 3.1 Gen 1				USB-C; 3.5 mm TRRS		USB-C 3.1 Gen 1		USB-C 3.1 Gen 1; 3.5 mm TRRS		USB-C 3.1 Gen 1	USB-C 3.1 Gen 1; 3.5 mm TRRS
Display		5.0 in (130 mm) AMOLED; 1080×1920 px (441 ppi); 9:16 aspect ratio	5.5 in (140 mm) AMOLED; 1440×2560 px (534 ppi); 9:16 aspect ratio	5.0 in (130 mm) AMOLED; 1080×1920 px (441 ppi); 9:16 aspect ratio	6.0 in (150 mm) P-OLED; 1440×2880 px (538 ppi); 1:2 aspect ratio	5.5 in (140 mm) OLED; 1080×2160 px (443 ppi); 1:2 aspect ratio	6.3 in (160 mm) OLED; 1440×2960 px (523 ppi); 18:37 aspect ratio	5.6 in (140 mm) OLED; 1080×2220 px (441 ppi); 18:37 aspect ratio	6.0 in (150 mm) OLED; 1080×2160 px (402 ppi); 1:2 aspect ratio	5.7 in (140 mm) 90 Hz OLED; 1080×2280 px (444 ppi); 9:19 aspect ratio	6.3 in (160 mm) 90 Hz OLED; 1440×3040 px (537 ppi); 9:19 aspect ratio	5.8 in (150 mm) OLED; 1080×2340 px (443 ppi); 9:19.5 aspect ratio	6.2 in (160 mm) OLED; 1080×2340 px (413 ppi); 9:19.5 aspect ratio	6.0 in (150 mm) 90 Hz OLED; 1080×2340 px (432 ppi); 9:19.5 aspect ratio	6.34 in (161 mm) OLED; 1080×2400 px (415 ppi); 9:20 aspect ratio
Rear camera	Sensor	Sony IMX378 Exmor RS, 1/2.3"; 12.3 MP (4048×3036), 4:3 aspect ratio		Sony IMX362 Exmor RS, 1/2.55"; 12.2 MP (4032×3024), 4:3 aspect ratio		Sony IMX363 Exmor RS, 1/2.55"; 12.2 MP (4032×3024), 4:3 aspect ratio				Wide: Sony IMX363 Exmor RS, 1/2.55"; 12.2 MP (4032×3024), 4:3 aspect ratio		Sony IMX363 Exmor RS, 1/2.55"; 12.2 MP (4032×3024), 4:3 aspect ratio	Wide: Sony IMX363 Exmor RS, 1/2.55"; 12.2 MP (4032×3024), 4:3 aspect ratio		
Rear camera	Sensor	Sony IMX378 Exmor RS, 1/2.3"; 12.3 MP (4048×3036), 4:3 aspect ratio		Sony IMX362 Exmor RS, 1/2.55"; 12.2 MP (4032×3024), 4:3 aspect ratio		Sony IMX363 Exmor RS, 1/2.55"; 12.2 MP (4032×3024), 4:3 aspect ratio				—N/a		Sony IMX363 Exmor RS, 1/2.55"; 12.2 MP (4032×3024), 4:3 aspect ratio	Ultrawide: Sony IMX481 Exmor RS, 1/3"; 16 MP (4656×3496), 4:3 aspect ratio		
Rear camera	Sensor	Sony IMX378 Exmor RS, 1/2.3"; 12.3 MP (4048×3036), 4:3 aspect ratio		Sony IMX362 Exmor RS, 1/2.55"; 12.2 MP (4032×3024), 4:3 aspect ratio		Sony IMX363 Exmor RS, 1/2.55"; 12.2 MP (4032×3024), 4:3 aspect ratio				Telephoto: Sony IMX481 Exmor RS, 1/3"; 16 MP (4656×3496), 4:3 aspect ratio		Sony IMX363 Exmor RS, 1/2.55"; 12.2 MP (4032×3024), 4:3 aspect ratio	—N/a		
Rear camera	Lens	f=4.67mm (80° diag. AOV) f/2.0		f=4.44mm (77° diag. AOV) f/1.8						Wide: f=4.38mm (78° diag. AOV) f/1.7		f=4.38mm (78° diag. AOV) f/1.7	f=4.38mm (78° diag. AOV) f/1.7		
Rear camera	Lens	f=4.67mm (80° diag. AOV) f/2.0		f=4.44mm (77° diag. AOV) f/1.8						—N/a		f=4.38mm (78° diag. AOV) f/1.7	Ultrawide: f=2.22mm (107° diag. AOV) f/2.2		
Rear camera	Lens	f=4.67mm (80° diag. AOV) f/2.0		f=4.44mm (77° diag. AOV) f/1.8						Telephoto: f=5.84mm (52° diag. AOV) f/2.4		f=4.38mm (78° diag. AOV) f/1.7	—N/a		
Rear camera	Video	Up to 4K@30, 1080p@120 or 720p@240											Up to 4K@60 or 1080p@240		
Rear camera	Features	PDAF & CDAF with laser assist EIS		Dual pixel PDAF; EIS OIS						Dual pixel PDAF; EIS OIS, 2x optical zoom		Dual pixel PDAF; EIS OIS			
Front camera	Sensor	Sony IMX179 Exmor R, 1/3.2"; 8 MP (3264×2448), 4:3 aspect ratio				2× Sony IMX355 Exmor, 1/4"; 8 MP (3264×2448), 4:3 aspect ratio		1/4"? 8 MP (3264×2448), 4:3 aspect ratio		Sony IMX520 Exmor RS, 1/3.6"; 8 MP (3264×2448), 4:3 aspect ratio		Sony IMX355 Exmor, 1/4"; 8 MP (3264×2448), 4:3 aspect ratio			
Front camera	Lens	f=3.38mm (80° diag. AOV) f/2.4				f=3.0mm (75° diag. AOV) f/1.8, autofocus enabled.		f=2.54mm (84° diag. AOV) f/2.0		f=2.49mm (90° diag. AOV) f/2.0		f=2.51mm (85° diag. AOV) f/2.0			
Front camera	Lens	f=3.38mm (80° diag. AOV) f/2.4				f=2.0mm (92° diag. AOV) f/2.2		f=2.54mm (84° diag. AOV) f/2.0		f=2.49mm (90° diag. AOV) f/2.0		f=2.51mm (85° diag. AOV) f/2.0			
Front camera	Video	Up to 1080p30													
Wireless charging		No				Yes		No		Yes		No		Yes	No
Reverse wireless charging		No												Yes	No
SIM card format		Nano-SIM		Nano-SIM and Google Fi eSIM eSIM only supports Fi		Nano-SIM and eSIM can only use either at a time		Nano-SIM and eSIM, DSDS							
Colors		Very Silver; Quite Black; Really Blue (ltd)		Just Black; Clearly White; Kinda Blue	Just Black; Black & White	Just Black; Clearly White; Not Pink		Just Black; Clearly White; Purple-ish		Just Black; Clearly White; Oh So Orange		Just Black; Barely Blue (ltd, added 2020-11-16)	Just Black; Clearly White	Just Black; Sorta Sage	Mostly Black
References															

Model			Pixel 6	Pixel 6 Pro	Pixel 6a	Pixel 7	Pixel 7 Pro	Pixel 7a	Pixel Fold	Pixel 8	Pixel 8 Pro	Pixel 8a	Pixel 9	Pixel 9 Pro	Pixel 9 Pro XL	Pixel 9 Pro Fold	Pixel 9a
Status			Supported														
Manufacturer			Foxconn										Dixon	Foxconn			Dixon
Codename			Oriole	Raven	Bluejay	Panther	Cheetah	Lynx	Felix	Shiba	Husky	Akita	Tokay	Caiman	Komodo	Comet	Tegu
Key dates		Released	October 2021		July 2022	October 2022		May 2023	June 2023	October 2023		May 2024	August 2024	September 2024	August 2024	September 2024	April 2025
Key dates		Discontinued	October 13, 2022		May 10, 2023	August 13, 2024						March 31, 2026	—N/a			July 20, 2026	—N/a
Image																	
Android version		Initial	12			13				14							15
Android version		Latest	17														
Cellular frequencies			GSM 850/900/1800/1900 MHz; LTE (US) bands: 1/2/3/4/5/7/8/12/13/14/17 /18/19/20/25/26/28/29/30/32/38/ 39/40/41/42/46/48/66/71; Carrier Aggregation: Yes, up to 3×DL and 2×2 MIMO; 5G bands: 1/2/3/5/7/8/12/14/20/25/28/30/38/40/41/48/66/71/77/78 (257/258/260/261 on Verizon)						?				GSM 850/900/1800/1900 MHz; LTE (US) bands: B1/2/3/4/5/7/8/12/13/14/17/18/19/20/21/25/26/28/29/30/32/38/39/40/41/42/48/66/71/75; 5G bands: n1/2/3/5/7/8/12/14/20/25/26/28/30/38/40/41/66/71/75/76/77/78/79 (257/258/260/261 on Verizon)				
Data speeds			HSDPA / HSPA+ / DC-HSPA+														
Dimensions		Size (H×W×D)	158.6×74.8×8.9 mm 6.24×2.94×0.35 in	163.9×75.9×8.9 mm 6.45×2.99×0.35 in	152.2×71.8×8.9 mm 5.99×2.83×0.35 in	155.6×73.2×8.7 mm 6.13×2.88×0.34 in	162.9×76.6×8.9 mm 6.41×3.02×0.35 in	152×72.9×9 mm 5.98×2.87×0.35 in	Folded: 139.7×79.5×12.1 mm 5.50×3.13×0.48 in Unfolded: 139.7×158.7×5.8 mm 5.50×6.25×0.23 in	150.5×70.8×8.9 mm 5.93×2.79×0.35 in	162.6×76.5×8.8 mm 6.40×3.01×0.35 in	152.1×72.7×8.9 mm 5.99×2.86×0.35 in	152.8×72×8.5 mm 6.02×2.83×0.33 in		162.8×76.6×8.5 mm 6.41×3.02×0.33 in	Folded: 155.2×77.1×10.5 mm 6.11×3.04×0.41 in Unfolded: 155.2×150.2×5.1 mm 6.11×5.91×0.20 in	154.7×73.3×8.9 mm 6.09×2.89×0.35 in
Dimensions		Weight	207 g (7.3 oz)	210 g (7.4 oz)	178 g (6.3 oz)	197 g (6.9 oz)	212 g (7.5 oz)	194 g (6.8 oz)	283 g (10.0 oz)	187 g (6.6 oz)	213 g (7.5 oz)	188 g (6.6 oz)	198 g (7.0 oz)	199 g (7.0 oz)	221 g (7.8 oz)	257 g (9.1 oz)	186 g (6.6 oz)
Silicon		Chipset	Google Tensor			Google Tensor G2				Google Tensor G3			Google Tensor G4				
Silicon		Processor	Octa core 64 bit ARMv8-A: 2× 2.8 GHz Cortex-X1; 2× 2.25 GHz Cortex-A76; 4× 1.8 GHz Cortex-A55			Octa core 64 bit ARMv8-A: 2× 2.85 GHz Cortex-X1; 2× 2.35 GHz GHz Cortex-A78; 4× 1.8 GHz Cortex-A55				Nona core 64 bit ARMv9-A: 1× 3.0 GHz Cortex-X3; 4× 2.45 GHz Cortex-A715; 4× 2.15 GHz Cortex-A510			Octa core 64 bit ARMv9.2-A: 1× 3.1 GHz Cortex-X4; 3× 2.6 GHz Cortex-A720; 4×1.92 GHz Cortex-A520				
Silicon		Graphics	Mali-G78 MP20			Mali-G710 MP7				Mali-G715s							
Silicon		Memory	8 GB LPDDR5	12 GB LPDDR5	6 GB LPDDR5	8 GB LPDDR5	12 GB LPDDR5	8 GB LPDDR5	12 GB LPDDR5	8 GB LPDDR5X	12 GB LPDDR5X	8 GB	12 GB	16 GB			8 GB
Silicon		Storage	128 or 256 GB	128, 256 or 512 GB	128 GB	128 or 256 GB	128, 256 or 512 GB	128 GB	256 or 512 GB	128 or 256 GB	128, 256 or 512 GB; 1 TB	128 or 256 GB		128, 256 or 512 GB; 1 TB		256 or 512 GB	128 or 256 GB
Local networking			A-GPS, GLONASS, Galileo, QZSS, BDS; Bluetooth 5.2; Wi-Fi IEEE 802.11a/b/g/n/ac/6e NFC					A-GPS, GLONASS, Galileo, QZSS, BDS; Bluetooth 5.3; Wi-Fi IEEE 802.11a/b/g/n/ac/6e NFC	A-GPS, GLONASS, Galileo, QZSS; Bluetooth 5.2; Wi-Fi IEEE 802.11a/b/g/n/ac/6e NFC	A-GPS, GLONASS, Galileo, QZSS, BDS; Bluetooth 5.3; Wi-Fi IEEE 802.11a/b/g/n/ac/6e/be NFC							A-GPS, GLONASS, Galileo, QZSS, BDS; Bluetooth 5.3; Wi-Fi IEEE 802.11a/b/g/n/ac/6e NFC
Battery capacity (mAh)			4,614	5,003	4,410	4,355	5,000	4,385	4,821	4,575	5,050	4492	4700	4700	5060	4650	5100
Materials			Aluminum and Gorilla Glass Victus		Aluminum, Plastic and Gorilla Glass 3	Aluminum and Gorilla Glass Victus		Aluminum, Plastic and Gorilla Glass 3	Aluminum and Gorilla Glass Victus	Aluminum and Gorilla Glass Victus 2		Aluminum, Plastic and Gorilla Glass 3	Aluminum and Gorilla Glass Victus 2				Aluminum, Plastic and Gorilla Glass 3
Water resistance			IP68		IP67	IP68		IP67	IPX8	IP68		IP67	IP68			IPX8	IP68
Ports			USB-C 3.1 Gen 1			USB-C 3.2 Gen 2											
Display		Cover	6.4 in (160 mm) 90 Hz OLED; 1080×2400 px (411 ppi); 9:20 aspect ratio	6.7 in (170 mm) 120 Hz LTPO OLED; 1400×3120 px (512 ppi); 9:19.5 aspect ratio	6.1 in (150 mm) OLED; 1080×2400 px (429 ppi); 9:20 aspect ratio	6.3 in (160 mm) 90 Hz OLED; 1080×2400 px (416 ppi); 9:20 aspect ratio	6.7 in (170 mm) 120 Hz LTPO OLED; 1440×3120 px (512 ppi); 9:19.5 aspect ratio	6.1 in (150 mm) 90 Hz OLED; 1080×2400 px (429 ppi); 9:20 aspect ratio	5.8 in (150 mm) 120 Hz OLED; 1080×2092 px (408 ppi); 9:17.4 aspect ratio	6.2 in (160 mm) 120 Hz OLED; 1080×2400 px (428 ppi); 9:20 aspect ratio	6.7 in (170 mm) 120 Hz LTPO OLED; 1344×2992 px (489 ppi); 9:20 aspect ratio	6.1 in (150 mm) 120 Hz OLED; 1080×2400 px (429 ppi); 9:20 aspect ratio	6.3 in (160 mm) 120 Hz OLED; 1080×2424 px (422 ppi); 9:20 aspect ratio	6.3 in (160 mm) 120 Hz LTPO OLED; 1280×2856 px (495 ppi); 9:20 aspect ratio	6.8 in (170 mm) 120 Hz LTPO OLED; 1344×2992 px (486 ppi); 9:20 aspect ratio	6.3 in (160 mm) 120 Hz OLED; 1080×2424 px (422 ppi); 9:20 aspect ratio	
Display		Inner	—N/a						7.6 in (190 mm) 120 Hz OLED; 2208×1840 px (378 ppi); 6:5 aspect ratio	—N/a						8.0 in (200 mm) 120 Hz LTPO OLED; 2076×2152 px (373 ppi)	—N/a
Rear camera	Sensor	Wide	Samsung ISOCELL GN1, 1/1.31", 50 MP (8160×6144), 4:3 aspect ratio		Sony IMX363 Exmor RS, 1/2.55"; 12.2 MP (4032×3024), 4:3 aspect ratio	Samsung ISOCELL GN1, 1/1.31", 50 MP (8160×6144), 4:3 aspect ratio		Sony IMX787 Exmor RS, 1/1.73"; 64 MP (9248×6944), 4:3 aspect ratio	Sony IMX787 Exmor RS, 1/2"; 48 MP (8000×6000), 4:3 aspect ratio	Samsung ISOCELL GNK, 1/1.31", 50 MP (8160×6144), 4:3 aspect ratio		Sony IMX787 Exmor RS, 1/1.73"; 64 MP (9248×6944), 4:3 aspect ratio	Samsung ISOCELL GNK, 1/1.31", 50 MP (8160×6144), 4:3 aspect ratio			Samsung ISOCELL GN8, 1/2"; 48 MP (8000×6000), 4:3 aspect ratio	
Rear camera	Sensor	Ultra wide	Sony IMX386 Exmor RS, 1/2.9"; 12 MP (4032×3016), 4:3 aspect ratio			Sony IMX381 Exmor RS, 1/2.9"; 12 MP (4032×3016), 4:3 aspect ratio		Sony IMX712 Exmor RS, 1/3.1"; 13 MP (4160×3120), 4:3 aspect ratio	Samsung ISOCELL 3J1, 1/3"; 10.8 MP (3976×2736), 4.36:3 aspect ratio	Sony IMX381? Exmor RS, 1/2.9"; 12 MP (4032×3016), 4:3 aspect ratio	Sony IMX787 Exmor RS, 1/2"; 48 MP (8000×6000?), 4:3 aspect ratio	Sony IMX712 Exmor RS, 1/3.1"; 13 MP (4160×3120), 4:3 aspect ratio	Sony IMX858 Exmor RS, 1/2.55"; 48 MP (8064×6048), 4:3 aspect ratio			Samsung ISOCELL 3LU, 1/3.4"; 10.5 MP, 4:3 aspect ratio	Sony IMX712 Exmor RS, 1/3.1"; 13 MP (4160×3120), 4:3 aspect ratio
Rear camera	Sensor	Telephoto	—N/a	Sony IMX586 Exmor RS, 1/2"; 48 MP (8000×6000), 4:3 aspect ratio	—N/a		Samsung ISOCELL GM5, 1/2.55"; 48 MP (8064×6048), 4:3 aspect ratio	—N/a	Samsung ISOCELL 3J1, 1/3"; 10.8 MP (3976×2736), 4.36:3 aspect ratio	—N/a	Samsung ISOCELL GM5, 1/2.55"; 48 MP (8064×6048), 4:3 aspect ratio	—N/a		Sony IMX858 Exmor RS, 1/2.55"; 48 MP (8064×6048), 4:3 aspect ratio		Samsung ISOCELL 3J1, 1/3.2"; 10.8 MP (3976×2736), 4.36:3 aspect ratio	—N/a
Rear camera	Lens	Wide	f=6.81mm (82° diag. AOV) f/1.85		f=4.38mm (77° diag. AOV) f/1.7	f=6.81mm (82° diag. AOV) f/1.85		f=5.43mm (80° diag. AOV) f/1.9	f=4.53mm (82° diag. AOV) f/1.7	f=6.9mm (82° diag. AOV) f/1.68		f=5.43mm (80° diag. AOV) f/1.9	f=6.9mm (82° diag. AOV) f/1.68			f=4.53mm (82° diag. AOV) f/1.7	
Rear camera	Lens	Ultra wide	f=2.35mm (114° diag. AOV) f/2.2				f=1.95mm (125.8° diag. AOV) f/2.2	f=1.84mm (120° AOV) f/2.2	f=2.22mm (121° AOV) f/2.2	f=1.95mm (125.8° AOV) f/2.2	f=2.23mm (125.5° AOV) f/1.95	f=1.84mm (120° AOV) f/2.2	f=2.02mm (123° AOV) f/1.7			f=1.54mm (127° AOV) f/2.2	f=1.84mm (120° AOV) f/2.2
Rear camera	Lens	Telephoto	—N/a	f=19.0mm (23.5° diag. AOV) f/3.5	—N/a		f=19.0mm (20.5° diag. AOV) f/3.5	—N/a	f=14.2mm (22° diag. AOV) f/3.1	—N/a	f=18.0mm (21.8° diag. AOV) f/2.8	—N/a		f=18.0mm (22° diag. AOV) f/2.8		f=14.2mm (23° diag. AOV) f/3.1	—N/a
Rear camera	Video		Up to 4K@60 or 1080p@240														
Rear camera	Features		Dual pixel PDAF Laser AF; EIS OIS	Dual pixel PDAF Laser AF; EIS OIS, 4x optical zoom	Dual pixel PDAF; EIS OIS	Dual pixel PDAF Laser AF; EIS OIS	Dual pixel PDAF Laser AF; EIS OIS, 5x optical zoom	Omnidirectional PDAF; EIS OIS	Dual pixel PDAF Laser AF; EIS OIS, 5x optical zoom	Dual pixel PDAF Laser AF; EIS OIS	Dual pixel PDAF Laser AF; EIS OIS, 5x optical zoom	Dual pixel PDAF; EIS OIS	Dual pixel PDAF Laser AF; EIS OIS	Dual pixel PDAF Laser AF; EIS OIS, 5x optical zoom			Dual pixel PDAF; EIS OIS
Front camera	Sensor	Outer / Cover	Sony IMX355 Exmor, 1/4"; 8 MP (3264×2448), 4:3 aspect ratio	11.1 MP, 4:3 aspect ratio	Sony IMX355 Exmor, 1/4"; 8 MP (3264×2448), 4:3 aspect ratio	Samsung ISOCELL 3J1, 1/3.1", 10.8 MP (3976×2736), 4.36:3 aspect ratio		Sony IMX712 Exmor RS, 1/3.1"; 13 MP (4160×3120), 4:3 aspect ratio	Samsung ISOCELL 3J1, 9.5 MP, 4:3 aspect ratio	Samsung ISOCELL 3J1, 1/3.1"; 10.5 MP (3648×2736), 4:3 aspect ratio		Sony IMX712 Exmor RS, 1/3.1"; 13 MP (4160×3120), 4:3 aspect ratio	Samsung ISOCELL 3J1, 1/3.1"; 10.5 MP (3648×2736), 4:3 aspect ratio	42 MP, 4:3 aspect ratio		Samsung ISOCELL 3K1, 1/3.94"; 10 MP, 4:3 aspect ratio	Sony IMX712 Exmor RS, 1/3.1"; 13 MP (4160×3120), 4:3 aspect ratio
Front camera	Sensor	Inner	—N/a						Sony IMX355 Exmor, 1/4"; 8 MP (3264×2448), 4:3 aspect ratio	—N/a						Samsung ISOCELL 3K1, 1/3.94"; 10 MP, 4:3 aspect ratio	—N/a
Front camera	Lens	Outer / Cover	f=2.51mm (85° diag. AOV) f/2.0	f=2.74mm (94° diag. AOV) f/2.2	f=2.5mm (84° diag. AOV) f/2.0	f=2.74mm (92.8° AOV) f/2.2		f=2.74mm (84° AOV) f/2.2	f=?mm (84° AOV) f/2.2	f=2.74mm (95° AOV) f/2.2		f=2.74mm (96.5° AOV) f/2.2	f=2.74mm (95° AOV) f/2.2	f=2.71mm (103° AOV) f/2.2		f=2.38mm (87° AOV) f/2.2	f=2.74mm (96.1° AOV) f/2.2
Front camera	Lens	Inner	—N/a						f=2.5mm (84° AOV) f/2.0	—N/a						f=2.38mm (87° AOV) f/2.2	—N/a
Front camera	Video		Up to 1080p30	Up to 4K30 or 1080p60	Up to 1080p30	Up to 4K60 or 1080p60		Up to 4K30 or 1080p30	Up to 4K60 or 1080p60			Up to 4K30 or 1080p30	Up to 4K60 or 1080p60				Up to 4K30 or 1080p30
Wireless charging			Yes		No	Yes											
Reverse wireless charging			Yes		No	Yes		No		Yes		No	Yes			No	
SIM card format			Nano-SIM and eSIM, DSDS														
Colors			Stormy Black; Sorta Seafoam; Kinda Coral	Stormy Black; Cloudy White; Sorta Sunny	Charcoal; Chalk; Sage	Lemongrass; Snow; Obsidian	Hazel; Snow; Obsidian	Coral; Sea; Charcoal; Snow	Porcelain; Obsidian	Hazel; Mint; Obsidian; Rose	Bay; Mint; Obsidian; Porcelain	Aloe; Bay; Porcelain; Obsidian	Peony; Wintergreen; Porcelain; Obsidian	Porcelain; Rose Quartz; Hazel; Obsidian		Porcelain; Obsidian	Obsidian; Porcelain; Iris; Peony
References																	

Model			Pixel 10	Pixel 10 Pro	Pixel 10 Pro XL	Pixel 10 Pro Fold	Pixel 10a	Pixel 11	Pixel 11 Pro	Pixel 11 Pro XL	Pixel 11 Pro Fold
Status			Supported								
Manufacturer			Dixon	Foxconn			Dixon		Foxconn		
Codename			Frankel	Blazer	Mustang	Rango	Stallion	Cubs	Grizzly	Kodiak	Yogi
Key dates		Released	August 2025			October 2025	March 2026	August 2026			
Key dates		Discontinued	—N/a								
Image											
Android version		Initial	16					17			
Android version		Latest	17								
Data speeds			HSDPA / HSPA+ / DC-HSPA+								
Dimensions		Size (H×W×D)	152.8×72×8.6 mm 6.02×2.83×0.34 in		162.8×76.6×8.5 mm 6.41×3.02×0.33 in	Folded: 155.2×76.3×10.8 mm 6.11×3.00×0.43 in Unfolded: 155.2×150.4×5.2 mm 6.11×5.92×0.20 in	153.9×73×9 mm 6.06×2.87×0.35 in	152.8×72×8.6 mm 6.02×2.83×0.34 in	152.7×71.9×8.4 mm 6.01×2.83×0.33 in	162.7×76.5×8.5 mm 6.41×3.01×0.33 in	Folded: 155.2×76×10.1 mm 6.11×2.99×0.40 in Unfolded: 155.2×150.4×5 mm 6.11×5.92×0.20 in
Dimensions		Weight	204 g (7.2 oz)	207 g (7.3 oz)	232 g (8.2 oz)	258 g (9.1 oz)	183 g (6.5 oz)	197 g (6.9 oz)	204 g (7.2 oz)	226 g (8.0 oz)	239 g (8.4 oz)
Silicon		Chipset	Google Tensor G5				Google Tensor G4	Google Tensor G6			
Silicon		Processor	Octa core 64 bit ARMv9.2-A: 1× 3.78 GHz Cortex-X4; 5× 3.05 GHz Cortex-A725; 2× 2.25 GHz Cortex-A520				Octa core 64 bit ARMv9.2-A: 1× 3.1 GHz Cortex-X4; 3× 2.6 GHz Cortex-A720; 4× 1.92 GHz Cortex-A520	7 core 64 bit ARMv9.3-A: 1× 4.1 GHz C1-Ultra; 4× 3.4 GHz C1-Pro; 2× 2.65 GHz C1-Pro			
Silicon		Graphics	PowerVR DXT-48-1536				Mali-G715s	PowerVR CXTP-48-1536			
Silicon		Memory	12 GB	16 GB			8 GB	12 GB	12 or 16 GB		16 GB
Silicon		Storage	128 or 256 GB	128, 256 or 512 GB; 1 TB	256 or 512 GB; 1 TB		128 or 256 GB	256 or 512 GB	256 or 512 GB; 1 TB		
Local networking			A-GPS, GLONASS, Galileo, QZSS, BDS; Bluetooth 6.0; Wi-Fi IEEE 802.11a/b/g/n/ac/6e NFC	A-GPS, GLONASS, Galileo, QZSS, BDS; Bluetooth 6.0; Wi-Fi IEEE 802.11a/b/g/n/ac/6e/be NFC			A-GPS, GLONASS, Galileo, QZSS, BDS; Bluetooth 6.0; Wi-Fi IEEE 802.11a/b/g/n/ac/6e NFC		A-GPS, GLONASS, Galileo, QZSS, BDS; Bluetooth 6.0; Wi-Fi IEEE 802.11a/b/g/n/ac/6e/be NFC		
Battery capacity (mAh)			4970	4870	5200	5015	5100	4985	4850	5115	4806
Materials			Aluminum and Gorilla Glass Victus 2				Aluminum, Plastic and Gorilla Glass 7i	Aluminum and Gorilla Glass Victus 2			
Water resistance			IP68			IPX8	IP68				
Ports			USB-C 3.2 Gen 2								
Display		Cover	6.3 in (160 mm) 120 Hz OLED; 1080×2424 px (422 ppi); 9:20 aspect ratio	6.3 in (160 mm) 120 Hz LTPO OLED; 1280×2856 px (495 ppi); 9:20 aspect ratio	6.8 in (170 mm) 120 Hz LTPO OLED; 1344×2992 px (486 ppi); 9:20 aspect ratio	6.4 in (160 mm) 120 Hz OLED; 1080×2364 px (408 ppi); 9:20 aspect ratio	6.3 in (160 mm) 120 Hz OLED; 1080×2424 px (422 ppi); 9:20 aspect ratio		6.3 in (160 mm) 120 Hz LTPO OLED; 1280×2856 px (495 ppi); 9:20 aspect ratio	6.8 in (170 mm) 120 Hz LTPO OLED; 1344×2992 px (486 ppi); 9:20 aspect ratio	6.5 in (170 mm) 120 Hz OLED; 1080×2342 px (399 ppi); 9:19.5 aspect ratio
Display		Inner	—N/a			8.0 in (200 mm) 120 Hz OLED; 2076×2152 px (373 ppi)	—N/a				8.0 in (200 mm) 120 Hz OLED; 2076×2152 px (373 ppi)
Rear camera	Sensor	Wide	Samsung ISOCELL GN8, 1/2"; 48 MP (8000×6000), 4:3 aspect ratio	Samsung ISOCELL GNK, 1/1.31", 50 MP (8160×6144), 4:3 aspect ratio		Samsung ISOCELL GN8, 1/2"; 48 MP (8000×6000), 4:3 aspect ratio		Unknown sensor, 1/1.56"; 48 MP (8064×6048?), 4:3 aspect ratio	Samsung ISOCELL GNK, 1/1.31", 50 MP (8160×6144), 4:3 aspect ratio		Unknown sensor, 1/1.56"; 48 MP (8064×6048?), 4:3 aspect ratio
Rear camera	Sensor	Ultra wide	Sony IMX712 Exmor RS, 1/3.1"; 13 MP (4160×3120), 4:3 aspect ratio	Sony IMX858 Exmor RS, 1/2.51"; 48 MP (8064×6048), 4:3 aspect ratio		Samsung ISOCELL 3LU, 1/3.4"; 10.5 MP, 4:3 aspect ratio	Sony IMX712 Exmor RS, 1/3.1"; 13 MP (4160×3120), 4:3 aspect ratio		Sony IMX858 Exmor RS, 1/2.51"; 48 MP (8064×6048), 4:3 aspect ratio		Samsung ISOCELL 3LU, 1/3.4"; 10.5 MP, 4:3 aspect ratio
Rear camera	Sensor	Telephoto	Samsung ISOCELL 3J1, 1/3.2"; 10.8 MP (3976×2736), 4.36:3 aspect ratio	Samsung IMX858 Exmor RS, 1/2.51"; 48 MP (8064×6048), 4:3 aspect ratio		Samsung ISOCELL 3J1, 1/3.2"; 10.8 MP (3976×2736), 4.36:3 aspect ratio	—N/a	Samsung ISOCELL 3J1, 1/3.2"; 10.8 MP (3976×2736), 4.36:3 aspect ratio	Unknown sensor, 1/1.95"; 48 MP (8064×6048?), 4:3 aspect ratio		Samsung ISOCELL 3J1, 1/3.2"; 10.8 MP (3976×2736), 4.36:3 aspect ratio
Rear camera	Lens	Wide	f=4.53mm (82° diag. AOV) f/1.7	f=6.9mm (82° diag. AOV) f/1.68		f=4.53mm (82° diag. AOV) f/1.7		f=5.28mm (85° diag. AOV) f/1.7	f=6.9mm (82° diag. AOV) f/1.68		f=5.28mm (85° diag. AOV) f/1.7
Rear camera	Lens	Ultra wide	f=1.85mm (120° AOV) f/2.2	f=2.02mm (123° AOV) f/1.7		f=1.54mm (127° AOV) f/2.2	f=1.85mm (120° AOV) f/2.2		f=2.02mm (123° AOV) f/1.7		f=1.54mm (127° AOV) f/2.2
Rear camera	Lens	Telephoto	f=14.2mm (23° diag. AOV) f/3.1	f=17.9mm (22° diag. AOV) f/2.8		f=14.2mm (23° diag. AOV) f/3.1	—N/a	f=14.2mm (23° diag. AOV) f/3.1	f=19.52mm (23° diag. AOV) f/2.8		f=14.2mm (23° diag. AOV) f/3.1
Rear camera	Video		Up to 4K@60 or 1080p@240								
Rear camera	Features		Dual pixel PDAF Laser AF; EIS OIS, 5x optical zoom				Dual pixel PDAF; EIS OIS	Dual pixel PDAF Laser AF; EIS OIS, 5x optical zoom			
Front camera	Sensor	Outer / Cover	Samsung ISOCELL 3J1, 1/3.1"; 10.5 MP (3648×2736), 4:3 aspect ratio	42 MP, 4:3 aspect ratio		Samsung ISOCELL 3K1, 1/3.94"; 10 MP, 4:3 aspect ratio	Sony IMX712 Exmor RS, 1/3.1"; 13 MP (4160×3120), 4:3 aspect ratio	Samsung ISOCELL 3J1, 1/3.1"; 10.5 MP (3648×2736), 4:3 aspect ratio	42 MP, 4:3 aspect ratio		Samsung ISOCELL 3K1, 1/3.94"; 10 MP, 4:3 aspect ratio
Front camera	Sensor	Inner	—N/a			Samsung ISOCELL 3K1, 1/3.94"; 10 MP, 4:3 aspect ratio	—N/a				Samsung ISOCELL 3K1, 1/3.94"; 10 MP, 4:3 aspect ratio
Front camera	Lens	Outer / Cover	f=2.74mm (95° AOV) f/2.2	f=2.71mm (103° AOV) f/2.2		f=2.38mm (87° AOV) f/2.2	f=2.74mm (96.1° AOV) f/2.2	f=2.74mm (95° AOV) f/2.2	f=2.71mm (103° AOV) f/2.2		f=2.38mm (87° AOV) f/2.2
Front camera	Lens	Inner	—N/a			f=2.38mm (87° AOV) f/2.2	—N/a				f=2.38mm (87° AOV) f/2.2
Front camera	Video		Up to 4K60 or 1080p60				Up to 4K30 or 1080p30	Up to 4K60 or 1080p60			
Wireless charging			Yes, Pixelsnap				Yes	Yes, Pixelsnap			
Reverse wireless charging			Yes			No		Yes			No
SIM card format			Nano-SIM and eSIM (Dual eSIM for U.S. models), DSDS			Nano-SIM and eSIM, DSDS		Nano-SIM and eSIM (Dual eSIM for U.S. models), DSDS			Nano-SIM and eSIM, DSDS
Colors			Indigo; Frost; Lemongrass; Obsidian	Moonstone; Jade; Porcelain; Obsidian		Moonstone; Jade	Lavender; Berry; Fog; Obsidian	Frost; Hibiscus; Pistachio; Obsidian	Canyon; Olive; Fog; Obsidian (matte)		Olive; Obsidian
References											

== See also ==
- Comparison of Google Nexus smartphones
- List of Google Play edition devices
