= Pixel 11 =

2026 Android smartphone developed by Google

- Diagram of the Pixel 11, in "Hibiscus"
- Developer: Google
- Type: Smartphone
- Series: Pixel
- First released: August 20, 2026; 2 months ago
- Predecessor: Pixel 10
- Related: Pixel 11 Pro & Pixel 11 Pro XL; Pixel 11 Pro Fold
- Compatible networks: GSM / EDGE; UMTS / HSPA+ / HSDPA; LTE; 5G sub-6 / mmWave
- Form factor: Slate
- Colors: Hibiscus; Frost; Pistachio; Obsidian
- Dimensions: H: 6.0 in (152.8 mm); W: 2.8 in (72 mm); D: 0.3 in (8.6 mm)
- Weight: 6.9 oz (197 g)
- Operating system: Android 17
- System-on-chip: Google Tensor G6
- CPU: 1x 4.11 GHz Cortex C1-Ultra + 4x 3.38 GHz Cortex C1-Pro + 2x 2.65 GHz Cortex C1-Pro
- GPU: PowerVR CXTP-48-1536
- Modem: MediaTek
- Memory: 12 GB LPDDR5X
- Storage: 256 GB UFS 4.0; 512 GB Zoned UFS 4.0
- SIM: Dual eSIM (US); Nano-SIM and eSIM (elsewhere)
- Battery: 4985 mAh
- Charging: 30 W? fast charging 25 W Qi2.2 wireless charging
- Rear camera: 48 MP, f/1.7, 85˚ field of view (wide), 1/1.56"; 13 MP, f/2.2, 120˚ field of view (ultrawide), 1/3.1"; 10.8 MP, f/3.1, 23° field of view (telephoto), 5x optical zoom, 1/3.2"; 4K video at 24, 30, or 60 FPS; 1080p video at 24, 30, or 60 FPS
- Front camera: 10.5 MP, f/2.2, 95˚ field of view (ultrawide) 4K video at 30, or 60 FPS 1080p video at 30, or 60 FPS
- Display: 6.3 in (161 mm) FHD+ 1080p OLED 2424 × 1080 px (20:9) aspect ratio at 422 ppi HDR, 60–120 Hz refresh rate
- Sound: Stereo speakers; 3 microphones; Noise suppression; Spatial audio
- Connectivity: Wi-Fi 6E? + MIMO; Bluetooth 6.0; NFC; Google Cast; Dual-band GNSS (GPS / GLONASS / Galileo); USB-C 3.2
- Data inputs: Accelerometer; Ambient light sensor; Barometer; Fingerprint scanner; Gyroscope; Magnetometer; Proximity sensor
- Water resistance: IP68
- Other: Gorilla Glass Victus 2 cover; Gorilla Glass Victus 2 back; Titan M3 security module
- Website: Pixel 11

The Pixel 11 is an Android-based smartphone designed, developed, manufactured, and marketed by Google as part of the Google Pixel product line. It serves as the successor to the Pixel 10, with a similar feature set and design. Along with the rest of the Pixel 11 series, it is expected to debut with Gemini Intelligence, an agentic AI framework that would be powered by Google's Gemini models, capable of performing various tasks on behalf of the user. It was announced on August 12, 2026.

== History ==
On July 7, 2026, Google sent out invites for the next Made by Google event, set for August 12 in New York City. The Pixel 11's design was officially teased in a video on July 15, 2026, showing off the Pixel 11 lineup.

On August 6, 2026, Google announced that South African comedian Trevor Noah would host the Made by Google Keynote, with featured appearances by NBA star Stephen Curry, podcaster Alex Cooper, cricketer Shubman Gill, along with several others. This was the second time that Google would announce an American comedian to host a Made by Google Keynote event since Jimmy Fallon in 2025.

The phone was officially announced on August 12, along with the rest of the lineup, consisting of the Pixel 11 Pro, Pixel 11 Pro XL, and Pixel 11 Pro Fold. It also debuted alongside the Pixel Watch 5, a new color option for the existing Pixel Buds Pro 2, and a new Pixel Tag tracker. Preorders begin on that same day, with a release date set for August 20 in the United States.

== Specifications ==
=== Design ===
The Pixel 11 retains same shape that was introduced with the Pixel 9 series, with flat sides and rounded corners, and a camera bar that is independent from the rest of the frame. Compared to the Pixel 10, the glass panel covering the lenses, microphone, and autofocus sensors on the camera bar now extends all the way to the right edge, covering over the flash and making it symmetrical.

It is available in four colors: Hibiscus, Frost, Pistachio, and Obsidian.

Color options for the Pixel 11
Hibiscus	Frost	Pistachio	Obsidian

=== Hardware ===
The phone's display resolution remains the same at FHD+ 1080p with a 120Hz refresh rate.

The rear wide-angle camera is changed to a different 48MP sensor with a larger, 1/1.56" sensor size. The 13MP ultrawide, and 10.8MP 5x telephoto sensors remain the same as the Pixel 10, as well as the front-facing camera at 10.5MP.

The sixth-generation Tensor G6 custom System-on-Chip (SoC) contains many changes under the hood. The second year Google has used TSMC to produce its custom silicon, the die size remains the same at 3nm. Unlike several reports had previously claimed, the chip was not developed on a 2nm process, as was confirmed by Google. The seven CPU cores use the new ARM Cortex C1-series, consisting of a single Cortex C1-Ultra core and six C1-Pro cores. The GPU is an Imagination PowerVR CXTP-48-1536. CXTP is a newly modified variant of the flagship CXT series from 2021; the extra "P" denotes power efficiency For the first time since the adoption of Tensor, the Samsung Exynos modems are dropped in favor of one from MediaTek, which is said to reduce power drainage issues caused by signal-hunting, where the device struggles to find or stay connected to a mobile network. These improvements suggest that Tensor G6 provides additional performance for heavy workloads, and draws less power when connected to cellular networks.

With Tensor G6 comes an updated Titan M3 security module, which brings post-quantum cryptography to the existing feature set from prior generations.

=== Software ===
The Pixel 11 Series launched with Android 17.

The Pixel 11 series includes Gemini Intelligence, consisting of a number of agentic AI tools, suggestions, and software cues throughout Android and select apps. It is powered by Google's Gemini models in the cloud and Gemma models which run on-device.

Proactive Assistance is the updated version of Magic Cue, which originally launched with the Pixel 10 Series.
