= Pixel 11 Pro =

2026 Android smartphones developed by Google

Pixel 11 Pro; Pixel 11 Pro XL
- Diagrams of the Pixel 11 Pro (L) in Canyon, and Pixel 11 Pro XL (R) in Olive
- Developer: Google
- Type: Smartphone
- Series: Pixel
- First released: August 20, 2026; 2 months ago
- Predecessor: Pixel 10 Pro; Pixel 10 Pro XL
- Related: Pixel 11; Pixel 11 Pro Fold
- Compatible networks: GSM / EDGE; UMTS / HSPA+ / HSDPA; LTE; 5G sub-6 / mmWave
- Form factor: Slate
- Colors: Canyon; Olive; Fog; Obsidian (matte)
- Dimensions: Pixel 11 Pro: H: 6.0 in (152.7 mm); W: 2.8 in (71.9 mm); D: 0.3 in (8.4 mm); Pixel 11 Pro XL: H: 6.4 in (162.7 mm); W: 3.0 in (76.5 mm); D: 0.3 in (8.5 mm)
- Weight: Pixel 11 Pro: 7.2 oz (204 g); Pixel 11 Pro XL: 8.0 oz (226 g)
- Operating system: Android 17
- System-on-chip: Google Tensor G6
- CPU: 1x 4.11 GHz Cortex C1-Ultra + 4x 3.38 GHz Cortex C1-Pro + 2x 2.65 GHz Cortex C1-Pro
- GPU: PowerVR CXTP-48-1536
- Modem: MediaTek
- Memory: 12 GB LPDDR5X (256GB versions); 16 GB LPDDR5X (512GB, 1TB versions)
- Storage: 256 GB UFS 4.0; 512 GB & 1 TB Zoned UFS 4.0
- SIM: Dual eSIM (US); Nano-SIM and eSIM (elsewhere)
- Battery: Pixel 11 Pro: 4850 mAh; Pixel 11 Pro XL: 5115 mAh
- Charging: Pixel 11 Pro: 30 W fast charging; 25 W Qi2.2 wireless charging; Pixel 11 Pro XL: 45 W fast charging; 25 W Qi2.2 wireless charging
- Rear camera: 50 MP, f/1.68, 82˚ field of view (wide), 1/1.3"; 48 MP, f/1.7, 123˚ field of view (ultrawide), 1/2.51"; 48 MP, f/2.8, 23˚ field of view (telephoto), 5× optical zoom, 1/1.95"; 1080p video at 24, 30, or 60 FPS; 4K video at 24, 30, or 60 FPS; 8K video at 24, 30 FPS
- Front camera: 42 MP, f/2.2, 103˚ field of view (ultrawide); 1080p video at 30 or 60 FPS; 4K video at 30 or 60 FPS
- Display: Pixel 11 Pro: 6.3 in (161 mm) FHD+ LTPO OLED at 495 ppi; 2856 × 1280 px (20:9); 2400 nits (HDR); 3600 nits (peak brightness); 1–120 Hz refresh rate; Pixel 11 Pro XL: 6.8 in (172 mm) QHD+ LTPO OLED at 486 ppi; 2992 × 1344 px (20:9); 2400 nits (HDR); 3600 nits (peak brightness); 1–120 Hz refresh rate
- Sound: Stereo speakers; 3 microphones; Noise suppression; Spatial audio
- Connectivity: Wi-Fi 7 + MIMO; Bluetooth 6.0; NFC; Google Cast; Dual-band GNSS (GPS / GLONASS / Galileo); Ultra-wideband (UWB) chip; Thread Radio; USB-C 3.2
- Data inputs: Accelerometer; Ambient light sensor; Barometer; Fingerprint scanner; Gyroscope; Magnetometer; Proximity sensor
- Water resistance: IP68
- Other: Gorilla Glass Victus 2 cover with anti-scratch coating; Gorilla Glass Victus 2 back; Titan M3 security module
- Website: Pixel 11 & 11 Pro XL

The Pixel 11 Pro and Pixel 11 Pro XL are a pair of flagship Android-based smartphones designed, developed, and marketed by Google as part of the Google Pixel product line. It serves as the successor to the Pixel 10 Pro and Pixel 10 Pro XL. It was announced on August 12, 2026 at the Made by Google keynote.

== History ==
One of the Pixel 11 Pro's features and design changes were leaked prior to the official launch, including the color options for the phones. In July 2026, an image of a Pixel 11 Pro was leaked on Google Fi's website. The phones were approved by the Federal Communications Commission that same month.

Reports as early as April 2026 suggested Google was working on a feature dubbed 'Pixel Glow', and that it would be used in upcoming Pixel devices. In early-August 2026, 9to5Google reported that the ‘Pixel Glow’ feature expected to debut on these devices would be called ‘HiLight’.

Four days prior to the formal introduction of the Pixel 11 Pro, a picture was posted showing the actual Pixel 11 Pro XL, along with its box, which were labeled as carrier demo units.

=== Launch ===
On July 7, 2026, Google sent out invites for the next Made by Google event, set for August 12 in New York City. The Pixel 11's design was teased twice in videos that same month, showing off the Pixel 11 lineup, and showing the Google services with the tagline "next obvious move". On August 6, 2026, Google announced that comedian Trevor Noah would host the Made by Google Keynote, with featured appearances by NBA star Stephen Curry, podcaster Alex Cooper, cricketer Shubman Gill, along with several others. This was the second time that Google would announce an American comedian to host a Made by Google Keynote event since Jimmy Fallon in 2025.

After teasing the device in early-August, and sending out discount codes for the phones, Google officially announced the Pixel 11 Pro and Pixel 11 Pro XL on August 12, along with the rest of the lineup, consisting of the Pixel 11 Pro, Pixel 11 Pro XL, and Pixel 11 Pro Fold. It debuted alongside the Pixel Watch 5, a new Olive color option for the existing Pixel Buds Pro 2, and a new Pixel Tag tracker. Preorders began on the same day, with a release date set for August 20 in the United States.

== Specifications ==
=== Design ===
The size and shape of both phones are both reflective of their predecessors, with flat sides and round corners, and share similar dimensions. The glass covering the rear lenses, microphone, and autofocus sensors on the camera bar now extends all the way to the right edge, making it symmetrical. The temperature sensor found on the Pixel 10 Pro and prior Pro models is removed, leaving the flash to occupy the same area next to the cameras at the same height behind the camera glass cover.

It is available in four colors: Canyon, Olive, Fog, and Obsidian. Obsidian is the only color variant with a matte finish on the aluminum frame, other colors have a polished finish.

Color options for the Pixel 11 Pro & Pro XL
Pixel 11 Pro				Pixel 11 Pro XL			
Canyon	Olive	Fog	Obsidian (matte)	Canyon	Olive	Fog	Obsidian (matte)

=== Hardware ===
The phone's display resolution remains the same, with a 120Hz LTPO refresh rate, and uses a new Samsung M16 OLED panel that increases brightness while reducing battery usage and improving color accuracy.

The camera configuration is updated to a new wide-angle 50MP primary camera on the rear. The 48MP telephoto camera is upgraded with a larger sensor size and optics, letting in a larger amount of light. This allows for 120x zoom with the AI-assisted 'Pro Zoom', up from 100x on the Pixel 10 Pro.

The sixth-generation Tensor G6 custom System-on-Chip (SoC) contains many changes under the hood. The second year Google has used TSMC to produce its custom silicon, the die size remains the same at 3nm. Unlike several reports had previously claimed, the chip was not developed on a 2nm process, as was confirmed by Google. The seven CPU cores use the new ARM Cortex C1-series, consisting of a single Cortex C1-Ultra core and six C1-Pro cores. The GPU is an Imagination PowerVR CXTP-48-1536. CXTP is a newly modified variant of the flagship CXT series from 2021; the extra "P" denotes power efficiency. For the first time since the adoption of Tensor, the Samsung Exynos modems are dropped in favor of one from MediaTek, which is said to reduce power drainage issues caused by signal-hunting, where the device struggles to find or stay connected to a mobile network. These improvements suggest that Tensor G6 provides additional performance for heavy workloads, and draws less power when connected to cellular networks.

With Tensor G6 comes an updated Titan M3 security module, which brings post-quantum cryptography to the existing feature set from prior generations.

=== Software ===
The Pixel 11 Series launched with Android 17.

The Pixel 11 series launched with Gemini Intelligence, consisting of a number of agentic tools, suggestions, and cues. It is powered by Google's Gemini models in the cloud and on-device Gemma models.

Proactive Assistance is the updated version of Magic Cue, which originally launched with the Pixel 10 Series.
