= Pixel 11 Pro Fold =

2026 foldable smartphone developed by Google

- Developer: Google
- Type: Smartphone
- Series: Pixel
- First released: August 20, 2026; 56 days ago
- Predecessor: Pixel 10 Pro Fold
- Related: Pixel 11; Pixel 11 Pro & 11 Pro XL
- Compatible networks: GSM / EDGE; UMTS / HSPA+ / HSDPA; LTE; 5G sub-6 / mmWave
- Form factor: Foldable
- Colors: Olive; Obsidian
- Dimensions: Folded: H: 6.1 in (155.2 mm); W: 3.0 in (76.0 mm); D: 0.4 in (10.1 mm); Unfolded: H: 6.1 in (155.2 mm); W: 5.9 in (150.4 mm); D: 0.2 in (5.0 mm)
- Weight: 239 g (8.4 oz)
- Operating system: Android 17
- System-on-chip: Google Tensor G6
- CPU: 1x 4.11 GHz Cortex C1-Ultra + 4x 3.38 GHz Cortex C1-Pro + 2x 2.65 GHz Cortex C1-Pro
- GPU: PowerVR CXTP-48-1536
- Modem: MediaTek
- Memory: 16 GB LPDDR5X
- Storage: 256 GB UFS 4.0; 512 GB & 1 TB Zoned UFS 4.0
- SIM: Nano SIM and eSIM
- Battery: 4806 mAh
- Charging: 30 W? fast charging; 25 W Qi2.2 wireless charging
- Rear camera: 48 MP, f/1.7, 85˚ field of view (wide), 1/1.56"; 10.5 MP, f/2.2, 127˚ field of view (ultrawide), 1/3.4"; 10.8 MP, f/3.1, 23° field of view (telephoto), 5x optical zoom, 1/3.2"; 4K video at 24, 30, 60 FPS; 1080p video at 24, 30, 60 FPS
- Front camera: Front & Inner: 10 MP, f/2.2, 87˚ field of view (ultrawide); 4K video at 30, 60 FPS; 1080p video at 30, 60 FPS
- Display: Cover: 6.5 in (164 mm) FHD+ 1080p LTPO OLED at 399 ppi; 2342 × 1080 px (19.5:9); 1-120 Hz refresh rate; Folding: 8.0 in (204 mm) FHD+ LTPO OLED at 372 ppi; 2152 × 2076 px (1.04:1); 1-120 Hz refresh rate; Both: HDR
- Sound: Stereo speakers; 3 microphones; Noise suppression; Spatial audio
- Connectivity: Wi-Fi 7 + MIMO; Bluetooth 6.0; NFC; Google Cast; Dual-band GNSS (GPS / GLONASS / Galileo); Ultra-wideband (UWB) chip
- Data inputs: Accelerometer; Ambient light sensor; Barometer; Fingerprint scanner; Gyroscope; Magnetometer; Proximity sensor
- Water resistance: IP68
- Other: Gorilla Glass Victus 2 cover; Ultra-thin Glass (Internal Display); Gorilla Glass Victus 2 back; Titan M3 security module

The Pixel 11 Pro Fold is a foldable Android-based smartphone designed, developed, and marketed by Google as part of its Google Pixel product line. It serves as the successor to the Pixel 10 Pro Fold, with a similar feature set and design. Along with the rest of the Pixel 11 series, it debuted with Gemini Intelligence, an agentic AI framework that would be powered by Google's Gemini models, capable of performing various tasks on behalf of the user. It was announced on August 12, 2026.

== History ==
On July 7, 2026, Google sent out invites for the Made by Google event, set for August 12 in New York City. The Pixel 11 Pro Fold's design was officially teased in a video on August 3, 2026, showing off the Pixel 11 Pro Fold lineup.

On August 6, 2026, Google announced that comedian Trevor Noah would host the Made by Google Keynote, with featured appearances by NBA star Stephen Curry, podcaster Alex Cooper, cricketer Shubman Gill, along with several others. This was the second time that Google would announce a comedian to host a Made by Google Keynote event since Jimmy Fallon in 2025.

== Specifications ==
=== Design ===
The Pixel 11 Pro Fold retains the same shape as the previous two generations of Pixel foldables, with only a slight difference in dimensions. Similar to the rest of the Pixel 11 family, the body of the device has flat sides and rounded corners, and is slightly thicker when folded at 10.1mm. When unfolded, it becomes about half the thickness at 5mm. The body also contains magnets near the hinge in the middle and the outer edge that helps snap the two sides together when folding it, and adds resistance to keep it from opening unintentionally.

As a foldable, it will feature two displays, an external cover display with a shape similar to that of a typical slate-style smartphone, and a flexible internal display that is designed to be used when the device is unfolded.

Emulating a similar design evolution of the rear camera bar as the rest of the Pixel 11 series, both pill-shaped glass panels that cover the lenses and autofocus sensors now extend all the way to the right edge, covering over the microphone and flash module also. On the top of the two stacked camera covers, the flash moves over to the left side, while the telephoto switches places and moves to the right. These glass covers also protrude out of the aluminum camera bar, rather than being flush with it.

It is available in two colors: Obsidian and Olive.

Pixel 11 Pro Fold
Olive	Obsidian

=== Hardware ===
The cover display has slightly thinner bezels than the previous generation, now measuring 6.5" diagonally. It also gains LTPO technology, enabling a 1-120 Hz refresh rate, and a slightly shorter FHD+ resolution. The internal folding display is still 8.0" with a 120Hz LTPO refresh rate. Both displays feature a peak brightness of 3600 nits.

The rear camera system features a larger 48MP wide-angle camera, the same one found in the Pixel 11, and retains the same 10.5MP ultrawide, 10.8MP 5x telephoto camera, and 10MP front-facing selfie camera for both displays. Like its slab-style counterparts, it contains an array of RGB LEDs within the flash module on the rear camera bar, used to power a new feature called HiLight.

The sixth-generation Tensor G6 custom System-on-Chip (SoC) will contain many changes under the hood. The second year Google has used TSMC to produce its custom silicon, the die size remains the same at 3nm. Unlike several reports had previously claimed, the chip was not developed on a 2nm process, as was confirmed by Google. The seven CPU cores use the new ARM Cortex C1-series, consisting of a single Cortex C1-Ultra core and six C1-Pro cores. The GPU is an Imagination PowerVR CXTP-48-1536. CXTP is a newly modified variant of the flagship CXT series from 2021; the extra "P" denotes power efficiency. For the first time since the adoption of Tensor, the Samsung Exynos modems are dropped in favor of one from MediaTek, which is said to reduce power drainage issues caused by signal-hunting, where the device struggles to find or stay connected to a mobile network. These improvements suggest that Tensor G6 provides additional performance for heavy workloads, and draws less power when connected to cellular networks.

With Tensor G6 comes an updated Titan M3 security module, which brings post-quantum cryptography to the existing feature set from prior generations.

=== Software ===
The Pixel 11 series launched with Android 17.

The Pixel 11 series launched with Gemini Intelligence, consisting of a number of Agentic tools, suggestions or cues, etc. It is powered by Google's Gemini models in the cloud and Gemma models which run on-device.

Proactive Assistance is the updated version of Magic Cue, which originally launched with the Pixel 10 Series.
