= Pixel 10 Pro =

2025 Android smartphones developed by Google

Pixel 10 Pro; Pixel 10 Pro XL
- Diagrams of the Pixel 10 Pro (L) in Jade, and Pixel 10 Pro XL (R) in Moonstone
- Developer: Google
- Type: Smartphone
- Series: Pixel
- First released: August 28, 2025; 13 months ago
- Discontinued: August 12, 2026
- Predecessor: Pixel 9 Pro; Pixel 9 Pro XL
- Successor: Pixel 11 Pro; Pixel 11 Pro XL
- Related: Pixel 10; Pixel 10 Pro Fold; Pixel 10a
- Compatible networks: GSM / EDGE; UMTS / HSPA+ / HSDPA; LTE; 5G sub-6 / mmWave
- Form factor: Slate
- Dimensions: Pixel 10 Pro: H: 6.0 in (152.8 mm); W: 2.8 in (72 mm); D: 0.3 in (8.6 mm); Pixel 10 Pro XL: H: 6.4 in (162.8 mm); W: 3.0 in (76.6 mm); D: 0.3 in (8.5 mm)
- Weight: Pixel 10 Pro: 7.3 oz (207 g); Pixel 10 Pro XL: 8.2 oz (232 g)
- Operating system: Android 16, upgradable to Android 17
- System-on-chip: Google Tensor G5
- CPU: 1x 3.78 GHz Cortex-X4 + 5x 3.05 GHz Cortex-A725 + 2x 2.25 GHz Cortex-A520
- GPU: 2x 1.1 GHz Imagination DXT-48-1536
- Modem: Samsung Exynos 5400
- Memory: 16 GB LPDDR5X
- Storage: Pixel 10 Pro: 128 GB UFS 3.1, 256 GB UFS 4.0; 512 GB & 1 TB Zoned UFS 4.0; Pixel 10 Pro XL: 256 GB UFS 4.0; 512 GB & 1 TB Zoned UFS 4.0
- SIM: Dual eSIM (US); Nano-SIM and eSIM (elsewhere)
- Battery: Pixel 10 Pro: 4870 mAh; Pixel 10 Pro XL: 5200 mAh
- Charging: Pixel 10 Pro: 30 W fast charging; 15 W Qi2 wireless charging; Pixel 10 Pro XL: 45 W fast charging; 25 W Qi2.2 wireless charging
- Rear camera: 50 MP, f/1.68, 82˚ field of view (wide), 1/1.3"; 48 MP, f/1.7, 123˚ field of view (ultrawide), 1/2.55"; 48 MP, f/2.8, 22˚ field of view (telephoto), 5× optical zoom, 1/2.55"; 1080p video at 24, 30, or 60 FPS; 4K video at 24, 30, or 60 FPS; 8K video at 30 FPS
- Front camera: 42 MP, f/2.2, 103˚ field of view (ultrawide); 4K video at 30 or 60 FPS
- Display: Pixel 10 Pro: 6.3 in (161 mm) FHD+ LTPO OLED at 495 ppi; 2856 × 1280 px (20:9); 2200 nits (HDR); 3300 nits (peak brightness); 1–120 Hz refresh rate; Pixel 10 Pro XL: 6.8 in (172 mm) QHD+ LTPO OLED at 486 ppi; 2992 × 1344 px (20:9); 2200 nits (HDR); 3300 nits (peak brightness); 1–120 Hz refresh rate
- Sound: Stereo speakers; 3 microphones; Noise suppression; Spatial audio
- Connectivity: Wi-Fi 7 + MIMO; Bluetooth 6.0; NFC; Google Cast; Dual-band GNSS (GPS / GLONASS / Galileo); USB-C 3.2
- Data inputs: Accelerometer; Ambient light sensor; Barometer; Fingerprint scanner; Gyroscope; Magnetometer; Proximity sensor; Temperature sensor
- Water resistance: IP68
- Other: Gorilla Glass Victus 2 cover; Gorilla Glass Victus 2 back; Titan M2 security module; Ultra-wideband (UWB) chip; Thread Radio
- Website: Pixel 10 & 10 Pro XL

The Pixel 10 Pro and Pixel 10 Pro XL are a pair of flagship Android-based smartphones designed, developed, and marketed by Google as part of the Google Pixel product line. It was announced on August 20, 2025 at the Made by Google keynote in Brooklyn, New York. It serves as the successor to the Pixel 9 Pro & Pixel 9 Pro XL, with a familiar design introduced with the Pixel 9 Series. It features the fifth-generation Google Tensor system-on-chip, a new Qi2-ready Pixelsnap magnetic accessory support, access to advanced artificial intelligence features powered by Google Gemini, and comes pre-installed with Android 16 and newly-added Material 3 Expressive UI theming.

== History ==
The Pixel 10 Pro & Pixel 10 Pro XL, were officially announced on August 20, 2025, alongside the Pixel 10, Pixel 10 Pro Fold smartphones at the annual Made by Google Keynote in Brooklyn, New York. Pre-orders began the same day, and it was released in the United States on August 28. The Pixel 10 Series was also joined by the Pixel Watch 4 and Pixel Buds 2a as companion accessories for the line-up. The Made By Google '25 event marks the second time Google has released their flagship Pixel products in August, before the Apple September Event for their annual iPhone release.

== Specifications ==
=== Design ===
The Pixel 10 Pro & Pixel 10 Pro XL design is slightly-modified from the Pixel 9 Pro and Pixel 9 Pro XL. Like its predecessors, they share flat sides, rounded corners, and the oval-shaped camera bar. The Pixel 10 Pro shares dimensions with the base Pixel 10, with a 6.3-inch even-bezeled display, while the Pixel 10 Pro XL has a larger 6.8-inch display. While the Pixel 10 only has a flash, the Pixel 10 Pro has both a flash and a thermometer on the camera bar.

It comes in four different colors, Obsidian, Porcelain, Jade, and Moonstone.

Color options for the Pixel 10 Pro series
Pixel 10 Pro				Pixel 10 Pro XL			
Diagram of a Pixel 10 Pro smartphone in gray.	Diagram of a Pixel 10 Pro smartphone in light green.	Diagram of a Pixel 10 Pro smartphone in white.	Diagram of a Pixel 10 Pro smartphone in black.	Diagram of a Pixel 10 Pro XL smartphone in gray.	Diagram of a Pixel 10 Pro XL smartphone in light green.	Diagram of a Pixel 10 Pro XL smartphone in white.	Diagram of a Pixel 10 Pro XL smartphone in black.
Moonstone	Jade	Porcelain	Obsidian	Moonstone	Jade	Porcelain	Obsidian

=== Hardware ===
The displays remain largely unchanged for both models, with the same screen sizes, resolutions, and 120 Hz LTPO refresh rate. However, the PWM dimming rate increases from 240 Hz to 480 Hz, which significantly reduces eye strain and headaches for users with eye fatigue, by minimizing the perceived flicker of the display that becomes more apparent at lower brightness levels.

The camera system on the Pixel 10 Pro & Pro XL models also remains unchanged. It keeps the same 50 MP wide, 48 MP ultrawide, and 48 MP 5× telephoto rear cameras on the back, and the same 42MP selfie camera on the front, that are found in the Pixel 9 Pro & Pro XL. The 5× telephoto gains the ability to take tele-macro photos, compared to macro mode for the ultrawide camera only. The Pixel 10 Series also gains advanced stabilization, that Android Headlines has described as "using a Pixel 10 on a DJI Osmo Mobile 6, but without that gimbal."

The custom Google Tensor G5 System-on-Chip (SoC) that powers the entire Pixel 10 line-up is a noticeable upgrade over the Tensor G4 and other previous Tensor processors. Instead of using Samsung Exynos fabrication, Google switched to TSMC as their manufacturer for Tensor G5, and used their state of the art N3E 3 nm processing node that many other smartphone chips use, such as the Apple A18 Pro and Snapdragon 8 Elite. Compared to Exynos, it provides better efficiency, performance improvements, and runs at lower temperatures. Tensor overheating often plagued older Pixel models, and was revealed to be the number one reason older handsets were returned. Although it uses an octa-core configuration similar to Tensor G4, it slightly outperforms it in terms of single-core and multicore benchmarks, and in terms of battery efficiency. It uses the same Samsung Exynos 5400 modem as the Tensor G4, allowing for satellite connectivity for contacting emergency services in dead zones.

Alongside the base Pixel 10, the Pro models also gain "Pixelsnap", a Google-branded feature that adds a circular magnet array to the back of the phone to align cases, wallets, phone mounts, stands, and wireless charging pucks and stands, and other accessories using the magnetic field. It is based on Qi2, the wireless charging standard which introduced the MagSafe magnetic array found in iPhones since the iPhone 12. It supports the latest Qi2 Standard, which allows for wireless charging speeds up to 15 W with Qi2 chargers for the smaller Pixel 10 Pro. The Pixel 10 Pro XL exclusively supports Qi2.2, which can charge up to 25 W with compatible chargers, such as the new Google Pixelsnap Charger released for the Pixel 10 Series. They are the first Android smartphones primarily available in western markets to contain magnets built directly into the back of the phone, similar to iPhones, and one of a few to include it internationally.

=== Software ===
The Pixel 10 Series comes pre-installed with Android 16, with the recently-announced Material 3 Expressive UI theming also onboard at launch. It is based on the same Material You theming introduced with the Pixel 6 series and Android 12. It changes font & icon styles, makes text, time, buttons, and icons expand and scale dynamically. Furthermore, it makes animations more fluid and makes haptics more frequent throughout interfaces, and overhauls the notification bar and Quick Settings panel to allow for more customization. The Pixel 10 Series will receive seven years of major Android updates.

The Pixel 10 Series brings multiple new AI-powered features. Magic Cue is an agentic suggestion integration that leverages on-device machine learning to provide relevant information to the user during a text conversation or phone call. It scans information in emails, messages, notes, and surfaces relevant suggestions to autofill in a text message or display during a phone call. It is only integrated with Google services as the moment, such as Gmail, Keep Notes, Google Messages, Google Calendar, etc.

Camera Coach is an Gemini-powered virtual guide that assists the user in taking photos in the Camera app by providing step-by-step instructions for proper framing, lighting, composition and more. It does not run on-device, and therefore reliant on an internet connection to function.

Exclusive to the Pro models is 100x Pro Res Zoom, which leverages the upgraded TPU in the Tensor G5 chip to artificially upscale images up to 100x with a 1 billion-parameter diffusion model that runs entirely on-device.
