= Pixel 10 Pro Fold =

2025 foldable smartphone developed by Google

- Diagram of the Pixel 10 Pro Fold (Moonstone), opened to show the internal screen
- Developer: Google
- Type: Smartphone
- Series: Pixel
- First released: October 9, 2025; 10 months ago
- Discontinued: August 12, 2026
- Predecessor: Pixel 9 Pro Fold
- Successor: Pixel 11 Pro Fold
- Related: Pixel 10; Pixel 10 Pro & 10 Pro XL; Pixel 10a
- Compatible networks: GSM / EDGE; UMTS / HSPA+ / HSDPA; LTE; 5G sub-6 / mmWave
- Form factor: Foldable
- Dimensions: Folded: H: 6.1 in (155.2 mm); W: 3.0 in (76.3 mm); D: 0.4 in (10.8 mm); Unfolded: H: 6.1 in (155.2 mm); W: 5.9 in (150.4 mm); D: 0.2 in (5.2 mm)
- Weight: 9.1 oz (258 g)
- Operating system: Android 16, upgradable to Android 17
- System-on-chip: Google Tensor G5
- CPU: 1x 3.78 GHz Cortex-X4 + 5x 3.05 GHz Cortex-A725 + 2x 2.25 GHz Cortex-A520
- GPU: 2x 1.1 GHz Imagination DXT-48-1536
- Modem: Samsung Exynos 5400
- Memory: 16 GB LPDDR5X
- Storage: 256 GB UFS 4.0; 512 GB & 1 TB Zoned UFS 4.0
- SIM: Nano SIM and eSIM
- Battery: 5015 mAh
- Charging: 30 W fast charging; 15 W Qi2 wireless charging
- Rear camera: 48 MP, f/1.7, 82˚ field of view (wide), 1/2"; 10.5 MP, f/2.2, 127˚ field of view (ultrawide), 1/3.4"; 10.8 MP, f/3.1, 23° field of view (telephoto), 5x optical zoom, 1/3.4"; 4K video at 24, 30, 60 FPS; 1080p video at 24, 30, 60 FPS
- Front camera: Front & Inner: 10 MP, f/2.2, 87˚ field of view (ultrawide); 4K video at 24, 30, 60 FPS; 1080p video at 24, 30, 60 FPS
- Display: Folded: 6.4 in (162 mm) FHD+ 1080p OLED at 408 ppi; 2364 × 1080 px (20:9); 60-120 Hz refresh rate; Unfolded: 8.0 in (204 mm) FHD+ LTPO OLED at 373 ppi; 2152 × 2076 px (1.04:1); 1-120 Hz refresh rate; Both: HDR
- Sound: Stereo speakers; 3 microphones; Noise suppression; Spatial audio
- Connectivity: Wi-Fi 7 + MIMO; Bluetooth 6.0; NFC; Google Cast; Dual-band GNSS (GPS / GLONASS / Galileo); USB-C 3.2
- Data inputs: Accelerometer; Ambient light sensor; Barometer; Fingerprint scanner; Gyroscope; Magnetometer; Proximity sensor
- Water resistance: IP68
- Other: Gorilla Glass Victus 2 cover; Ultra-thin Glass (Internal Display); Gorilla Glass Victus 2 back; Titan M2 security module; Thread Radio
- Website: Pixel 10 Pro Fold

The Pixel 10 Pro Fold is a foldable Android-based smartphone designed, developed, and marketed by Google as part of its Google Pixel product line. It was announced on August 20, 2025 at the Made by Google keynote in Brooklyn, New York. It serves as the successor to the Pixel 9 Pro Fold, which it shares a nearly-identical design with. It features the fifth-generation Google Tensor system-on-chip, Qi2 compatibility, and Gemini-powered artificial intelligence features. Furthermore, it comes pre-installed with Android 16 and newly-added Material 3 Expressive UI theming.

== History ==
The Pixel 10 Pro Fold was officially announced on August 20, 2025, with the Pixel 10, Pixel 10 Pro, and Pixel 10 Pro XL at the annual Made by Google keynote in Brooklyn, New York. The launch event was hosted by late-night comedian Jimmy Fallon, and featured appearances by NBA star Stephen Curry, Formula One driver Lando Norris, and the musical group Jonas Brothers, where they also premiered the music video of "I Can't Lose" which was also filmed on the Pixel 10 Pro.

Pre-orders began the same day, although it took until October 9 for it to release in the United States. The foldable was also accompanied by the Pixel Watch 4 and Pixel Buds 2a as companion accessories for the line-up, which released alongside it on the same day. The Made By Google '25 event marks the second time Google has released their flagship Pixel products in August, before the Apple September Event for their annual iPhone release.

== Specifications ==
=== Design ===
Compared to its predecessor, the Pixel 10 Pro Fold's design is nearly identical. Like the rest of the Pixel 10 series, it has flat sides and rounded corners, but is much thinner to allow the phone to fold in half with nearly the same thickness as the slab-style models. As a foldable smartphone, it contains a flexible internal display that is nearly twice the size of the outer display, which can be folded in half to make the phone more pocketable. The cover display has slightly thinner bezels, increasing the screen size from 6.3" to 6.4". It is slightly thicker than the Pixel 9 Pro Fold due to a larger battery.

The Pixel 9 Pro Fold, and first Pixel Fold used only “Obsidian” and “Porcelain” colorways, but the Pixel 10 Pro Fold has 2 different colors that match Pixel 10 Pro & Pro XL: Moonstone and Jade.

Pixel 10 Pro Fold
| Back | Cover display | Inner folding display | Back | Cover display | Inner folding display |
| Moonstone | | | Jade | | |

=== Hardware ===
Both OLED displays of the Pixel 10 Pro Fold have similar specifications to the Pixel 9 Pro Fold. The 8" internal Super Actua Flex Display and external 6.4" Actua Display have a peak brightness of 3000 nits, and a 120Hz refresh rate, although the internal display uses an LTPO display.

The camera configuration remains unchanged from the previous generation, using the same 48MP Wide, 10.5MP Ultrawide, and 10.8MP 5x Telephoto cameras on the rear, and the same identical 10MP selfie cameras on the cover display and internal folding display.

It is the first foldable to support IP68 water & dust resistance, which was achieved by reengineering the phone's hinge to be gearless.

Following the rest of the Pixel 10 series, the Pixel 10 Pro Fold obtains the Tensor G5 custom System-on-Chip (SoC), which is a noticeable upgrade over the Tensor G4 and other previous Tensor processors. Instead of using Samsung Exynos fabrication, Google switched their chip manufacturer to TSMC, and used their state of the art N3E 3 nm processing node that many other smartphone chips use, such as the Apple A18 Pro and Snapdragon 8 Elite. Compared to Exynos, it provides better efficiency, performance improvements, and runs at lower temperatures, which often plagued older Pixel models. Although it uses a similar 8-core configuration as the Tensor G4, it slightly outperforms it in single-core and multicore benchmarks, and significantly outlasts it in terms of battery efficiency. It uses the same Samsung Exynos 5400 modem as the Tensor G4, allowing for Satellite Connectivity for contacting emergency services in dead zones.

Despite the foldable being nearly half the thickness of the Pixel 10 & 10 Pro when unfolded, it fully supports the new Google-branded "Pixelsnap" technology, adding a circular magnet array to the back of the phone to align cases, wallets, phone mounts, stands, and wireless charging pucks and stands, and other accessories using the magnetic field. It is based on the wireless charging standard Qi2. It supports up to 15W wireless charging speed, same as some of its slab phone counterparts. Although it is not the first foldable smartphone to support the Qi2 specification, with the Samsung Galaxy Z Fold 7 being the first to be Qi2-Ready, it is the very first to have magnets built into the back of the phone, similar to iPhones.

=== Software ===
The Pixel 10 Series comes pre-installed with Android 16, with the recently-announced Material 3 Expressive UI theming also onboard at launch. It is based on the same Material You theming introduced with the Pixel 6 series and Android 12. It changes font & icon styles, makes text, time, buttons, and icons expand and scale dynamically. Furthermore, it makes animations more fluid and makes haptics more frequent throughout interfaces, and overhauls the notification bar and Quick Settings panel to allow for more customization.

Exclusive to the Pixel 10 Series are multiple AI-powered features. Magic Cue is an agentic suggestion integration that leverages on-device machine learning to provide relevant information to the user during a text conversation or phone call. It scans information in emails, messages, notes, and surfaces relevant suggestions to autofill in a text message or display during a phone call. It is only integrated with Google services at the moment, such as Gmail, Keep Notes, Google Messages, Google Calendar, etc.

Camera Coach is a Gemini-powered virtual guide that assists the user in taking photos in the Camera app by providing step-by-step instructions for proper framing, lighting, composition and more. It does not run on-device, and therefore is reliant on an internet connection to function.

Also within the Camera app is a new “Instant View” mode. When the display is unfolded, you can preview a camera roll of recently-taken photos on the left-half of the screen, while the right-half displays the live viewfinder. This mode is exclusive to the Pixel 10 Pro Fold only.
