= Pixel 10 =

2025 Android smartphone developed by Google

- Diagram of the Pixel 10, in "Indigo"
- Developer: Google
- Type: Smartphone
- Series: Pixel
- First released: August 28, 2025; 13 months ago
- Discontinued: August 12, 2026
- Predecessor: Pixel 9
- Successor: Pixel 11
- Related: Pixel 10 Pro & 10 Pro XL; Pixel 10 Pro Fold; Pixel 10a
- Compatible networks: GSM / EDGE; UMTS / HSPA+ / HSDPA; LTE; 5G sub-6 / mmWave
- Form factor: Slate
- Colors: Indigo; Frost; Lemongrass; Obsidian
- Dimensions: H: 6.0 in (152.8 mm); W: 2.8 in (72 mm); D: 0.3 in (8.6 mm)
- Weight: 7.2 oz (204 g)
- Operating system: Android 16, upgradable to Android 17
- System-on-chip: Google Tensor G5
- CPU: 1x 3.78 GHz Cortex-X4 + 5x 3.05 GHz Cortex-A725 + 2x 2.25 GHz Cortex-A520
- GPU: 2x 1.1 GHz PowerVR DXT-48-1536
- Modem: Samsung Exynos 5400
- Memory: 12 GB LPDDR5X
- Storage: 128 GB UFS 3.1, 256 GB UFS 4.0
- SIM: Dual eSIM (US); Nano-SIM and eSIM (elsewhere)
- Battery: 4970 mAh
- Charging: 29 W fast charging 15 W Qi2 wireless charging
- Rear camera: 48 MP, f/1.7, 82˚ field of view (wide), 1/2"; 13 MP, f/2.2, 120˚ field of view (ultrawide), 1/3.1"; 10.8 MP, f/3.1, 23° field of view (telephoto), 5x optical zoom, 1/3.2"; 4K video at 24, 30, or 60 FPS; 1080p video at 24, 30, or 60 FPS
- Front camera: 10.5 MP, f/2.2, 95˚ field of view (ultrawide) 4K video at 24, 30, or 60 FPS 1080p video at 24, 30, or 60 FPS
- Display: 6.3 in (161 mm) FHD+ 1080p OLED 2424 × 1080 px (20:9) aspect ratio at 422 ppi HDR, 60–120 Hz refresh rate
- Sound: Stereo speakers; 3 microphones; Noise suppression; Spatial audio
- Connectivity: Wi-Fi 6E + MIMO; Bluetooth 6.0; NFC; Google Cast; Dual-band GNSS (GPS / GLONASS / Galileo); USB-C 3.2
- Data inputs: Accelerometer; Ambient light sensor; Barometer; Fingerprint scanner; Gyroscope; Magnetometer; Proximity sensor
- Water resistance: IP68
- Other: Gorilla Glass Victus 2 cover; Gorilla Glass Victus 2 back; Titan M2 security module
- Website: Pixel 10

The Pixel 10 is an Android smartphone designed, developed, and marketed by Google as part of the Google Pixel product line. It was announced on August 20, 2025 at the Made by Google keynote in Brooklyn, New York. It is the successor to the Pixel 9, with a modest facelift to the design introduced with that series. It features the Google Tensor G5 system-on-chip, a new Qi2-ready Pixelsnap magnetic accessory support, and Gemini-powered artificial intelligence features, and comes pre-installed with Android 16 and newly-added Material 3 Expressive UI theming.

== History ==
The Pixel 10 was officially announced on August 20, 2025, with the Pixel 10 Pro, Pixel 10 Pro XL, and Pixel 10 Pro Fold at the Made by Google keynote in Brooklyn, New York. The launch event was hosted by late-night comedian Jimmy Fallon and featured appearances by NBA star Stephen Curry, Formula One driver Lando Norris, and the musical group Jonas Brothers, where they also premiered the music video of "I Can't Lose" which was also filmed on the Pixel 10 Pro.

Preorders began the same day, and it was eventually released in the United States on August 28. The Pixel 10 Series was also joined by the Pixel Watch 4 and Pixel Buds 2a as companion accessories for the lineup. The Made By Google '25 event marks the second time Google has released its flagship Pixel products in August, before the Apple September Event for its annual iPhone release.

=== Marketing ===
Ahead of the launch event, Google released several teaser videos previewing the phones, including one that poked fun at Apple's delayed launch of Apple Intelligence.

== Specifications ==
=== Design ===
The Pixel 10's appearance is very similar to that of the Pixel 9 and Pixel 10 Pro models, with flat sides, rounded corners, and an oval-shaped camera bar. However, there are 3 cameras on the Pixel 10's camera bar as opposed to 2 on the Pixel 9. It shares the same exact dimensions as the Pixel 10 Pro, with a 6.3" even-bezeled display, and introduces a telephoto sensor, making it the first non-Pro Pixel with a rear triple-camera configuration.

It comes in four different colors: Obsidian, Frost, Lemongrass, and Indigo, inspired by the “Really Blue” color from the first Pixel smartphone.Color options for the Pixel 10

Pixel 10
Diagram of a Pixel 10 smartphone in indigo.	Diagram of a Pixel 10 smartphone in frost.	Diagram of a Pixel 10 smartphone in lemongrass.	Diagram of a Pixel 10 smartphone in obsidian.
Indigo	Frost	Lemongrass	Obsidian

=== Hardware ===
Like its predecessor, the Pixel 10 features a 6.3" Actua Display with a FHD+ 1080p resolution and a 120 Hz maximum refresh rate, however the display has a greater peak brightness of 3000 nits.

A more notable change would be the camera system, which adds a 10.8 MP 5x telephoto lens in addition to the wide-angle and ultrawide cameras. But this additional camera results in a slight downgrade of the other two sensors. The 50 MP Wide and 48 MP Ultrawide sensors found in the Pixel 9 (which matched the Pixel 9 Pro models) is replaced by a smaller 50 MP wide sensor, which matches the Pixel 9a, and a 13MP ultrawide respectively. It keeps the same 10.5 MP selfie camera as the Pixel 9. Camera AI feature Auto Best Take Automatically combines multiple group photos to select the best expression for each person. Auto Unblur Uses AI to detect and sharpen blurry photos, working on both faces and other subjects.

The custom Google Tensor G5 System-on-Chip (SoC) is a noticeable upgrade over the Tensor G4 and other previous Tensor processors. Instead of using Samsung Exynos fabrication, Google switched their chip manufacturer to TSMC, and used their state of the art N3E 3nm processing node that many other smartphone chips use, such as the Apple A18 Pro and Snapdragon 8 Elite. Compared to Exynos, it provides better efficiency, performance improvements, and runs at lower temperatures, which often plagued older Pixel models. Although it uses a similar 8-core configuration as the Tensor G4, it outperforms it in single-core and multicore benchmarks, and outlasts it in terms of battery efficiency. It uses the same Samsung Exynos 5400 modem as the Tensor G4, allowing for satellite connectivity for contacting emergency services in dead zones.

The Pixel 10 also adds "Pixelsnap", a Google-branded feature that adds a circular magnet array to the back of the phone to align cases, wallets, phone mounts, stands, wireless charging pucks, and other accessories using the magnetic field. It uses the Qi2, the wireless charging standard, which introduced the MagSafe magnetic pattern found in iPhones starting with the iPhone 12 series. It supports the latest Qi2 Standard, which allows for wireless charging speeds up to 15 watts with Qi2-compatible chargers, such as the new Google Pixelsnap Charger released alongside the Pixel 10 Series. It is the first Android smartphone primarily available in the western market to have magnets built into the phone's back, like iPhones, and one of a few to include it internationally.

=== Software ===
The Pixel 10 Series comes pre-installed with Android 16, with the recently-announced Material 3 Expressive UI theming also onboard at launch. It is based on the same Material You theming introduced with the Pixel 6 series and Android 12. It is the third of the Android smartphone series that offers 7 years of support, after the Pixel 8 and Pixel 9. It changes font & icon styles, makes text, time, buttons, and icons expand and scale dynamically. Furthermore, it makes animations more fluid and makes haptics more frequent throughout interfaces, and overhauls the notification bar and Quick Settings panel to allow for more customization.

Exclusive to the Pixel 10 Series are multiple AI-powered features. Magic Cue is an agentic suggestion integration that leverages on-device machine learning to provide relevant information to the user during a text conversation or phone call. It scans information in emails, messages, notes, and surfaces relevant suggestions to autofill in a text message or display during a phone call. It is only integrated with Google services at the moment, such as Gmail, Keep Notes, Google Messages, Google Calendar, etc.

Camera Coach is a Gemini-powered virtual guide that assists the user in taking photos in the Camera app by providing step-by-step instructions for proper framing, lighting, composition and more. It does not run on-device, and therefore reliant on an internet connection to function.

Pixel Studio, an AI-powered Image Generator app introduced with the Pixel 9 series, was upgraded to use Google's Imagen 4 model, which can produce higher-quality images with more accurate prompts. It now supports people generation and text rendering within images.

Voice Translate is a toggleable, real-time call translator that runs on-device. The specialized AI voice model uses 2–3 seconds of wordexs to generate a realistic personification of your voice that is then translated into another language to the user on the other line.

It has been reported that the Battery Health Assistance feature, that slows charging speed and reduces battery capacity over time, is mandatory on all Pixel 10 models. It begins lowering voltage after 200 charge cycles and keeps adjusting until it reaches 1,000 cycles.

== Reception ==
The Pixel 10 series has received mixed to positive reviews. Stephen Radochia of Android Police describes the phone's software as easy to use, and friendly to first-time Android users, especially coming from an iPhone previously. In the same cadence, Philip Berne from TechRadar states how Pixelsnap "steals MagSafe's thunder", and the addition of the telephoto camera "tops whatever a comparable iPhone can shoot." The Verge's Allison Johnson details the AI features as "still hit-or-miss", with Magic Cue sometimes bearing irrelevant information, but "easy enough to ignore when its suggestions are off the mark." Marques Brownlee called the conversational photo editing feature built into Google Photos a "potential game-changer", doing a surprisingly good job at complex requests, although it is not exclusive to the Pixel 10 Series.

While Google touted the Tensor G5 as a "game-changer for Pixel", it received criticism for its throttling issues and under-powered performance compared to Apple and Qualcomm's latest chip-sets. 9to5Google suggest that the G5 "doesn’t feel like a quantum leap", as many supposed would be certain after the switch to TSMC for Tensor's fabrication, but its infamous overheating issue "seems mostly solved in the Pixel 10". Meanwhile, performance tests of the regular Pixel 10 conducted by GSMArena found that the G5 throttles down to 28% of its max performance, with a similar test conducted on the Pixel 10 Pro and Pro XL resulting in a 42% and 54% sustained performance respectively. Android Authority reports that "CPU and GPU performance are up by at least 25%", but still "benchmarks well behind similarly priced rivals, including the iPhone 16 and Galaxy S25."
