= Pixel 10a =

2026 Android smartphone by Google

- The front side of the Pixel 10a, in the Lavender color
- Brand: Google
- Developer: Google
- Type: Smartphone
- Series: Pixel
- First released: March 5, 2026; 6 months ago
- Predecessor: Pixel 9a
- Related: Pixel 10, Pixel 10 Pro & 10 Pro XL, Pixel 10 Pro Fold
- Form factor: Slate
- Colors: Berry, Lavender, Fog, Obsidian
- Dimensions: H: 6.1 in (153.9 mm); W: 2.9 in (73.0 mm); D: 0.4 in (9.0 mm)
- Weight: 6.5 oz (180 g)
- Operating system: Original: Android 16; Current: Android 17
- System-on-chip: Google Tensor G4
- Modem: Exynos 5400
- Memory: 8 GB LPDDR5X
- Storage: 128 (except India) or 256 GB UFS 3.1
- SIM: Nano SIM and eSIM
- Battery: 5100 mAh
- Charging: 30W fast charging 10W Qi wireless charging
- Rear camera: 48 MP, f/1.7, 82° (wide), 1/2", 0.8 μm, Quad-PD Dual Pixel CLAF, OIS; 13 MP, f/2.2, 120˚ (ultrawide), 1/3.1", 1.12 μm, EIS; Pixel Shift, Auto-HDR, panorama; 4K@30/60fps, 1080p@30/60/120fps; gyro-EIS, OIS
- Front camera: 13 MP, f/2.2, 96.1° (ultrawide), 1.12 μm; Auto-HDR, panorama; 4K@30fps, 1080p@30fps
- Display: 6.3 in (160 mm) 1080p FHD+ pOLED; 1080 × 2424 px resolution, 20:9 aspect ratio (~422.2 ppi density); HDR, 60-120 Hz refresh rate
- Connectivity: Wi-Fi 6E + 2x2 MIMO; Bluetooth 6.0; NFC; Google Cast; Dual-band GNSS (GPS / GLONASS / Galileo); USB-C: USB 10Gbps
- Data inputs: Accelerometer; Ambient light sensor; Barometer; Fingerprint scanner; Gyroscope; Magnetometer; Proximity sensor
- Water resistance: IP68
- Made in: Vietnam, India
- Other: Gorilla Glass 7i cover; Composite matte back; Titan M2 security module
- Website: Pixel 10a

The Pixel 10a is an Android-based smartphone designed, developed, and marketed by Google as part of the Google Pixel product line. It serves as a mid-range variant of the Pixel 10 series, with similarities in design, software, and other features to its more premium counterparts.

== History ==
The Pixel 10a was teased in a preview posted to the Made By Google YouTube channel on February 4, 2026, indicating a pre-order date of February 18. This puts its one month earlier in the year than its predecessor the Pixel 9a, and nearly 4 months earlier than the Pixel 8a the year prior to that. Its release date was on March 5, 2026, making it by far the earliest date for a Pixel smartphone to be released during a calendar year.

On April 7 of that year, the phone became available for pre-order in Japan, with a release date set for May 20. An exclusive color variant called Isai Blue was added in addition to the other colors; it is only available in a 256 GB configuration, comes in a custom box, with a bumper case and stickers additionally. Google partnered with the art lifestyle brand HERALBONY to develop the Japan-exclusive model to select the color and design the stickers, and the software includes a matching wallpaper and themed icon pack designed by their artists.

== Specifications ==
=== Design ===
The Pixel 10a has a nearly identical footprint as the Pixel 9a, with the rear cameras being entirely flush with the body instead of a thin protrusion, eliminating the camera cutout found on the other models in the family. The body is also squared up with flat rails and rounded edges, matching the rest of the Pixel 10 series.

It comes in four colors primarily, namely Berry, Lavender, Fog, and Obsidian. Upon its announcement, Google also updated the Pixel Buds 2a wireless earbuds by adding Fog and Berry color variants to match the phone.

Pixel 10a
Diagram of a Pixel 10a smartphone in light purple.	Diagram of a Pixel 10a smartphone in red.	Diagram of a Pixel 10a smartphone in light green.	Diagram of a Pixel 10a smartphone in black.
Lavender	Berry	Fog	Obsidian

=== Hardware ===
Nearly all hardware specifications remain unchanged from its predecessor. All cameras use identical sensors, with 48 MP resolution for the wide, 13 MP for the ultrawide, and 13 MP for the front-facing selfie cameras.

The display has a slightly higher peak brightness at 3000 nits, but the same resolution and 120 Hz refresh rate. The bezels are nearly 10% thinner, although visually, it looks identical. It upgrades to Corning Gorilla Glass 7i on the screen, adding additional impact resistance and durability.

A notable similarity is using the previous generation Tensor G4, the same chip found in the Pixel 9 series, to power the phone instead of using the current generation Tensor G5 SoC. This marks an alteration in the precedent established by A-series Pixels starting with the Pixel 6a onwards, which used the same Tensor processor as the current generation.

Dissimilar from the Pixel 9a is the upgraded Exynos 5400 modem, the same found in the Pixel 9 and Pixel 9 Pro phones, as well as the current Pixel 10 series. This gains the Pixel 10a satellite connectivity, enabling the ability to contact emergency services via satellite through a feature dubbed "Satellite SOS".

=== Software ===
The Pixel 10a ships with Android 16 and the updated Material 3 Expressive UI out of the box. Based on Material You UI design language, Material 3 Expressive updates font & icon styles, makes text, time, buttons, and icons expand and scale dynamically. It also makes animations more fluid and haptic feedback more frequent throughout interfaces. It gives the notification bar with a updated look and allows users to resize tiles in the Quick Settings panel, allowing for more customization.

Much akin to the rest of the Pixel 10 Series, it ships with multiple AI-powered features. New ones that were introduced with that generation include Camera Coach, a Gemini-powered guide in the Camera app that provides step-by-step instructions for proper framing and composition when taking photos, and Conversational photo editing in Google Photos, allowing users to dictate changes they wish to make to an image. Some features like Magic Cue and various AI models that run on-device, appear to be excluded from the Pixel 10a, most likely due to memory constraints and a less-powerful TPU compared to Tensor G5 found in the rest of the Pixel 10 series.
