= Google Tensor =

Series of system-on-chip processors

- Illustration of the first-generation Tensor chip
- Launched: October 5, 2021; 5 years ago
- Designed by: Google
- Common manufacturer: Samsung (G1–G4) TSMC (G5 onwards)
- GPUs: Mali, PowerVR
- Co-processor: Titan
- Application: Pixel

Google Tensor is a series of ARM64-based system-on-chip (SoC) processors designed by Google for its Pixel devices. It was originally conceptualized in 2016, following the introduction of the first Pixel smartphone, though actual developmental work did not enter full swing until 2020. The first-generation Tensor chip debuted on the Pixel 6 smartphone series in 2021, and was succeeded by the Tensor G2 chip in 2022, G3 in 2023, G4 in 2024, G5 in 2025 and G6 in 2026. Tensor has been generally well received by critics.

== Development ==
=== Background ===
Development on a Google-designed system-on-chip (SoC) first began in April 2016, after the introduction of the company's first Pixel smartphone, although Google CEO Sundar Pichai and hardware chief Rick Osterloh agreed it would likely take an extended period of time before the product was ready. The next year, the company's hardware division assembled a team of 76 semiconductor researchers specializing in artificial intelligence (AI) and machine learning (ML), to work on the chip. Beginning in 2017, Google began to include custom-designed co-processors in its Pixel smartphones, namely the Pixel Visual Core on the Pixel 2 and Pixel 3 series and the Pixel Neural Core on the Pixel 4 series.

By April 2020, the company had made "significant progress" toward a custom ARM-based processor for its Pixel and Chromebook devices, codenamed "Whitechapel". At Google parent company Alphabet Inc.'s quarterly earnings investor call that October, Pichai expressed excitement at the company's "deeper investments" in hardware, which some interpreted as an allusion to Whitechapel. The Neural Core was not included on the Pixel 5, which was released in 2020; Google explained that the phone's Snapdragon 765G SoC already achieved the camera performance the company had been aiming for. In April 2021, 9to5Google reported that Whitechapel would power Google's next Pixel smartphones. Google was also in talks to acquire Nuvia prior to its acquisition by Qualcomm in 2021.

Google officially unveiled the chip, named Tensor, in August, as part of a preview of its Pixel 6 and Pixel 6 Pro smartphones. Previous Pixel smartphones had used Qualcomm Snapdragon chips, with 2021's Pixel 5a being the final Pixel phone to do so. Pichai later obliquely noted that the development of Tensor and the Pixel 6 resulted in more off-the-shelf solutions for Pixel phones released in 2020 and early 2021. In September 2022, The Verge reported that a Tensor-powered successor to the Pixelbook laptop with a planned 2023 release had been canceled due to cost-cutting measures.

=== Design ===
"Tensor" is a reference to Google's TensorFlow and Tensor Processing Unit technologies, and the chip is developed by the Google Silicon team housed within the company's hardware division, led by vice president and general manager Phil Carmack alongside senior director Monika Gupta, in conjunction with the Google Research division.

Tensor's microarchitecture consists of two large cores, two medium cores, and four small cores; this arrangement is unusual for octa-core SoCs, which typically only have one large core. Carmack explained that this was so Tensor could remain efficient at intense workloads by running both large cores simultaneously at a low frequency to manage the various co-processors. Osterloh has stated that Tensor's performance is difficult to quantify using synthetic benchmarks, but should instead be characterized by the many ML capabilities it enables, such as advanced speech recognition, real-time language translation, the ability to unblur photographs, and HDR-like frame-by-frame processing for videos.

== Models ==
		G1 (Original)	G2	G3	G4	G5	G6
Pixel devices		6, 6 Pro, and 6a	7, 7 Pro, 7a, Fold, and Tablet	8, 8 Pro, and 8a	9, 9 Pro, 9 Pro XL, 9 Pro Fold, 9a, and 10a	10, 10 Pro, 10 Pro XL, and 10 Pro Fold	11, 11 Pro, 11 Pro XL, and 11 Pro Fold
SoC	Launch date	October 19, 2021	October 6, 2022	October 4, 2023	August 22, 2024	August 20, 2025	August 20, 2026
SoC	Model number	GS101 (S5P9845)	GS201 (S5P9855)	GS301 (S5P9865)	GS401 (S5P9875)	GS501	—N/a
SoC	Codename	Whitechapel	Cloudripper	Zuma	Zuma Pro	Laguna	
SoC	Fabrication	5 nm (Samsung 5LPE)		4 nm (Samsung 4LPP)	4 nm (Samsung 4LPP+)	3 nm (TSMC N3P)	
SoC	Manufacturer	Samsung				TSMC	
CPU	ISA	ARMv8.2-A		ARMv9	ARMv9.2-A		ARMv9.3-A
CPU	Bit width	64-bit					
CPU	μarch	Octa-core: 2× 2.8 GHz Cortex-X1; 2× 2.25 GHz Cortex-A76; 4× 1.8 GHz Cortex-A55	Octa-core: 2× 2.85 GHz Cortex-X1; 2× 2.35 GHz Cortex-A78; 4× 1.8 GHz Cortex-A55	Nona-core: 1× 2.91 GHz Cortex-X3; 4× 2.37 GHz Cortex-A715; 4× 1.7 GHz Cortex-A510	Octa-core: 1× 3.1 GHz Cortex-X4; 3× 2.6 GHz Cortex-A720; 4× 1.92 GHz Cortex-A520	Octa-core: 1× 3.78 GHz Cortex-X4; 5× 3.05 GHz Cortex-A725; 2× 2.25 GHz Cortex-A520	Hepta-core: 1× 4.11 GHz C1-Ultra; 4× 3.38 GHz C1-Pro; 2× 2.65 GHz C1-Pro
CPU	Security	TrustZone (Trusty OS)					
GPU	μarch	Mali-G78 MP20	Mali-G710 MP7	Mali-G715 MP7		PowerVR DXT-48-1536	PowerVR CXTP-48-1536
GPU	Frequency	848 MHz	848 MHz	890 MHz	940 MHz	1100 MHz	1286 MHz
GPU	Performance (FP32)	1085.4 GFLOPs	759.8 GFLOPs	1594.8 GFLOPs	1684.4 GFLOPs	1689.6 GFLOPs	1975.3 GFLOPs
RAM	Type	LPDDR5		LPDDR5X			
RAM	Bus width	4× 16-bit (quad-channel)					
RAM	Speed	3200 MHz		4266 MHz			
RAM	Bandwidth	51.2 GB/s		68.2 GB/s			
Storage	Type	UFS 3.1				UFS 4.0	
ISP	NPU	1st Gen Edge TPU (Abrolhos) @ 1066 MHz	2nd Gen Edge TPU (Janeiro) @ 1066 MHz	3rd Gen Edge TPU (Rio) @ 1119 MHz		4th Gen TPU	5th Gen TPU
Wireless	Modem (external)	Exynos 5123b	Exynos 5300g	Exynos 5300i	Exynos 5400c or Exynos 5300t (Pixel 9a only)	Exynos 5400i	MediaTek M90
Wireless	Wi-Fi	Wi-Fi 6 and Wi-Fi 6E		Wi-Fi 7 or Wi-Fi 6E (Pixel 8a, 9a and 10a)		Wi-Fi 7 or Wi-Fi 6E (for Pixel 10)	
Wireless	Wi-Fi	Bluetooth 5.2		Bluetooth 5.3		Bluetooth 6.0	
Wireless	Navigation	Dual-band GNSS					

=== Original ===
The first-generation Tensor chip debuted on the Pixel 6 and Pixel 6 Pro, which were officially announced in October 2021 at the Pixel Fall Launch event. It was later reused for the Pixel 6a, a mid-range variant of the Pixel 6 series which was announced in July 2022. Despite being marketed as developed by Google, close-up examinations revealed that the chip contains numerous similarities with Samsung's Exynos series.

=== G2 ===
A second-generation Tensor chip was in development by October 2021, codenamed "Cloudripper". At the annual Google I/O keynote in July 2022, Google announced that the chip would debut on the Pixel 7 and Pixel 7 Pro smartphones, which were officially announced on October 6 at the annual Made by Google event. The chip is marketed as "Google Tensor G2". The chip was also used to power the Pixel 7a, Pixel Fold foldable smartphone, and Pixel Tablet which was unveiled in May 2023 during the annual I/O keynote.

=== G3 ===
Samsung had begun testing Tensor G3 by August 2022, codenamed "Zuma". Announced in October 2023, the chip was used to power the Pixel 8a, Pixel 8 and Pixel 8 Pro. This chip is notable for having an unusual 9-core configuration, while all other generations have a more common 8-core configuration.

=== G4 ===
Codename: "Zuma Pro". Devices: Pixel 9, Pixel 9a, Pixel 9 Pro, Pixel 9 Pro XL, Pixel 9 Pro Fold and Pixel 10a.

=== G5 ===
Codename: "Laguna". Devices: Pixel 10, Pixel 10 Pro, Pixel 10 Pro XL and Pixel 10 Pro Fold.

The Tensor G5 features an Imagination Technologies PowerVR DXT-48-1536 GPU. This marked a departure from the Arm Mali GPUs used in previous Pixel phones, and a choice that was considered uncommon for a flagship device at the time of its release.

Upon the Pixel 10's release, reviewers and users noted that the GPU's performance was subpar, particularly in intensive applications like game emulation. This lackluster performance was attributed to the inclusion of an outdated GPU driver in the phone's initial software. Imagination Technologies had already released a newer driver with improved performance and compatibility, but this was not included with the Pixel 10 at launch. Google later stated that it would release GPU driver updates to improve performance in future software updates for the Pixel 10 series.

=== G6 ===
The Tensor G6 chip, codenamed "Malibu," was officially announced on August 12, 2026, and powers the Pixel 11, Pixel 11 Pro, Pixel 11 Pro XL, and Pixel 11 Pro Fold.

== Reception ==
At launch, Tensor was well received. Philip Michaels of Tom's Guide praised the Pixel 6 and Pixel 6 Pro's Tensor-powered features and video enhancements, as did Marques Brownlee and Wired's Julian Chokkattu. Chokkattu's colleague Lily Hay Newman also highlighted the chip's security capabilities, declaring them Tensor's strongest selling point. Jacon Krol of CNN Underscored wrote that Tensor delivered "some of the most fluid and fastest performance" on a smartphone, though Android Authority's Jimmy Westenberg was ambivalent. Ryne Hager of Android Police thought the chip's performance was acceptable to the everyday user, but was disappointed that Google did not offer more years of Android updates given it was no longer bound by Qualcomm's contractual terms. TechRadar reviewer James Peckham commended Tensor as a "standout feature", though his colleague David Lumb described the chip's performance as "strong but not class-leading".

== See also ==
- Apple silicon
