= Pixel 8a =

2024 Android smartphone developed by Google

- Developer: Google
- Type: Smartphone
- Series: Pixel
- First released: May 14, 2024; 2 years ago
- Availability by region: May 2024: Australia; Austria; Belgium; Canada; Czech Republic; Denmark; France; Germany; Ireland; Italy; Japan; Netherlands; Norway; Poland; Portugal; Singapore; Spain; Sweden; Switzerland; Taiwan; United Kingdom; United States
- Discontinued: March 19, 2025
- Predecessor: Pixel 7a
- Successor: Pixel 9a
- Related: Pixel 8 & 8 Pro
- Compatible networks: GSM/EDGE; UMTS/HSPA+; LTE, LTE Advanced; 5G sub-6 / mmWave
- Form factor: Slate
- Colors: Obsidian; Porcelain; Bay; Aloe
- Dimensions: 152.1 mm (5.99 in) H 72.7 mm (2.86 in) W 8.9 mm (0.35 in) D
- Weight: 188 g (6.6 oz)
- Operating system: Original: Android 14; Current: Android 17
- System-on-chip: Google Tensor G3
- Modem: Exynos 5300i
- Memory: 8 GB LPDDR5X
- Storage: 128 or 256 GB UFS 3.1
- SIM: Nano SIM and eSIM
- Battery: 4492 mAh
- Charging: Fast charging up to 18W; 7.5W Qi wireless charging
- Rear camera: 64 MP, f/1.9, 80° (wide), 1/1.73", 0.8 μm, Quad-Bayer dual pixel PDAF, OIS; 13 MP, f/2.2, 120˚ (ultrawide), 1.12 μm; Dual-LED flash, Pixel Shift, Auto-HDR, panorama; 4K@30/60fps, 1080p@30/60/120/240fps; gyro-EIS, OIS
- Front camera: 13 MP, f/2.2, 20mm (ultrawide), 1.12 μm; Auto-HDR, panorama; 4K@30fps, 1080p@30fps
- Display: 6.1 in (154.9 mm) 1080p FHD+ OLED; 2400 × 1080 px resolution, 20:9 aspect ratio (~430 ppi density); HDR, 60-120 Hz refresh rate, Corning Gorilla Glass 3
- Sound: Stereo speakers; 2 microphones; Noise suppression
- Connectivity: Wi-Fi 6E + HE80 + MIMO; Bluetooth 5.3; NFC; Google Cast; GNSS (GPS / GLONASS / Galileo / QZSS); USB-C: USB 10Gbps
- Data inputs: Multi-touch screen; Fingerprint scanner (under display, optical); Accelerometer; Gyroscope; Proximity sensor; Ambient light sensor; Barometer; Magnetometer
- Water resistance: IP67
- Website: Pixel 8a

The Pixel 8a is an Android-based smartphone designed, developed, and marketed by Google as part of its Google Pixel product line. It serves as a mid-range variant within the Pixel 8 series. Pixel 8a shares a similar design with the rest of the Pixel 8s, with the major differences between them being the thinner camera visor. The device has similar features and functionality with the Pixel 8, with the main focus of this phone being the AI tools that come bundled with it.

== History ==
The Pixel 8a was announced and made available for pre-order in the US on May 7, 2024. Unlike most previous A-series Pixel phones, the Pixel 8a was not announced at the annual Google I/O event, instead coming a week earlier.

== Design ==
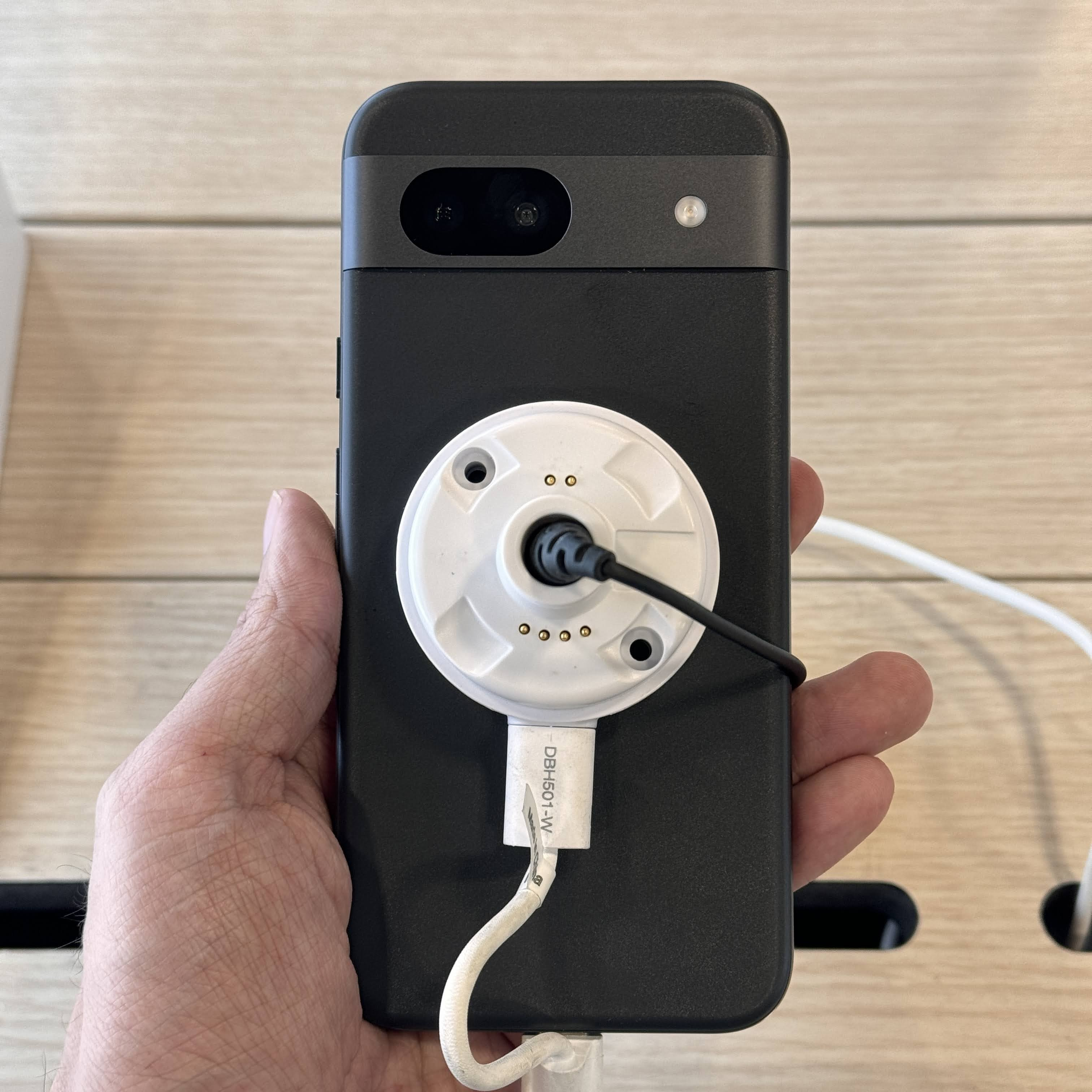
The back of Pixel 8a in Obsidian

The front is made of Corning Gorilla Glass 3, the back is made of plastic, and the frame is made of aluminum. The Pixel 8a also features an IP67 dust and water resistance rating.

Generally, the only design differences between the Pixel 8a and the Pixel 7a are the matte coating of the back and more rounded corners, similar to the Pixel 8.

On the bottom side of the smartphone there is a USB-C port supporting USB 10Gbps and two cutouts for the loudspeaker (to the right from USB-C) and for the microphone. On the top side, there is a mmWave antenna on the US model and the additional microphone. On the left side, there is a SIM tray for one nano-SIM card. On the right side, there is the volume rocker and the power button.

The Pixel 8a is sold in the following colors:

Color	Name
	Obsidian
	Porcelain
	Bay
	Aloe
