= Pixel 7a =

2023 Android smartphone developed by Google

- Front side of the Pixel 7a
- Brand: Google
- Manufacturer: Foxconn
- Type: Smartphone
- Series: Pixel
- First released: May 10, 2023; 3 years ago
- Discontinued: May 7, 2024
- Units sold: <10 million
- Predecessor: Pixel 6a
- Successor: Pixel 8a
- Related: Pixel 7 & 7 Pro
- Compatible networks: GSM/EDGE; UMTS/HSPA+, CDMA EVDO Rev A, WCDMA; LTE, LTE Advanced; 5G sub-6 / mmWave
- Form factor: Slate
- Colors: Charcoal; Snow; Sea; Coral
- Dimensions: 152 mm (6.0 in) H 72.9 mm (2.87 in) W 9 mm (0.35 in) D
- Weight: 193.5 g (6.83 oz)
- Operating system: Original: Android 13; Current: Android 17
- System-on-chip: Google Tensor G2
- CPU: Octa-core (2x2.85 GHz Cortex-X1 & 2x2.35 GHz Cortex-A78 & 4x1.80 GHz Cortex-A55)
- GPU: Mali-G710 MP7
- Modem: Samsung Exynos 5300
- Memory: 8 GB RAM
- Storage: 128 GB UFS 3.1
- Removable storage: None
- SIM: Nano-SIM and eSIM
- Battery: Li-Po 4385 mAh Non-removable
- Charging: Fast charging up to 30W W PD 3.0; Wireless charging 7.5 W (with Pixel Stand); 5 W
- Rear camera: 64 MP, f/1.9, 26mm (wide), 1/1.73", 0.8 μm, dual pixel PDAF, OIS; 13 MP, f/2.2, 120˚ (ultrawide), 1.12 μm; Dual-LED flash, Pixel Shift, Auto-HDR, panorama; 4K@30/60fps, 1080p@30/60/120/240fps; gyro-EIS, OIS
- Front camera: 13 MP, f/2.2, 20mm (ultrawide), 1.12 μm; Auto-HDR, panorama; 4K@30fps, 1080p@30/60fps
- Display: 6.1 in (154.9 mm) 1080p FHD+ OLED; 2400 × 1080 px resolution, 20:9 aspect ratio (~431 ppi density); HDR, 90 Hz refresh rate, Corning Gorilla Glass 3; Always on
- Sound: Stereo speakers, no audio jack
- Connectivity: Wi-Fi 6E + HE80 + MIMO; Bluetooth 5.3; NFC; Google Cast; GNSS (GPS / GLONASS / Galileo / QZSS); USB-C: USB 10Gbps
- Data inputs: Multi-touch screen; Fingerprint scanner (under display, optical); Accelerometer; Gyroscope; Proximity sensor; Compass
- Water resistance: IP67, up to 1 m (3.3 ft) for 30 minutes
- Model: GWKK3, GHL1X, G0DZQ, G82U8
- Codename: Lynx
- Hearing aid compatibility: M3/T4 HAC rating
- Website: store.google.com/product/pixel_7a

The Pixel 7a is an Android-based smartphone designed, developed, and marketed by Google as part of its Google Pixel product line. It serves as a smaller variant of the Pixel 7 and Pixel 7 Pro. It was announced at the annual Google I/O keynote in May 2023 and succeeded by the Pixel 8a the following year.

== Specifications ==
=== Hardware ===
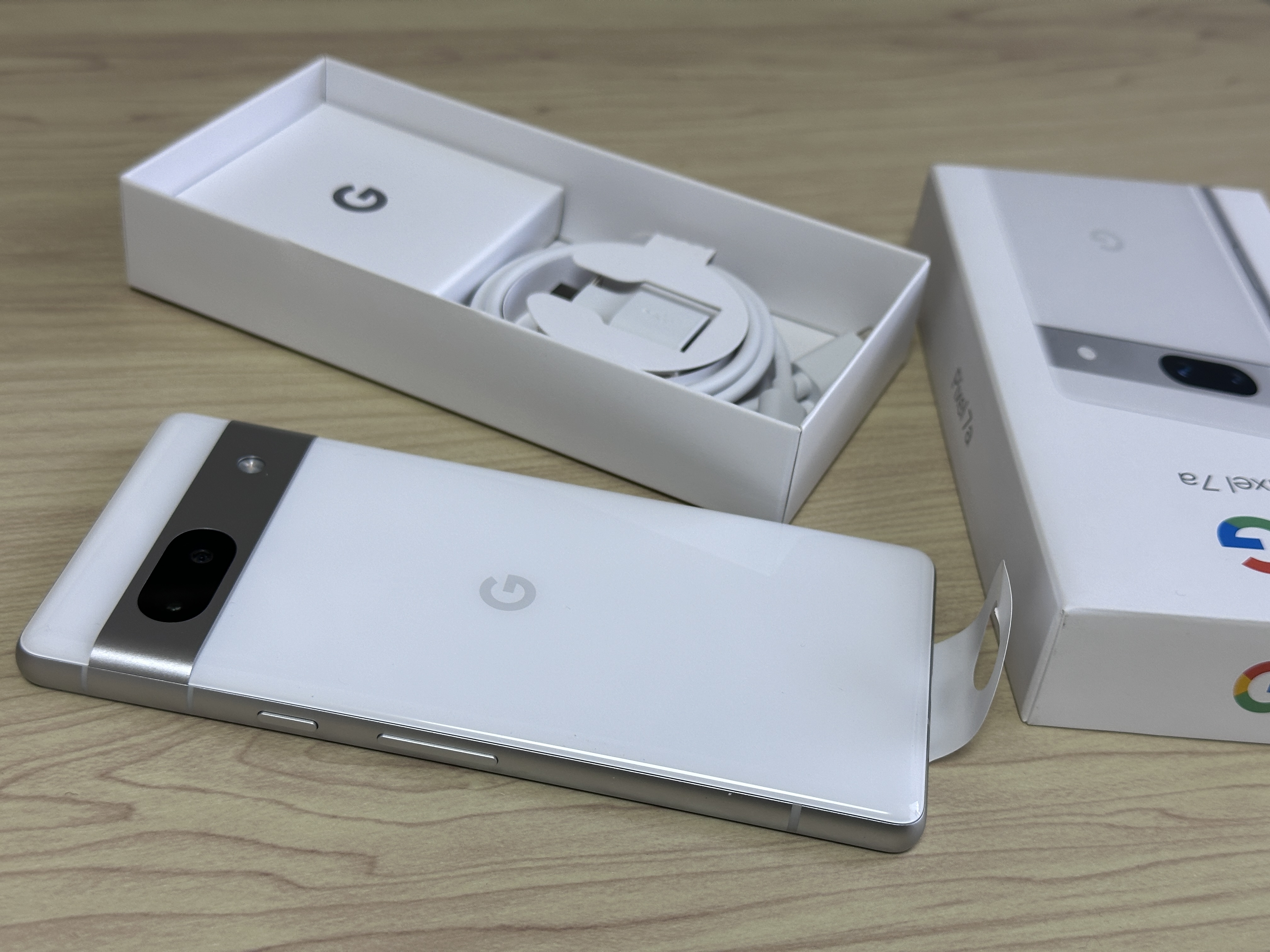
Pixel 7a in Snow color

The Pixel 7a is built with an aluminum frame, a plastic back and Gorilla Glass 3 for the screen. The smartphone has an IP67 water protection rating. The design includes a metallic camera bar matching the frame. It has stereo loudspeakers, one located on the bottom edge and the other doubling as the earpiece. A USB-C port is used for charging and connecting other accessories. The Google Pixel 7a was available in the following colors:

Color	Name
	Charcoal
	Snow
	Sea
	Coral

The Pixel 7a uses the Google Tensor G2 system on a chip, with 8 GB of RAM and 128 GB of non-expandable UFS 3.1 internal storage.

The Pixel 7a has a 4385 mAh battery, which is a slight decrease from the Pixel 6a at 4410 mAh. It is capable of fast charging at up to 18 W, as well as wireless charging at up to 7.5 W using the Pixel Stand and up to 5 W using other Qi-certified chargers. Adaptive charging can help with battery life on the phone.

The Pixel 7a features a 6.1-inch 1080p OLED display with HDR support and a 90 Hz refresh rate. The display has a 20:9 aspect ratio, and a circular cutout in the upper center for the front-facing camera.

The Pixel 7a includes dual rear-facing cameras. The wide 26 mm f/1.9 lens has a 64-megapixel sensor, while the ultrawide 120° f/2.2 lens has a 13-megapixel sensor; the front-facing camera uses a 13-megapixel sensor. It is capable of recording 4K video at 30 or 60 fps.

=== Software ===
The Pixel 7a ships with Android 13 at launch, which is upgradable to Android 16, based on the Android Open Source Project. It is expected to receive 5 years of major OS upgrades and security updates.

In March 2024, the Pixel 7a, along with the Pixel 6, Pixel 6 Pro, and Pixel 6a, received the Circle to Search feature which allows user to search for circled items.

== Battery swelling and Extended Repair Program ==
Battery defects caused many Pixel 7a units to swell, discharge unusually quickly, or produce odd odors. On April 23, 2025, Google officially extended the repair program for qualified units. All qualified devices were given one battery replacement with no charge, even if the device was past the warranty period.

Only devices purchased in Australia, Canada, India, Japan, Malaysia, Singapore, Taiwan, United States, United Kingdom, Switzerland, and all European Economic Area countries were considered qualified under the extension.

Replacement batteries were provided to repair centers for walk-in repairs in the United States, Canada, United Kingdom, Germany, Japan, Singapore, Australia, and France. With the United States and India offering the option to mail-in the device to Google repair centers.

For 7a users with qualified devices that were not located in a location where walk-in repair or mail-in repairs were offered, users were able to receive an appeasement option based on their warranty status.

Out of warranty users located outside walk-in repair or mail-in repair locations were given:

- $200 USD converted to the user's local currency
- $300 USD converted to the user's local currency as a discount code usable within the Google Store towards their next Pixel device.

In warranty users located outside walk-in repair or mail-in repair locations were given $456 USD converted to the user's local currency.
