= Pixel Watch 5 =

2026 smartwatch developed by Google

- Brand: Google
- Type: Smartwatch
- Series: Pixel
- First released: August 20, 2026; 58 days ago
- Predecessor: Pixel Watch 4
- Dimensions: Diameter: 41 mm (1.6 in) / 1.8 in (45 mm); Height: 12.3 mm (0.5 in)
- Weight: 31.0 g (1.09 oz) (41mm version) / 36.7 g (1.29 oz) (45mm version)
- Operating system: Wear OS 7
- System-on-chip: Qualcomm Snapdragon W5 Gen 2 Accelerated
- CPU: 4x ARM Cortex A53 + 1x ARM Cortex M55 (co-processor)
- GPU: 1 GHz Adreno A702
- Memory: 3 GB LPDDR4
- Storage: 64 GB eMMC flash
- SIM: eSIM (LTE models)
- Battery: 332 mAh (41mm) / 465 mAh (45mm)
- Display: 408 × 408 px (41mm) / 456 × 456 px (45mm) at 320 ppi; LTPO OLED; 1-60 Hz refresh rate
- Sound: Speaker; Microphone
- Connectivity: Wi-Fi 4 + MIMO; Bluetooth 6.0; NFC; Dual-band GNSS (GPS / GLONASS / Galileo / NB-NTN / Beidou); Ultra-wideband (UWB) chip
- Data inputs: Haptic crown; Side button; Touchless one-handed gestures; 3-axis accelerometer; Gyroscope; Barometer; Magnetometer
- Water resistance: IP68 / 5 ATM
- Other: Custom 3D Corning Gorilla Glass 5
- Website: https://store.google.com/product/pixel_watch_5?hl=en-US

The Pixel Watch 5 is a Wear OS-based smartwatch designed, developed, and marketed by Google as part of the Google Pixel product line. It succeeds the Pixel Watch 4, iterating on its design and feature set and upgrading specs.

== History ==
In May 2026, a pre-release Pixel Watch 5 unit was lost in the ocean off the coast of the island of Saint Martin and found by a scuba diver who shared images of the device on the social media platform X, the device was successfully returned to the owner after making rounds on various tech news websites.

In late-June 2026, the watches were approved by the Federal Communications Commission (FCC).

On July 7, 2026, Google sent out invites for the next Made by Google event, set for August 12 in New York City.

In August 2026, the Pixel Watch 5's design was teased in a video, showing off the Pixel Watch 5 lineup, and Stephen Curry bands for the Pixel Watch 5 were leaked soon after.

== Features ==
The Pixel Watch 5 includes several new health features including insulin resistance trends, blood pressure trends, sleep breathing quality trends, and breathing emergency detection. These are powered by Google's wearable foundation models, including SensorLM.
