= ARM C-series =

Family of ARM processor cores for consumer devices

General information
- Designed by: ARM Holdings

Architecture and classification
- Instruction set: A64, A32, T32; ARMv9.3-A

The ARM C-series is a family of ARM architecture processor cores developed by Arm Holdings, introduced in 2025 as part of the Armv9.3 architecture. Designed for consumer and mobile devices, the C-series succeeds ARM's Cortex-A and Cortex-X naming scheme.

All C-series cores are currently 64-bit processors implementing the ARMv9.3-A architecture and feature integrated Scalable Matrix Extension 2 (SME2) technology for accelerated AI workloads. The family emphasizes on-device artificial intelligence capabilities alongside traditional application processing performance.

== C-series CPU variants ==
64-bit C-series
Year	Small	Medium	Large	Flagship
2025	C1-Nano	C1-Pro	C1-Premium	C1-Ultra
2026	—N/a	C2-Pro	—N/a	C2-Ultra

The C-series family currently includes four performance tiers: Nano, Pro, Premium and Ultra. Nano are in-order designs, the other three tiers provide out-of-order execution. Each tier targets different performance, energy and area efficiency requirements.

=== C1-series ===
The C1-series was introduced in September 2025 and is the first CPU family built on the Armv9.3 architecture. This architecture includes native support for SME2, providing hardware acceleration for matrix operations commonly used in AI and machine learning workloads.:

- C1-Ultra is the flagship high-performance core, designed for demanding AI tasks and peak single-threaded performance. It features the widest micro-architecture in the industry and achieves significant performance improvements over previous-generation ARM cores through double-digit instructions per cycle (IPC) gains. It succeeds Cortex-X925.
- C1-Premium is described as ARM's first sub-flagship CPU, offering comparable performance to C1-Ultra in a significantly smaller area footprint. It maintains similar benchmark performance while reducing core size, making it suitable for designs where area efficiency is critical. It introduces a new tier.
- C1-Pro is optimized for sustained performance across extended workloads such as gaming, video processing, and multitasking. It emphasizes performance per watt across the entire power range and includes enhanced branch prediction and memory system updates. It succeeds Cortex-A725.
- C1-Nano is the smallest and most power-efficient core in the family, designed for always-on AI tasks, background processing, and low-power scenarios. It is particularly suited for wearables and compact consumer devices. It succeeds Cortex-A520.

SME2 is directly integrated into all C-series CPUs through the Armv9.3 architecture. This extension accelerates matrix-heavy operations used in large language models, media processing, speech recognition, computer vision, and multimodal applications.

The C1-DSU serves as the interconnect and shared cache infrastructure for C-series CPU clusters. It supports the latest architectural features and includes low-power optimizations, enabling improved bandwidth scaling and power efficiency compared to previous-generation DSU implementations.

Specification	C1-Nano	C1-Pro	C1-Premium	C1-Ultra
Architecture & Extensions
Architecture	Armv9.3-A (with some Armv9.4 features)			
ISA	AArch64			
Extensions	SVE2, SME2 (optional), MTE, Cryptography, RAS		SVE2, SME2, MTE, Cryptography, RAS	
Microarchitecture
Pipeline Type	In-order	Out-of-Order		
Superscalar	Yes			
Pipeline Features	Decoupled predict/fetch, improved branch prediction, upgraded vector forwarding	Improved branch prediction, enhanced memory subsystem	Streamlined microarchitecture, thermal-aware performance scaling	Expanded caches, advanced prefetching, low-latency pipelines
Performance Characteristics
Core Type	High-efficiency small	Sustained performance big/mid	Sub-flagship	Flagship
Performance Focus	Power reduction, instruction flow efficiency	Sustained workloads, gaming	Area-optimized premium performance	Best-in-class IPC, peak single-thread
Cluster Configuration
Max CPUs in Cluster	Up to 14			
Typical Cluster Role	Background processing, always-on AI	Mid/big core in heterogeneous clusters	Sub-flagship in premium SoCs	Primary performance core
Physical Addressing	40-bit			
Memory Hierarchy
L1 I-Cache	32KB or 64KB	64KB		
L1 D-Cache	32KB or 64KB	64KB	128KB	
L2 Cache	Optional, 128KB, 256KB, 384KB, 512KB	128KB, 256KB, 512KB, 1MB	Up to 1MB	Up to 3MB
L3 Cache	Optional, 256KB to 32MB, Shared via DSU			
ECC Support	Yes			
Design Flexibility
Area-Optimized Configuration	Yes, by design	Yes, optional	Yes, by default	Yes, optional
Power Optimization Features	Idle clock gating during low-IPC execution	—	Dynamic task distribution, thermal-aware scaling	—
Target Use Cases
Primary Applications	Wearables, always-on AI, background tasks, voice activation	Gaming, video processing, multitasking, mid-tier flagships	Premium smartphones, sub-flagship SoCs	Flagship smartphones, laptops, peak performance workloads

=== C2-series ===
The C2-series was introduced in September 2026 and is built on the Armv9.3 architecture.

== Platform integration ==
The C-series CPUs are designed as part of the ARM Lumex compute subsystem (CSS) platform, which provides a complete reference design for mobile and consumer devices. The platform approach allows chip manufacturers to integrate C-series cores with other ARM intellectual property and customize configurations to meet specific product requirements. Different combinations of C-series cores can be deployed across various device tiers.

== Licensing ==
Like other ARM processor designs, C-series cores are not manufactured or sold directly by ARM Holdings. Instead, ARM licenses synthesizable hardware descriptions and development tools to semiconductor companies, which integrate the cores into custom system-on-chip (SoC) designs. This licensing model allows manufacturers to optimize the implementation for specific process nodes, power targets, and feature sets.

== See also ==
- ARM architecture family
- ARM Cortex-A
- List of ARM processors
