= Satellite emergency notification device =

Portable emergency satellite communication device

- Standard for Satellite Emergency Notification Devices (SEND)
- Abbreviation: SEND Standard
- Status: Active (since 2011)
- Committee: Special Committee 128 (SC-128)
- Domain: Satellite communications, Emergency positioning, Search and Rescue (SAR)
- Website: rtcm.org

A Satellite Emergency Notification Device (SEND) is a portable emergency notification and locating device which uses commercial satellite systems rather than the COSPAS-SARSAT satellite system. An example of this device is SPOT.

The devices use an internal GPS chip to gather location information. When the SEND is triggered, this information is sent via commercial satellite to a commercial monitoring agency whose role is to pass the information to an appropriate responding agency. The responding agency contacted depends, in part, on the location. Examples of responding agencies would be military Search and Rescue, Coast Guard, local police, voluntary Search and Rescue.

Typical users/purchasers of these devices are participants in activities such as hiking, mountain biking, climbing, boating and flying. They are also useful for those who work in remote areas (loggers, foresters, geologists, fisheries and wildlife staff).

Additional features are increasingly being offered: sending preprogrammed messages, breadcrumb tracking via Google Earth. Some newer devices offer two-way communication via satellite, for example Garmin's inReach Communicator, the Yellowbrick 3 Messenger/Tracker, and the Somewear Global Hotspot.

The considerations when buying them, is ensuring that the International Emergency Response Coordination Centre (IERCC) which receives a distress call maintains an accurate and up-to-date database of response agencies to contact and can quickly determine which is appropriate to the situation/location. The commercial, IERCC is GEOS, used by both SPOT and DeLorme SENDs.

The US Coast Guard's National Search and Rescue Committee (NSARC) set up a working group which includes representation from other US agencies, international organizations and device manufacturers to discuss how these "technologies can be properly reviewed and integrated with the SAR response system in the United States" and to aid the Radio Technical Commission for Maritime Services (RTCM) in "development of a minimum operating and performance specification for such devices". The RTCM working group SC has completed and approved a standard for Emergency Satellite Notification Systems, which was published in August 2011.

== Garmin Device ==
inReach, like SPOT, does not use the 406 MHz signal nor the system of satellites. Instead, it depends on the Iridium satellite constellation. Unlike SPOT, inReach is a two way system capable of receiving confirmation that the message was received. Like SPOT, the message is transmitted to the private Garmin Response//Garmin IERCC(FORMALLY GEOS International Emergency Response Center) who then notifies the appropriate SAR authorities.

inReach also provides tracking capability and two way SMS text messages.

== SPOT ==
SPOT does not use the 406 MHz signal nor the system of satellites. Instead, it depends on the GlobalStar satellite system. It has richer features (for instance, can send many non-emergency signals) – but it does not work in as many places as 406 MHz PLBs – for instance under dense forest canopy or steep canyons. When a user presses the "911" button on a SPOT device an emergency message containing the unit's identification and GPS location is transmitted to the GEOS International Emergency Response Center who then notifies the appropriate emergency agency for the region after first calling the user to ensure the transmission is not accidental.

SPOT additionally has the ability to provide non-emergency web based tracking information. This allows family or friends at home to track the holder's progress. The tracking operates by sending a tracking signal to the GlobalStar network every 10 minutes. This feature can additionally be useful to provide location of an individual even if the individual is unable to activate the emergency '911' button.

== Yellowbrick ==
Yellowbrick, like SPOT, does not use the 406 MHz signal nor the system of satellites. Instead, it depends on the Iridium satellite system. Unlike SPOT, Yellowbrick is a two way system capable of receiving confirmation that the message was received and exchange two-way messages via short emails and SMS. Alert messages are transmitted to destinations specified by the owner.

== See also ==
- Emergency locator beacon
- Emergency position-indicating radiobeacon station, which covers PLB, ELT, EPIRB
