= 3D audio effect =

Class of sound effect

Three-dimensional audio effects (3D audio effects) are a group of sound effects that manipulate the sound produced by stereo speakers, surround-sound speakers, speaker-arrays, or headphones. This frequently involves the virtual placement of sound sources anywhere in three-dimensional space, including behind, above or below the listener.

3D audio (processing) is the spatial domain convolution of sound waves using head-related transfer functions. It is the phenomenon of transforming sound waves (using head-related transfer function or HRTF filters and cross talk cancellation techniques) to mimic natural sounds waves, which emanate from a point in a 3D space. It allows trickery of the brain using the ears and auditory nerves, pretending to place different sounds in different 3D locations upon hearing the sounds, even though the sounds may just be produced from only two speakers (dissimilar to surround sound).

== Complete 3D positional audio ==
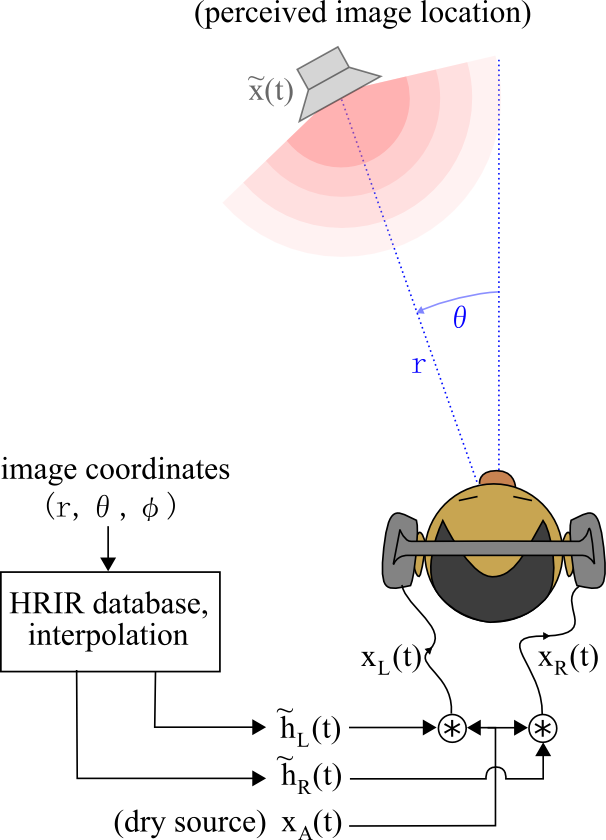
A sound is placed in the horizontal plane by processing the sound with recorded head-related impulse responses.

Using head-related transfer functions and reverberation, the changes of sound on its way from the source (including reflections from walls and floors) to the listener's ear can be simulated. These effects include localization of sound sources behind, above and below the listener.

Some 3D technologies also convert binaural recordings to stereo recordings.

3D Positional Audio effects emerged in the 1990s in PC and video game consoles. 3D audio techniques have also been incorporated in music and video-game style music video arts.

True representation of the elevation level for 3D loudspeaker reproduction become possible by the Ambisonics and wave field synthesis (WFS) principle.

== 3D audio presentations ==
Some amusement parks have created attractions based around the principles of 3D audio. One example is Sounds Dangerous! at Disney's Hollywood Studios at the Walt Disney World Resort in Florida. Guests wear special earphones as they watch a short film starring comedian Drew Carey. At a point in the film, the screen goes dark while a 3D audio sound-track immerses the guests in the ongoing story. To ensure that the effect is heard properly, the earphone covers are color-coded to indicate how they should be worn. This is not a generated effect but a binaural recording.

Nick Cave's novel The Death of Bunny Munro was recorded in audiobook format using 3D audio.

The song "Propeller Seeds" by English artist Imogen Heap was recorded using 3D audio.

There have been developments in using 3D audio for DJ performances including the world's first Dolby Atmos event on 23 January 2016 held at Ministry of Sound, London. The event was a showcase of a 3D audio DJ set performed by Hospital Records owner Tony Colman aka London Elektricity.

Other investigations included the Jago 3D Sound project which is looking at using Ambisonics combined with STEM music containers created and released by Native Instruments in 2015 for 3D nightclub sets.

== Fighter jet aircraft ==
In November 2024 it was announced that the US Air Force had awarded a $9 million contract to Danish defense company Terma A/S, to supply its 3D audio system for the F-16 Fighting Falcon aircraft, with a program of upgrades over the next two years. The system will provide high-fidelity digital audio by spatially separating radio signals, aligning audio with threat directions, and integrating active noise reduction.

== See also ==
- AMD TrueAudio – AMD's application-specific integrated circuit
- Ambiophonics – Surround sound technology
- Ambisonics – Full-sphere surround sound format
- Binaural recording – Method of recording sound
- Crossfeed – Blending of right and left channels in stereo audio recordings
- Sound spatialization – Composed music that intentionally exploits sound localization
- Spatial computing – Computing paradigm emphasizing 3D spatial interaction with technology
- Surround sound – System with loudspeakers that surround the listener
- Wave field synthesis – Technique for creating virtual acoustic environments
- Nokia OZO – Audio software technology – Technology to capture and reproduce 360-degree sound
