= Pixel (1st generation) =

2016 Android smartphone designed by Google

Pixel Pixel XL
- Diagrams of the Pixel and Pixel XL
- Developer: Google
- Manufacturer: HTC
- Type: Pixel: Smartphone; Pixel XL: Phablet
- Series: Pixel
- First released: October 20, 2016; 9 years ago
- Availability by region: October 4, 2016: Australia; Canada; Germany; United Kingdom; United States; October 13, 2016: India
- Discontinued: April 11, 2018
- Units sold: 3.35 million (as of Oct. 2022)
- Predecessor: Nexus 5X; Nexus 6P
- Successor: Pixel 2
- Form factor: Slate
- Dimensions: Pixel: H: 143.8 mm (5.66 in); W: 69.5 mm (2.74 in); D: 8.5 mm (0.33 in); Pixel XL: H: 154.7 mm (6.09 in); W: 75.7 mm (2.98 in); D: 8.5 mm (0.33 in)
- Weight: Pixel: 143 g (5.04 oz); Pixel XL: 168 g (5.93 oz)
- Operating system: Original: Android 7.1 "Nougat"; Last: Android 10
- System-on-chip: Qualcomm Snapdragon 821
- CPU: Quad-core (2 × 2.15 GHz & 2 × 1.6 GHz) Kryo 64-bit ARMv8-A cores
- GPU: Adreno 530
- Memory: 4 GB LPDDR4 RAM
- Storage: 32 GB or 128 GB, UFS 2.0
- Battery: Pixel: 2,770 mAh; Pixel XL: 3,450 mAh
- Rear camera: 12.3 MP Sony Exmor IMX378 1.55 μm pixel size with f/2.0 aperture, phase-detection Autofocus + Laser Autofocus, HDR+ Processing, Night Sight, HD 720p (up to 240 FPS), FHD 1080p video (up to 120 FPS), 4K 2160p video (up to 30 FPS), Electronic Image Stabilization (sampling gyroscope at 200 Hz)
- Front camera: 8 MP Sony Exmor IMX179 1.4 μm pixel size with f/2.4 aperture, FHD 1080p video (up to 30 FPS)
- Display: Pixel: 5.0 in (127 mm) FHD AMOLED, 1920 × 1080 (441 ppi); Pixel XL: 5.5 in (140 mm) QHD AMOLED, 2560 × 1440 (534 ppi); All models: 2.5D Corning Gorilla Glass 4; 100% NTSC Color Space; 100,000:1 contrast ratio 24 bit/px depth, 16.78 million colours
- Sound: Loudspeaker, 3.5mm jack
- Connectivity: GSM, LTE, LTE Advanced, Voice over LTE, HSDPA, CDMA
- Model: Pixel: G-2PW4100 (North America); G-2PW4200 (International); Pixel XL: G-2PW2100 (North America); G-2PW2200 (International)
- Codename: Sailfish (Pixel); Marlin (Pixel XL)
- Other: IP53, proximity/ALS, accelerometer+Gyrometer, magnetometer, Pixel Imprint (fingerprint sensor), barometer, Hall effect sensor, Android Sensor Hub

The Pixel and Pixel XL are a pair of Android-based smartphones designed, developed, and marketed by Google and the first smartphones to be part of the Google Pixel product line, succeeding the Nexus line of smartphones. They were officially announced on October 4, 2016, at the Made by Google event and released in the United States on October 20. On October 4, 2017, they were succeeded by the Pixel 2 and Pixel 2 XL.

The Pixels have an aluminium chassis, with a glass panel on the rear, a USB-C connector, 3.5 mm headphone jack, and a 12.3 megapixel rear-facing camera. At launch, the devices featured certain exclusive software features, including the 7.1 "Nougat" update to the Android operating system, integration with the Google Assistant intelligent personal assistant, live technical support services, and unlimited full-resolution Google Photos backup for the life of the device.

The Pixels received mixed reviews, with praise for the devices' performance and cameras, but several critics noted similarities with Apple's iPhone line in terms of hardware design, and criticized the Pixels's lack of waterproofing and high price.

== History ==
Google previously co-developed flagship Android devices with original equipment manufacturers through the Nexus program, which were designed to be "reference" devices for the Android platform, but the devices retained similarities to other devices made by their respective partners. Rick Osterloh, former president of Motorola, joined Google as its senior vice president of hardware in April 2016, and Google initiated development of an ecosystem of in-house products and platforms, including the Google Home smart speaker, Google Assistant intelligent personal assistant, and Google Daydream, Google's virtual reality platform. The Pixels were announced on October 4, 2016, and serve as Google's launch devices for Android 7.1 "Nougat".

Osterloh said in an interview with The Verge that "a lot of the innovation that we want to do now ends up requiring controlling the end-to-end user experience". The Verge wrote that the Nexus program had "fulfilled its mission", with a Google spokesperson stating that there are "no plans" to make another Nexus device. The Pixel was designed by and marketed as a Google product. Google worked with HTC on a contract basis on development but have said that the Pixels are not based on any existing HTC device. It offered Huawei the contract to manufacture the devices, but after Google refused to dual-brand the phone with credit to the manufacturer, Huawei declined the offer.

In the United States, Pixel was exclusive to Verizon Wireless and Project Fi (now Google Fi Wireless), but also available direct-to-consumer via Google's online store or from Best Buy. In the United Kingdom, they are available direct-to-consumer via Google's online store, and through EE and Carphone Warehouse. In India, they became available for preorder from October 13 from Flipkart, Reliance Digital, and Cromā, with general store availability on October 25.

On October 4, 2017, Google announced the Pixel 2 and Pixel 2 XL smartphones, succeeding the original Pixel devices. The Pixel and Pixel XL were removed from the Google Store and discontinued on April 11, 2018.

== Specifications ==
=== Hardware ===
==== Exterior ====
Pixel uses an aluminium chassis, with a glass panel on the portion of the rear housing the camera and "Pixel Imprint" fingerprint sensor.

The phones have a USB-C connector supporting USB 3.0, for power and data exchange. The phone features a 3.5 mm headphone jack, which received media attention for being a contrast to competing smartphone Apple iPhone 7, the first not to feature the port.

The Pixel and Pixel XL both use the Qualcomm Snapdragon 821 system-on-chip, with 4 GB of RAM. They are offered with either 32 GB or 128 GB of UFS 2.0 non-expandable internal storage.

==== Display and battery ====
The two models are differentiated by screen and battery size. The standard Pixel's display measures 5 in (130 mm) 1080p AMOLED with a 2770 mAh battery, while the Pixel XL's display measures 5.5 in (140 mm) 1440p AMOLED with a 3450 mAh battery.

==== Cameras ====
Pixel features a 12.3-megapixel rear-facing camera, which uses an f/2.0 aperture, and a Sony Exmor IMX378 sensor with 1.55 μm pixels.

Lacking optical image stabilization, the camera uses a digital image stabilization system tied to the phone's gyroscope and motion sensors at a sampling rate of 200 Hz.

To improve capture speed, 30 frames are continuously captured per second while the camera is active. When a photo is taken, up to 10 of these frames are composed to form a single image. Later software updates to Pixel introduced "Night Sight", an enhanced low-light photography mode first introduced on one of the devices' successors, the Pixel 3.

=== Software ===
==== Stock Software ====
The Pixel and Pixel XL shipped with Android 7.1 "Nougat", an update to 7.0 that was initially exclusive to the Pixel. Android 7.1 was later released for some existing Nexus devices in December 2016, but certain features remained exclusive to the Pixel.

Pixel supports Google Assistant, and provides live technical support services integrated into the OS. Similarly to Nexus devices, it receives Android updates directly from Google. Pixel also supports the Google Daydream virtual reality platform. Pixels 1–5 included unlimited full-resolution Google Photos backup for the life of the device. A November 2016 update added additional motion gestures, including double-tapping the screen to show alerts, and raising the device to wake the screen.

Google states on its support pages that the Pixel and Pixel XL are guaranteed to receive new Android version updates until October 2018, and guaranteed to receive security patches until October 2019. In August 2017, Google released Android 8.0 "Oreo" for the Pixel and Pixel XL. Android 8.1 Oreo was released for the Pixel and Pixel XL, as well as some other devices, on December 5, 2017. Although after the date Google guaranteed the Pixel and Pixel XL would receive new Android versions, Google released Android 10 to the Pixel and Pixel XL in September 2019. Google released the final official security update to the Pixel and Pixel XL in December 2019.

==== Custom ROMs ====
The Pixel 1st generation series allows bootloader unlocking and custom ROM installs, and as a result the phone can be updated to more recent versions of Android with the degoogled /e/OS, lineageOS or LineageOS with microG.

=== Cellular networks ===
All Pixel and Pixel XL models are multi-band devices.

	Bands																	
Pixel & Pixel XL region version	2G	3G									4G							
Pixel & Pixel XL region version	GSM	CDMA				TD-SCDMA	UMTS				LTE-FDD							LTE-TDD
US, CA, PR	850, 900, 1800, 1900	BC	0	1	10	—N/a	B	1, 2, 4, 5	8		B	1-5, 7, 8, 12, 13, 17	20	25	26, 28	29, 30		B 41
International	850, 900, 1800, 1900	BC	0			B 34, 39	B	1-6	8	9, 19	B	1-5, 7, 8, 12, 13, 17	18-21		26, 28		32	B 38-41

== Reception ==
The Pixel and Pixel XL received mixed reviews. Dieter Bohn of The Verge said the Pixel smartphones are "...easily the best Android phones you can buy" and gave the product a 9 out of 10, praising its long battery life and Google Assistant integration. However, criticism has been aimed at its pedestrian design and lack of waterproofing.

Matt Humrick of AnandTech praised the camera being flush with the body, but was critical of the price, stating that Nexus fans who were looking for a more affordable option would be disappointed. Chris Velazco of Engadget praised the build quality, camera, and performance, but criticized the high price, and lack of proper water-resistance present in rivals, such as the iPhone 7 and the Samsung Galaxy S7.

Writing for Ars Technica, Ron Amadeo said of the phone, "[it has] unbeatable software and support with a great camera, wrapped in a familiar exterior." Zach Epstein of BGR wrote in February 2017 that "There’s also no question that the phones feature a design that is sleek and impressive, yet all too familiar. Yes, that’s a nice way of saying that Google blatantly ripped off the iconic design that Apple has used on its iPhones for the past three generations."

== Sales ==
In June 2017, Ars Technica reported that Google Play's app for the Pixel Launcher, an app pre-installed on all Pixel phones, had been downloaded between one million and five million times. Although the report acknowledged the measurement's imprecision, the publication credited it for providing the first possible sales numbers. In February 2018, an analysis by International Data Corporation (IDC) reported that Google shipped a combined 3.9 million Pixel/XL and Pixel 2/2XL phones in 2017, almost double the number of shipments from 2016, when Google shipped nearly 2 million Pixel and Pixel XL phones in three months.

== Issues ==
The Pixel and Pixel XL have exhibited numerous problems since release, including:

- Rear camera producing excessive flare (fixed in an update to Google's Camera app)
- Bluetooth pairing and stability problems, (fixed through an update to Google's servers in March 2017)
- Connectivity problems with an LTE band (fixed with the release of Android 7.1.1 in December 2016)
- "Bubbles" forming under the phone's display (with Google replacing affected units and launching an investigation into the issue)
- Audio distortion and harsh clipping at maximum volume through the phone's speaker (fixed in a February 2017 system update, and later also addressed in the Android 7.1.2 system update)
- Random software freezes that leave the phone unresponsive for a few minutes (fixed with the June 2017 monthly security patch)
- Unexpected battery shutdowns (with Android 7.1.2 fixing the issue)
- Synchronization issues with Apple MacBook computers, reportedly due to an outdated synchronization program that Google had not updated since 2012.
- Failing microphones, as a result of a "hairline crack in the solder connection on the audio codec", with Google announcing a replacement program
- Issues with properly backing up the devices, with failures of SMS, call history, and apps. Google is reportedly looking into the issue.

== See also ==
- Google Nexus
- List of Google Play edition devices
