= Nexus 5X =

Android smartphone manufactured by LG Electronics

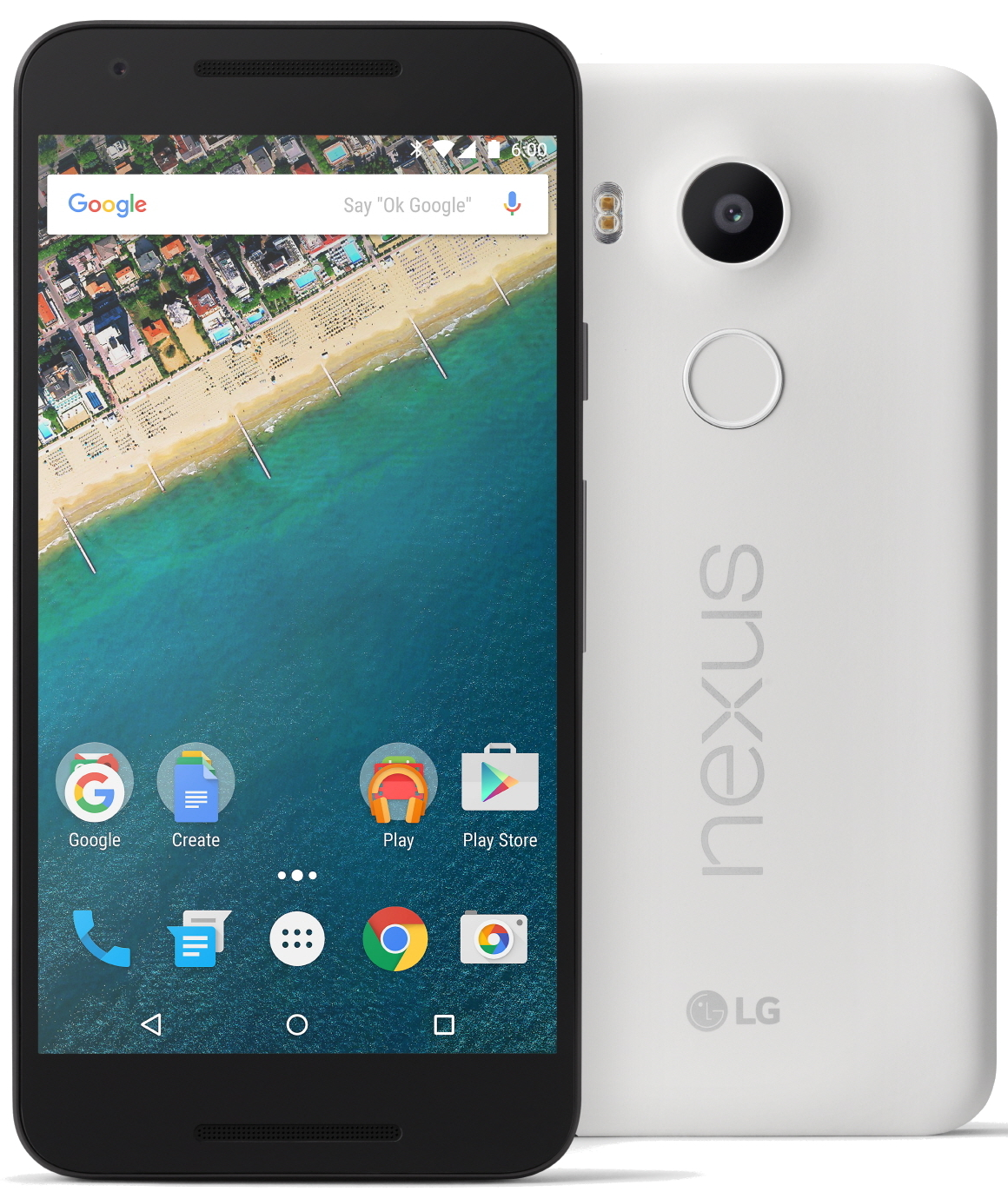
- Front and back view of the Nexus 5X
- Developer: Google, LG Electronics
- Manufacturer: LG Electronics
- Type: Smartphone
- Series: Google Nexus
- First released: October 22, 2015; 11 years ago
- Availability by region: September 29, 2015: Japan; United Kingdom; United States; Ireland; Canada; South Korea; October 13, 2015: India; November 2, 2015: Hong Kong; European Union; November 3, 2015: Australia; November 21, 2015: Russia; November 23, 2015: Taiwan
- Discontinued: October 4, 2016
- Predecessor: Nexus 5
- Successor: Pixel
- Related: Nexus 6P; LG G4
- Compatible networks: List: 2G/3G/4G LTE GSM/EDGE: 850/900/1800/1900 MHz North American model (LG-H790): UMTS/WCDMA bands: 1/2/4/5/8 CDMA band class: 0/1/10 LTE (FDD) bands: 1/2/3/4/5/7/12/13/17/20/25/26/29 LTE (TDD) bands: 41 LTE CA DL: B2-B2, B2-B4, B2-B5, B2-B12, B2-B13, B2-B17, B2-B29, B4-B4, B4-B5, B4-B7, B4-B12, B4-B13, B4-B17, B4-B29, B41-B41 International model (LG-H791): UMTS/WCDMA bands: 1/2/4/5/6/8/9/19 LTE (FDD) bands: 1/2/3/4/5/7/8/9/17/18/19/20/26/28 LTE (TDD) bands: 38/40/41 LTE CA DL: B1-B3, B1-B5, B1-B7, B1-B8, B1-B18, B1-B19, B1-B26, B3-B3, B3-B5, B3-B7, B3-B8, B3-B19, B3-B20, B3-B28, B5-B7, B7-B7, B7-B20, B7-B28, B40-B40, B41-B41 Hong Kong model (LG-H798): UMTS/WCDMA bands: 1/2/5/8 LTE (FDD) bands: 1/3/7/8/26 LTE (TDD) bands: 38/40/41 LTE CA DL: B1-B3, B3-B3, B3-B7, B3-B8, B39-B41, B41C-B41C
- Dimensions: 147.0 mm (5.79 in) H 72.6 mm (2.86 in) W 7.9 mm (0.31 in) D
- Weight: 136 g (4.80 oz)
- Operating system: Original: Android 6.0 "Marshmallow"; Last: Android 8.1 "Oreo"
- System-on-chip: Qualcomm Snapdragon 808
- CPU: 1.8 GHz hexa core (4×1.4 GHz Cortex-A53 + 2×1.8 GHz Cortex-A57) 64-bit ARMv8-A
- GPU: Adreno 418
- Memory: 2 GB LPDDR3 RAM
- Storage: 16 GB or 32 GB
- Battery: 2,700 mAh Li-Po 100 min charge, 6 h 25 min use non-replaceable
- Rear camera: 12.3 MP, f/2.0 aperture, 1/2.3" sensor size, 1.55 μm pixel size, dual LED flash, IR laser-assisted autofocus, Sony Exmor IMX377
- Front camera: 5 MP, 1.4 μm pixel size, f/2.0 aperture Omnivision OV5693
- Display: 5.2 in (130 mm), 1920 × 1080 pixel resolution (423 ppi); 1080p Full HD, IPS LCD panel with Corning Gorilla Glass 3
- Model: LG-H790 (North America); LG-H791 (International); LG-H791F (unknown); LG-H798 (Hong Kong)
- Codename: Bullhead
- SAR: H790 model (US version) 1.25 W/kg for ear use, 1.28 W/kg body.; H791 model (EU version) 0.564 W/kg for ear use, 0.696 W/kg body.
- Other: Proximity; Accelerometer+gyrometer; Magnetometer; Fingerprint sensor Barometer; Hall effect sensor
- Website: www.google.com/nexus/5x

The Nexus 5X (codenamed bullhead) is an Android smartphone manufactured by LG Electronics, co-developed with and marketed by Google as part of its Nexus line of flagship devices. Unveiled on September 29, 2015, it was a successor to the Nexus 5. The phone, along with the Nexus 6P, served as launch devices for Android 6.0 Marshmallow, which introduced a refreshed interface, performance improvements, increased Google Now integration, and other new features.

Reviewers widely praised the phone on release, although many devices later began experiencing spontaneous unrecoverable bootloops.

On October 4, 2016, Google presented its successor, the Google Pixel; the same day, the Nexus 5X was discontinued and removed from the Google Store.

== Specifications ==
=== Hardware ===
The device has a fingerprint sensor on the back called 'Nexus Imprint' which can be used by third-party apps.

The phone was compatible with Project Fi, Google's own mobile network.

To save power, Google has introduced what it calls an 'Android Sensor Hub'. It is a secondary low-power processor whose purpose is to run activity-recognition algorithms by directly monitoring the device's accelerometer, gyroscope, fingerprint reader, and camera sensors, allowing the main CPU to remain inactive until something requires its attention. The Sensor Hub recognizes when the device has been picked up and will automatically display notifications in a low-power white-on-black text until the screen has been properly activated. Additionally, the Sensor Hub stack also supports hardware sensor batching, a feature introduced in KitKat that permits sensors to delay for a short period of time the handoff of non-critical data to the operating system – as opposed to sending a constant stream of data to the CPU, which results in the use of more power. Sensor batching has been used in step counters to avoid requiring the main processor to constantly remain awake for each step to be measured.

The Nexus 5X houses a 12.3 megapixel (1.55 μm pixels) f/2.0 aperture Sony IMX377EQH5 rear camera which is assisted by laser autofocus and dual LED flash. It can record 4K UHD videos at 30 FPS and slow motion videos at 120 FPS. It also has a 5 megapixel Omnivision OV5693 front camera. Although the rear camera hardware is the same as the Nexus 6P, the Nexus 5X lacks a burst mode and slow-mo video is limited to 120 fps at 720p resolution.

The Nexus 5X and 6P were among the first phones to use a USB-C connector instead of the previously standard Micro-USB connector. However, despite the Type-C connector, the USB port will only transfer data at USB 2.0 speeds (480 Mbit/s), and not USB 3.0 speeds (5.0 Gbit/s). Also, video is not available on this port, so Type-C-to-HDMI adapters will not work. However, USB On-The-Go is supported. Google and LG also made USB Type-C 'Rapid Charging' compatible with the device, claiming up to 4 hours of use in 10 minutes.

iFixIt has assessed the Nexus 5X as easy to repair, the only issues being the lack of a removable battery and a display fused with the front glass.

=== Software ===
The phone originally came with Android 6.0 Marshmallow, which includes "Now On Tap", "Doze" battery saving feature, detailed control of app permissions, and support for Google "Imprint" fingerprint sensor.

In December 2015, Google released Android 6.0.1 Marshmallow for the Nexus 5X, among other devices.

On August 22, 2016, Google released Android 7.0 Nougat for the Nexus 5X, as well as several other devices.

Google released Android 7.1.1 Nougat for the Nexus 5X (among other devices) in December 2016. Among other changes, this update brought some features to the Nexus 5X that had been previously exclusive to the Pixel and Pixel XL phones.

On August 21, 2017, Google released Android 8.0 Oreo for the Nexus 5X. Android 8.1 Oreo was released for the Nexus 5X, as well as some other devices, on December 5, 2017. The device received its last security patch in December 2018.

=== Design ===
Color choices include Carbon, Quartz, and Ice. The body is a hard plastic with the proximity sensor, light sensor, voice speaker on top of the display and audio speaker below the display, RGB LED notification light under the audio speaker, and front-facing camera on the front of the device. The back of the device includes a 12.3 megapixel camera, Google "Imprint" fingerprint sensor, dual tone flash, and LG's laser auto focus. One side of the device contains the nano-SIM slot and the other includes the power button, and volume buttons. Microphones are on top and bottom of the device.

== Reception ==
Ars Technica termed the Nexus 5X and Nexus 6P as "the true flagships of the Android ecosystem" and noted the "few to no compromises"; with further praise for the 6P for being only slightly more expensive than the 5X while having a more premium metal body and higher specs. The Verge criticized the Nexus 5X's specifications as its "Snapdragon 808 processor and 2GB of RAM aren't up to pace with the most powerful phones in 2015", implying that it would not age as well as the more powerful Nexus 6P.

== Problems ==
Some Nexus 5Xs in early batches had yellow-tinted screens, which Google replaced.

Some users reported that the display has touch-sensitivity problems when the charger is connected.

Many users reported spontaneous, unrecoverable bootloops, which were related to a hardware issue. LG settled a bootloop lawsuit and agreed to extend the warranty to 30 months from the date of purchase. LG also agreed to repair this issue for free.

Bootlooped phones may frequently be recovered by using an electronics-grade hot air tool to heat the main SOC to solder reflow temperature; implying the issue is a problem with thermal cycling causing the chip's BGA connections to eventually fracture (a problem occurring in several consumer devices including the Xbox 360 and some NVidia GPUs in laptops).

== See also ==
- Comparison of Google Nexus smartphones
