= Robotics lab =

Robotics lab can refer to:

- Distributed Robotics Lab
- Marquette University Humanoid Engineering & Intelligent Robotics Lab
- Mobile Robotics Lab (GCDSL/MRL)
- NETES Institute of Technology and Science Mirza Robotics Lab
- RobotLAB, an American company
