= LG smartphone bootloop issues =

Discovered manufacturing defects on 2015-2016 smartphones made by LG Electronics

Several smartphone models introduced by LG Electronics between 2015 and 2016 were discovered by users to have manufacturing defects, all of which eventually cause the devices to become unstable, or suffer from a bootloop, rendering them effectively inoperable. The LG G4 (2015) has been the most synonymous with these failures, with LG stating that the issues were the result of a "loose contact between components". Similar issues have also been reported to a smaller extent with the G4's successors and sister models, including the Nexus 5X, LG V10 and LG G Flex 2. In March 2017, a class-action lawsuit was filed against LG in regards to their handling of these hardware failures.

When officially acknowledging the bootloop issues with the G4, LG stated that it was caused by a "loose contact between components"; Android Authority explained that "a loose connection between power supply or memory components could certainly cause a phone to fail to boot up properly, due to a lack of system stability or not being able to access vital memory. It's also possible that a faulty connection to other components, such as the camera or fingerprint scanner, could cause a similar problem. This could be down to important setup communications not being sent or received between peripherals correctly."

== Affected devices ==
=== LG G4 ===
Early reports of "bootloop" issues with the LG G4 occurred on forums such as Reddit as early as September 2015; LG was initially inconsistent in accepting warranty claims on affected devices, leading some users to go through their respective wireless carrier instead. A petition was issued calling upon LG to acknowledge the bootloop issues.

In January 2016, LG officially acknowledged that some G4 models suffered from a manufacturing issue "resulting from a loose contact between components", that caused them to experience symptoms such as failure to reboot. Andrew Williams in Trusted Reviews was more specific, saying that "the cause of the problem has been confirmed as a fault in the soldering of one of the connectors on the device's main board". LG stated that it was not known how many devices were affected by the defect, as when or whether it occurs depended on "usage behavior". LG said that users with booting issues should contact the local carrier where the G4 was purchased or a nearby LG Service Center for repair under warranty. Purchasers of G4 devices from non-carrier retailers should contact an LG Service Center "with the understanding that warranty conditions will differ". LG apologized "for the inconvenience caused to some of our customers who initially received incorrect diagnoses".

=== Nexus 5X ===
In September 2016, reports began to circulate that similar failures were being encountered with the Nexus 5X manufactured for Google by LG, particularly whilst upgrading to Android 7.0 "Nougat". Google stated that this was a hardware issue, and that it only impacted a small number of users. LG later stated that it would provide full refunds for affected devices, as the Nexus 5X was reaching the conclusion of its production run.

=== LG V10 and V20 ===
The LG V10's hardware is very similar to that of the G4; it was identified in a class-action lawsuit as suffering from nearly identical forms of hardware failure to the G4.

In response to reports that a model of its successor, the LG V20, experienced a similar bootloop issue, LG claimed that the failure had been caused by the usage of a non-compliant third-party USB-C cable.

=== LG G3 and G5 ===
To a lesser extent, reports of bootloop issues occurring with the G4's predecessor and successor, the G3 and G5, have also been reported by users. However, they have not occurred to the same extent as the G4, and LG has not acknowledged any hardware defects with those models.

=== LG G7 ThinQ ===
On December 1, 2018, all of the European LG G710EM models using a T-Mobile or T-Mobile-based SIM card began suffering from a bootlooping issue. A fix was released with Firmware Version V10p.

== Lawsuit ==
In March 2017, a U.S. lawsuit was filed against LG Electronics in the state of California for unjust enrichment, unfair trade practices, and warranty law violations, seeking damages and for LG to repair all affected G4 and V10 devices. The lawsuit claimed that LG continued to produce and distribute LG G4 and V10 smartphones with the defect, even after it acknowledged the issue, and claimed that LG failed to recall or "offer an adequate remedy to consumers" who bought the two models, nor provide any remedy for devices that fell outside of the one-year warranty period. A party to the suit claimed that LG had issued them multiple warranty replacement phones that eventually suffered from the same hardware failure. The lawsuit was expanded the following month to include the G5, Nexus 5X, and V20. The lawsuit was never certified as a class action, and was sent to arbitration. In January 2018, LG agreed to pay the participants in the lawsuit a $700 credit towards the purchase of a LG smartphone or $425. Since the lawsuit was not certified as a class action, consumers not actually participating in the lawsuit do not get this payment.

In January 2018, due to stock shortages, Google's wireless network Project Fi began to offer the Moto X4 as an alternative replacement for bootloop affected Nexus 5X owners.

== See also ==
- Touch disease, a similar form of eventual hardware failure experienced by the iPhone 6 Plus.
