= Pixel 2 =

2017 Android smartphone designed by Google

Pixel 2 Pixel 2 XL

- Diagrams of the Pixel 2 (L) and Pixel 2 XL (R)
- Developer: Google
- Type: Smartphone
- Series: Pixel
- First released: October 19, 2017
- Discontinued: April 1, 2019
- Units sold: 4.07 million (as of Oct. 2022)
- Predecessor: Pixel
- Successor: Pixel 3
- Compatible networks: 2G, 3G, 4G, LTE
- Form factor: Slate
- Dimensions: Pixel 2: 145.7×69.7×7.8 mm (5.74×2.74×0.31 in); Pixel 2 XL: 157.9×76.7×7.9 mm (6.22×3.02×0.31 in)
- Weight: Pixel 2: 143 g (5.04 oz); Pixel 2 XL: 175 g (6.17 oz)
- Operating system: Original: Android 8.0 "Oreo"; Last: Android 11
- System-on-chip: Qualcomm Snapdragon 835
- CPU: Octa-core (4 × 2.35 GHz, 4 × 1.9 GHz) Kryo
- GPU: Adreno 540
- Memory: 4 GB LPDDR4X RAM
- Storage: 64 or 128 GB
- Battery: Pixel 2: 2,700 mAh; Pixel 2 XL: 3,520 mAh
- Rear camera: Sony Exmor IMX362; 12.2 MP; 1.4 μm pixel size; f/1.8 aperture; Phase-detection autofocus and laser autofocus; HDR+ processing; Night Sight; Dual pixel; HD 720p (up to 240 FPS); FHD 1080p video (up to 120 FPS); 4K 2160p video (up to 30 FPS); EIS; OIS
- Front camera: 8 MP; Sony Exmor IMX179; 1.4 μm pixel size f/2.4 aperture
- Display: Pixel 2: 5 in (127 mm) FHD AMOLED, 1920 × 1080 (441 ppi); Pixel 2 XL: 6 in (152 mm) QHD P-OLED, 2880 × 1440 (538 ppi); All: Gorilla Glass 5
- Sound: Loudspeaker with stereo speakers
- Connectivity: GSM, LTE, LTE Advanced, Voice over LTE, HSDPA, CDMA, TD-LTE, TD-SCDMA
- Water resistance: IP67
- Website: store.google.com/product/pixel_2

The Pixel 2 and Pixel 2 XL are a pair of Android-based smartphones designed, developed, and marketed by Google as part of the Google Pixel product line. They collectively serve as the successors to the Pixel and Pixel XL.

They were officially announced on October 4, 2017 at the Made by Google event and released in the United States on October 19. They were succeeded by the Pixel 3 and Pixel 3 XL on October 9, 2018. Both models reached their planned end-of-life date in October 2020; their final security update was released in December 2020.

== History ==
In early March 2017, Google's Rick Osterloh confirmed that they would bring a "next-gen" Pixel smartphone later that year. He stated it would "stay premium" and that there would be no "cheap Pixel".

Google originally intended to use HTC to manufacture both their 2017 flagships, but later shifted to LG to manufacture the bigger Pixel 2 XL. The unreleased device that was supposed to be the Pixel 2 XL under the codename "Muskie", was later re-developed by HTC into the HTC U11+.

The Google Pixel 2 and Pixel 2 XL were carried in the United States by Verizon and Project Fi. On October 4, 2018, Verizon stopped selling the Pixel 2.

== Specifications ==
=== Design ===
The back of the Pixel 2 and Pixel 2 XL are made from aluminum with a thin "premium coating" of plastic and has a top section made from glass to provide wireless transmissivity. Unlike the original Pixel XL, which was simply an enlarged version of the Pixel design with no other changes, the Pixel 2 XL's external design differs from its smaller sibling, employing a taller 2:1 P-OLED display (marketed as 18:9) instead of the Pixel 2's 16:9 AMOLED.

=== Hardware ===
The Pixel 2 and Pixel 2 XL are both powered by the Qualcomm Snapdragon 835, coupled with 4 GB LPDDR4X RAM. They both come in storage options of 64 or 128 GB.

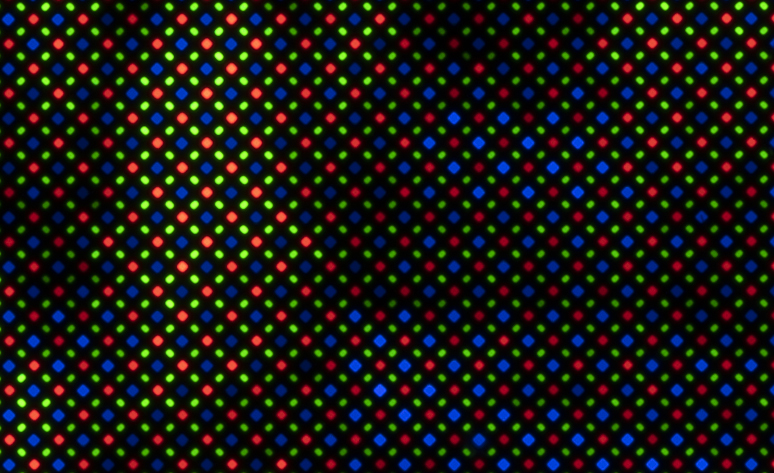
Magnified view showing the diagonal PenTile pixel arrangement on the Pixel 2 (not XL)

The Pixel 2 has a 5-inch (130 mm) 16:9 1080p (1920 × 1080) AMOLED display panel with a pixel density of 441 ppi, while the Pixel 2 XL comes with a 6-inch (150 mm) 2:1 1440p (2880 × 1440) P-OLED display panel with a pixel density of 538 ppi.

Both phones have a 12.2 megapixel rear camera capable of recording 4K video at 30 FPS, 1080p video at 120 FPS, and 720p video at 240 FPS. The camera also contains phase-detection autofocus, laser autofocus, and HDR+ processing. The Pixel 2 and Pixel 2 XL also include the Pixel Visual Core (PVC) image processor for faster and lower power image processing, though it was not enabled until Android 8.1 was released in January 2018. The PVC was custom design by Google's consumer hardware team with collaboration from Intel. The Pixels do not have support for 4K video at 60 FPS, as the processor is not powerful enough. The Pixel 2 includes optical image stabilization which the Pixel lacked. Google uses Fused Video Stabilization which reduces issues with camera shake, motion blur, rolling shutter distortion, and focus breathing as found in other image stabilization methods.

The Pixel 2 and Pixel 2 XL support USB Power Delivery quick charging, have a fingerprint sensor on the rear, IP67 dust and water resistance and are Daydream-ready. The Pixel 2s has a nano-SIM and an eSIM, Android Q Beta 2 enabled dual SIM support however Android Q Beta 3 disabled it.

=== Software ===
The phones ship with stock Android 8.0 "Oreo" on launch. Google has promised three years of software and security updates, making it closer to the average four years of support that Apple provides for its iPhones. The Sony Xperia XZ1 was the first phone to ship with Android 8.0 ("Oreo").

The new Pixels also include a feature called "Active Edge". With this, the Google Assistant can be launched by squeezing the phone's sides, similar to the HTC U11's "Edge Sense" feature.

This phone was also released with the new Google Lens app, which is designed to bring up relevant information using visual analysis by the camera. The "Now Playing" feature allows the device to automatically detect music through its microphone, and identify the song on the lock screen.

On December 5, 2017, Android 8.1 Oreo was released for the Pixel 2 and Pixel 2 XL.

On October 4, 2017, the Pixel 2 and Pixel 2 XL were granted an extended warranty period which guarantees Android version updates for them until October 2020, 3 years from when they were first available on the Google Store, and free unlimited storage for all photos and videos taken on the phone in original quality through the end of 2020, with unlimited high-quality storage continuing afterwards.

Android 9.0 "Pie" was made available upon its launch on August 6, 2018. Following the release of the Pixel 3, some of its features were backported to the Pixel 2, including updates to the camera software, augmented reality stickers, and a history log for "Now Playing", among others. Android 10 was made available upon its launch on September 3, 2019. Similarly, Android 11 was made available to download upon its launch on September 8, 2020.

In October 2020, the Pixel 2 and Pixel 2 XL reached their planned end-of-life date. Their final security update was released in December 2020. As of July 2024, both are supported by LineageOS.

=== Cellular networks ===
Generation	Standard	Bands
2G	GSM	850, 900, 1800, 1900
3G	CDMA EVDO Rev A	BC 0, 1, 10
3G	UMTS / HSPA+ / HSDPA	1, 2, 3, 4, 8
4G	LTE-FDD	1*, 2*, 3*, 4*, 5, 7*, 8, 12, 13, 17, 20, 25, 26, 28, 29, 30, 32, 66*
4G	LTE-TDD	38*, 40, 41

* Bands that support 4x4 MIMO

== Reception ==
The Pixel 2 camera initially received a score of 98 (currently updated to 99) from DxOMark, making it the highest performing mobile device camera at the end of 2017, and was overtaken in March 2018 by Samsung's Galaxy S9+.

The Pixel 2 and the Pixel 2 XL received mixed reviews. The phone was praised for the camera quality and water resistance, but was criticized for the removal of the headphone jack, particularly after Google mocked Apple for doing the same with its iPhone 7 phone at the launch of the first generation Pixel phone just 12 months prior. Google was also criticized for the price of the USB-C to 3.5 mm headphone adapter it sells, which costs US$20 while Apple's Lightning to 3.5 mm adapter costs US$9, as well as for not including headphones with the phone. However, news outlets noted that because USB-C is a standard interface, unlike Lightning, there are a variety of third-party adapters that retail for less than Google's official one. Google later dropped the price of the adapter to US$9, keeping the price in-line with Apple's offering.

YouTuber JerryRigEverything, who performs durability tests on various smartphones, criticized Google for their design choice with the antenna lines on the sides of the handset. When he bent the Pixel 2, it cracked at the antenna line near the middle of the phone, voiding its water resistance and warranty, while most other phones from competitors pass his bend test. This does not apply to the Pixel 2 XL.

The design of the smaller Pixel 2 was regarded as plain, and its big chunky bezels were not well received, considering that earlier 2017 phones like the Samsung Galaxy S8 and LG G6 had moved to nearly bezel-less screens.

The Pixel 2 XL screen became infamous for quality control issues, a flaw shared with the LG V30 which also has the same manufacturer and P-OLED screen type. The Pixel 2 XL has a blue tint visible on the screen when the phone is viewed at an angle. Many were dissatisfied and it was speculated that Google had installed the polarizer incorrectly. However, when Google addressed the tint, they stated that it was a design choice to have the blue tint to go along with the cooler color temperature used by the screen (it is calibrated to a D67 white point, which is 6700K).

The Pixel 2 was updated with the Pixel 3's Night Sight feature which dramatically improves low light performance with no flash or tripod. Using Night Sight the Pixel 2 takes superior low light photos than newer 2018 flagships such as the iPhone XS and Samsung Galaxy Note 9.

== Issues ==
- The Pixel 2 XL's display suffers from a "black smear" problem, which occurs when a group of black pixels transition to colored ones, and tend to linger for a while, before changing to their expected state.
- The Pixel 2 XL has an issue where the screen may flash randomly. It occurs when the phone is locked or unlocked. The issue was fixed in the June 2018 system software update, but returned with the July 2018 update.
- Hundreds of Pixel 2 and Pixel 2 XL owners have complained about buzzing and clicking sounds coming from the phone. Google investigated the issue and recommended turning off NFC to temporarily fix the problem until a software update comes out. The November 2017 security patch fixed the clicking sound, but Google has not fixed the buzzing and rattling sounds heard during calls on some devices.
- The Pixel 2 XL has a volume flaw that reduces the sound level of audio clips sent through messaging apps such as Google Allo, Instagram, and Telegram among others. Google is aware of the problem and is looking into it.
- Some of the USB-C to 3.5mm adapters for the headphones do not work. In some cases, rebooting the phone can fix the issue temporarily. Google is offering replacements for the faulty adapters.
- Multiple users reported that the microphone can randomly stop working. A possible solution is to blow into the microphone.
- Some units suffer from Bluetooth connectivity issues.

=== Fixed issues ===
- Vlad Savov of The Verge has complained of under-saturated and distorted OLED displays, and there have also been reports of screen burn-in on some Pixel 2 XL units. Google conducted an investigation and released a software update in November that added a new mode for more saturated colors and faded out the navigation bar after a period of inactivity. Google also extended device warranty to two years for both devices worldwide.
- There was an issue where Google Assistant does not work with some Bluetooth headphones. This was an issue with the Google app and was patched in version 7.17.
- The Pixel 2 XL had an issue where heavy noise reduction filters distorted audio recordings. This was fixed in the November 2017 security patch.

== Sales ==
In the United States, Verizon and Project Fi are the exclusive carriers for the Pixel 2 and Pixel 2 XL. They are available direct-to-consumer for use on any wireless network through Google's online store, or from Best Buy and Target. According to IDC Senior Research Director Francisco Jeronimo, Google shipped 3.9 million units in 2017, twice as much as Pixels sold in 2016.

On March 21, 2018, Google did a temporary offer where, if a consumer financed a Pixel for 2 years, they would receive a $200 cashback. This aimed to compete with the Samsung Galaxy S9 and iPhone X. The promotion ended March 31, 2018.

On July 9, 2018, Google reduced the price of the Pixel 2 XL by US$100.

On October 12, 2018, The Pixel 2 XL was discounted by $300 for Verizon Wireless customers.

On April 1, 2019, Google stopped selling both the Pixel 2 and Pixel 2XL on the Google Play Store.
