= RobotLAB =

Robot Manufacturer

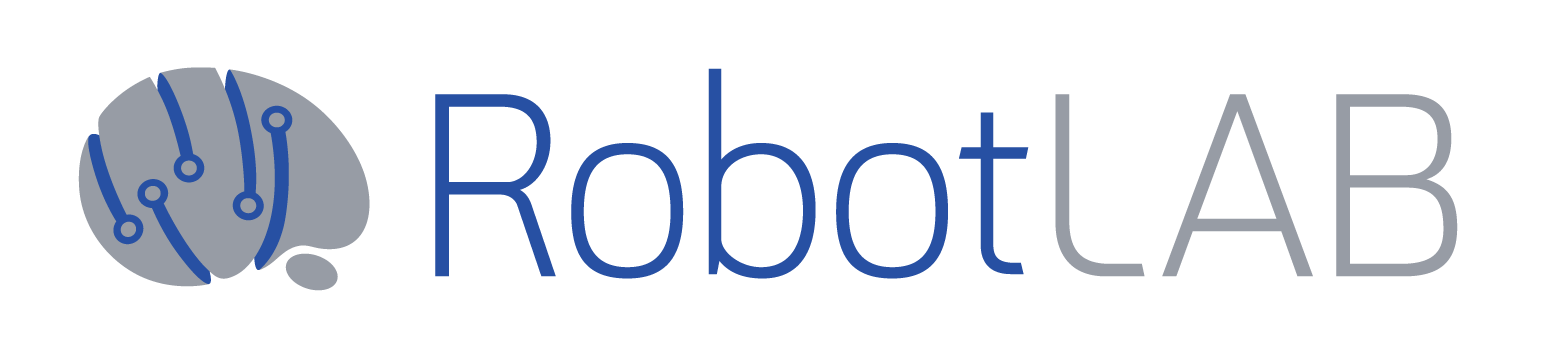
- Trade name: RobotLAB Inc., RobotLAB Group, RobotLAB Corp.
- Industry: Robotics
- Founded: 2007
- Founder: Elad Inbar
- Headquarters: Southlake, Texas
- Products: Cleaning Robots, Delivery Robots, Cooking Robotics, Educational Robotics
- Number of employees: 50-200
- Website: www.robotlab.com

RobotLAB is an American robotics integration company headquartered in Dallas, Texas, specializing in proprietary multi-robot systems and full-service deployment. The company supports K-12 and higher education institutions, along with commercial sectors such as retail, hospitality, and healthcare, as well as public-sector clients including school districts, libraries, and government agencies. RobotLAB also provides service robots such as cleaning robots and delivery robots for commercial and institutional use.

RobotLAB is the only franchised robotics integrator in the United States and operates over 30 locations nationwide. The company is recognized for proprietary multi-robot systems—such as ServeSwift and Robot‑On‑Call—that automate delivery and bussing processes in restaurants and hospitality environments, and for full integration of humanoid robots like Pepper, and NAO including custom programming, training, and support.

RobotLAB is a Google partner and powers Google Expeditions.

== Overview ==
In addition to distributing SoftBank’s Pepper, Nao, and Whiz robots, which can be used as personal assistants and educational tools, RobotLAB also provides educational robots designed for use in K-12 and other classrooms. Their robots are programmed to help instructors teach subjects such as STEM.

In 2020, Google announced their discontinuation of their virtual field trips app Google Expeditions. RobotLAB, as Google's partner for Expeditions, created a substitute in partnership with Avantis. The Google Expeditions alternative was named VR Expeditions 2.0. RobotLAB also provides robots for assistance for use in retail, medical and other types of businesses.

RobotLAB provides hotel robots capable of delivering items to guests, sanitizing rooms, and handling luggage, with LG Electronics serving as the managing entity of its commercial deployment in North America.

== History ==
RobotLAB was founded by Elad Inbar, who is also the CEO of Robot App Store, under the name RobotsLAB in Israel in 2007. The company was originally conceptualized as the educational division of Robot App Store. The company eventually spun off into a separate entity and relocated to San Francisco in 2011 and changed its name to RobotLAB Inc.

The company developed a STEM teaching tool, called the RobotsLAB Box. RobotLAB won Robotic Business Review's Game Changer Award for Education in 2013.

In 2014, RobotLAB released STEM-BOT 3D, a 3D-printed robot that students can assemble and program. in 2014, RobotLAB also won the LAUNCHedu competition from the Bill and Melinda Gates Foundation at the SXSW EDU and Kaplan's EdTech Accelerator award.

In 2016, RobtLAB received the Inc 5000 fastest-growing private company award and also ranked first in educational technology category.

In 2020, RobotLAB released VR Expeditions 2.0, an alternative to Google's Expeditions app and also partnered with Avantis to develop applications for ClassVR, a VR platform designed for use in the classroom.

In 2021, RobotLAB became the distributor of their Pepper, Nao, and Whiz robots. In the same year, the Roanoke County Public Library partnered with RobotLAB to create content and programming for Pepper robots used for library purposes.

RobotLAB also partnered with Curious Technologies, in 2021, to distribute the Elias robot model, which is an artificial intelligence designed for language learning.
In 2023, RobotLAB introduced a franchise model to expand its national footprint, allowing entrepreneurs to open and operate RobotLAB locations across the United States. This model complements the company's organic growth through corporate-owned locations and aims to accelerate scalability.

In June 2025, RobotLAB launched the NAO AI Edition, integrating ChatGPT into its NAO and Pepper robots to enhance natural-language interaction capabilities.

In mid-2025, RobotLAB expanded through the launch of a franchise program led by CEO Elad Inbar. Within 18 months, the initiative had enrolled 36 franchise owners managing nearly 90 territories across the United States.

Under this model, franchisees are granted exclusive territories defined by the number of local businesses such as hotels, restaurants, and schools. They are responsible for sales, demonstrations, deployment, and ongoing service of RobotLAB’s robotics solutions, while also receiving corporate accounts assigned by the national team. The initial investment is reported at approximately US$278,000, which includes a franchise fee of $54,900, equipment, three months of operating expenses, and branded vehicles for onsite demonstrations.

RobotLAB has stated that customer invoices under the program average around $26,000 with gross margins of about 46 percent, while larger contracts have also been reported, including an $855,000 deal with a hotel in Las Vegas. The company emphasizes that franchisees are not required to have technical backgrounds and instead act as local consultants and support providers.
