= Halide (programming language) =

Computer programming language designed for digital image processing

- Paradigms: functional, parallel
- Designed by: Jonathan Ragan-Kelley; Andrew Adams
- Developer: MIT, (with help from Stanford, Google, Adobe)
- First appeared: 2012; 14 years ago
- Typing discipline: static
- Implementation language: C++
- OS: macOS, mainstream Linux distributions, Windows
- License: MIT License
- Website: halide-lang.org

Halide is a computer programming language designed for writing digital image processing code that takes advantage of memory locality, vectorized computation and multi-core central processing units (CPU) and graphics processing units (GPU). Halide is implemented as an internal domain-specific language (DSL) in C++. Halide was announced by MIT in 2012 and released in 2013.

== Purpose ==
The main innovation Halide brings is the separation of the algorithm being implemented from its execution schedule, i.e. code specifying the loop nesting, parallelization, loop unrolling and vector instruction. These two are usually interleaved together and experimenting with changing the schedule requires the programmer to rewrite large portions of the algorithm with every change. With Halide, changing the schedule does not require any changes to the algorithm, allowing the programmer to experiment with scheduling.

== Scheduled blur function ==
The following function defines and sets the schedule for a 3×3 box filter defined as a series of two 3×1 passes, allowing the blur algorithm to remain independent of the execution schedule.

Func blur_3x3(Func input) {
  Func blur_x, blur_y;
  Var x, y, xi, yi;

  // The algorithm - no storage or order
  blur_x(x, y) = (input(x-1, y) + input(x, y) + input(x+1, y))/3;
  blur_y(x, y) = (blur_x(x, y-1) + blur_x(x, y) + blur_x(x, y+1))/3;

  // The schedule - defines order, locality; implies storage
  blur_y.tile(x, y, xi, yi, 256, 32)
        .vectorize(xi, 8).parallel(y);
  blur_x.compute_at(blur_y, x).vectorize(x, 8);

  return blur_y;
}

== Uses and development ==
Halide was developed primarily at MIT's CSAIL lab. Both Google and Adobe have been involved in Halide research. Google uses Halide in Pixel 2's Pixel Visual Core. Adobe Photoshop also uses Halide.

== See also ==
- Cuneiform (programming language)
- Algorithmic skeleton
- Parallel programming model
