= Google Store =

Retail store for Google hardware products

- Industry: Retail
- Founded: March 11, 2015; 11 years ago
- Number of locations: 10 stores (2026)
- Products: Technology
- Brands: Pixel; Nest; Chromecast; Fitbit
- Owner: Google
- Website: store.google.com

Google Store is a hardware retail store operated by Google that sells Google Pixel devices, Google Nest products, Chromecast dongles, Fitbit devices like the Fitbit Air, and accessories such as earbuds, phone cases, chargers, and keyboards. It also sold Google Nexus, Google Daydream, Google Stadia and Google Cardboard devices until their discontinuations. Google Store sells products made by Google or made in collaboration with that company. It was introduced on March 11, 2015, and replaced the Devices section of Google Play as Google's hardware retailer.

Google has experimented with physical locations as well. In October 2016, it opened a pop-up shop in New York City to display its then-recently announced hardware products, and the following month it opened "Google Shops", store-within-a-store locations at select Best Buy stores in Canada.

== Locations ==
=== Online ===
On the Internet, the Google Store replaced the Devices section on the Google Play website.

=== Pop-up stores ===
==== London ====
In March 2015, Google opened a store-within-a-store within a branch of British electrical retailer Currys, at Tottenham Court Road, London. It has since closed.

==== Pop-up showroom ====
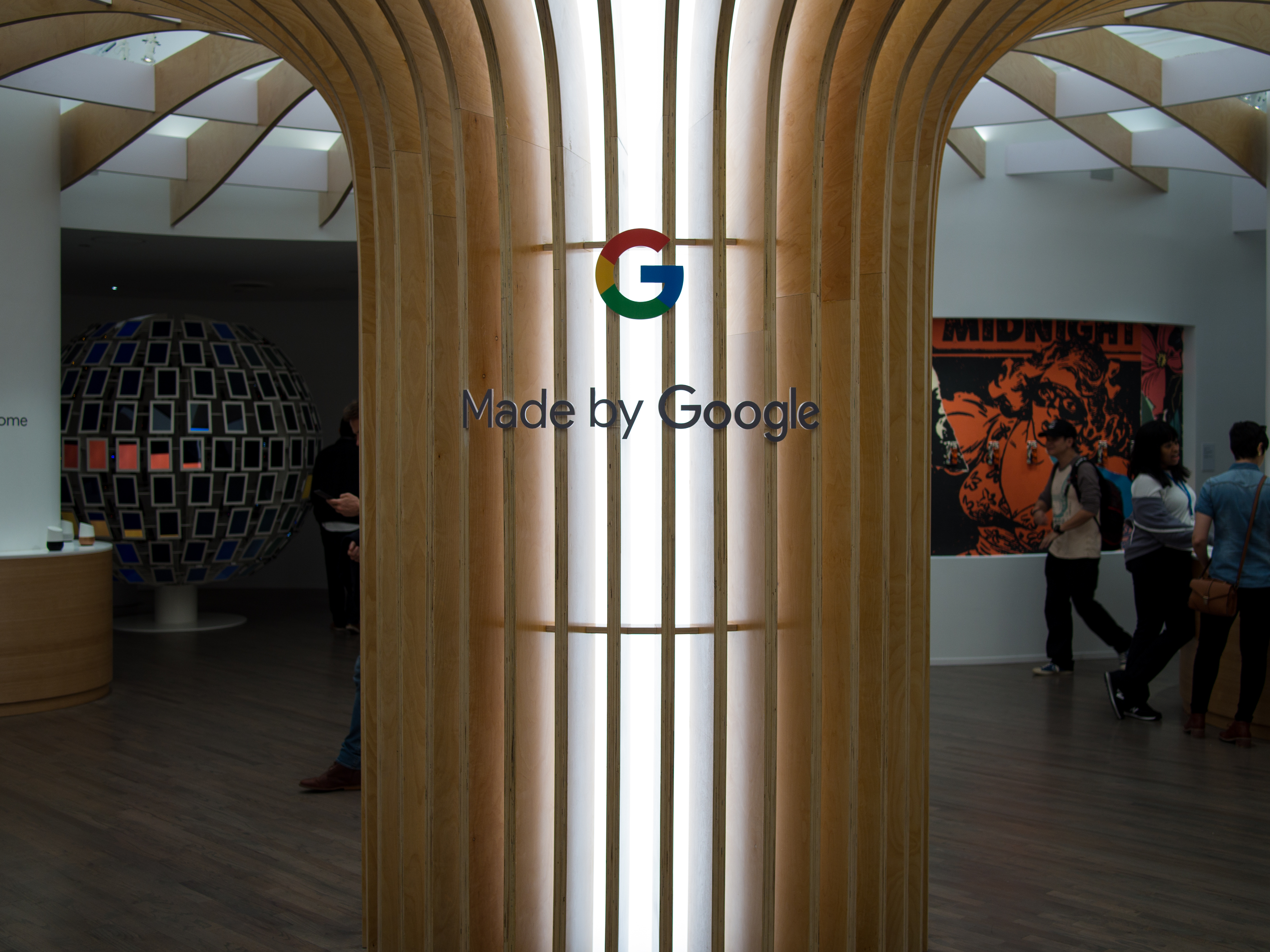
Interior of the Made by Google pop-up showroom in New York City

In October 2016, Google opened Made by Google, a temporary pop-up showroom in the SoHo neighborhood of New York City. The space offered a glimpse at hardware products the company had recently developed, including the Pixel smartphone, Google Home smart speaker, and Daydream View virtual reality headset.

==== Best Buy ====
In November 2016, Google opened "Google Shop", a store-within-a-store where Google displays its hardware products. The Google Shops, available at select Best Buy locations in Canada, gives Google a retail presence that's "been key to building a premium mobile device customer base that’s sizable and loyal, and it’s not something Google has really had with its previous Nexus program". The Shops are "distinctly Google", with visual aesthetics featuring "light wood grain and gray fabric pairing up with playful hints of bright colors", along with "custom-created modular furniture that nests when standing room is limited, but can easily accommodate, say, a small group of students with stool seating in a pinch". In a comment to TechCrunch, Janell Fischer, Google's Director of Retail Marketing, said that "We love it when people can come in, discover, play and have fun and it just happens to be with technology. So we’ve really tried to layer on lots of different immersive sorts of experiences, some that are direct demonstrations of the product and product features, but some that are more exploratory and fun". Each Google Shop "could have unique digital content tailored to the city wherein it resides".

=== Brick-and-mortar ===
As of September 2026, there are 11 physical Google Stores, of which 10 are in the US and 1 in Japan.

==== Chelsea ====
In May 2021, Google announced that it would be opening a physical retail store as part of its Chelsea Market campus in New York City, next to its New York offices. Similar to the Apple Store, the Google Store Chelsea showcases Google's hardware products including Pixel, Nest, Chromecast, Fitbit, and Pixelbook devices, subscription services such as Google Stadia and Google Fi Wireless, software products such as Google Translate and Google Duo, as well as exclusive merchandise. It opened on June 17, 2021.

==== Williamsburg ====
In May 2022, Google announced during the 2022 Google I/O keynote that a second physical Google Store would open in Williamsburg, Brooklyn. It opened on June 16, 2022.

==== Mountain View ====
In September 2023, Google announced that a third physical Google Store would be opened in the new Google Visitor Experience visitor center next to the Googleplex in Mountain View, California, the first Google Store on the West Coast. The store opened alongside the visitor center on October 12, 2023.

The fourth physical Google Store located at 153 Newbury Street in Boston, Massachusetts officially opened in 2024.

A fifth physical Google Store opened on November 1, 2024, at Oakbrook Center in suburban Oak Brook in the Chicagoland area.

Other locations are in Santa Monica in Greater Los Angeles, Austin, Texas, and San Diego since 2025, and in Aventura, Florida and Tokyo since 2026.

== Awards ==
Google Store received the 2016 Webby Award in the Consumer Electronics category.

== See also ==
- Apple Store
- Microsoft Store
