= Pixel 3 =

2018 Android smartphone designed by Google

Pixel 3; Pixel 3 XL

- Diagrams of Pixel 3 (left) and Pixel 3 XL (right)
- Brand: Google
- Manufacturer: Foxconn
- Type: Pixel 3: Smartphone; Pixel 3 XL: Phablet
- Series: Pixel
- First released: October 9, 2018; 7 years ago
- Availability by region: October 18, 2018: United States; November 1, 2018: Australia; Canada; France; Germany; India; Romania; Ireland; Italy; Japan; Singapore; Spain; Taiwan; United Kingdom
- Discontinued: March 31, 2020; 6 years ago
- Units sold: 9.07 million (as of Oct. 2022)
- Predecessor: Pixel 2
- Successor: Pixel 4
- Related: Pixel 3a
- Compatible networks: GSM/EDGE, UMTS/HSPA+, CDMA EVDO Rev A, WCDMA, LTE, LTE Advanced
- Form factor: Slate
- Dimensions: Pixel 3: H: 145.6 mm (5.73 in); W: 68.2 mm (2.69 in); D: 7.9 mm (0.31 in); Pixel 3 XL: H: 158.0 mm (6.22 in); W: 76.7 mm (3.02 in); D: 7.9 mm (0.31 in)
- Weight: Pixel 3: 148 g (5.2 oz); Pixel 3 XL: 184 g (6.5 oz)
- Operating system: Android 9 "Pie"; Last: Android 12
- System-on-chip: Qualcomm Snapdragon 845
- CPU: 2.5 GHz + 1.6 GHz, 64-Bit Octa-Core
- GPU: Adreno 630
- Memory: 4 GB LPDDR4X
- Storage: 64 or 128 GB
- Removable storage: None
- Battery: Pixel 3: 2915 mAh; Pixel 3 XL: 3430 mAh
- Rear camera: Sony Exmor IMX363 12.2 MP (1.4 μm) with f/1.8 lens, Dual Pixel Phase autofocus, optical and electronic image stabilization, spectral + flicker sensor, 1080p at 30/60/120 fps, 720p at 30/60/240 fps, 4K at 30 fps
- Front camera: Sony Exmor IMX355 8 MP with f/1.8 lens and 75° lens, second front camera with 8 MP, f/2.2, fixed focus and 97° wide-angle lens, 1080p at 30 fps, 720p at 30 fps, 480p at 30 fps
- Display: Pixel 3: 5.5 in (140 mm) FHD+ OLED at 443 ppi, 2160 × 1080 pixel resolution (2:1); Pixel 3 XL: 6.3 in (160 mm) QHD+ OLED at 523 ppi, 2960 × 1440 (37:18) pixel resolution Both displays have Corning Gorilla Glass 5 and 424 cd/m^{2} max brightness
- Sound: Front firing stereo speakers
- Connectivity: Wi-Fi 2.4 GHz + 5.0 GHz 802.11a/b/g/n/ac, Bluetooth 5.0 + LE, NFC, GPS (GLONASS, Galileo, BeiDou), eSIM capable
- Data inputs: USB-C
- Water resistance: IP68, up to 1.5 m (4.9 ft) for 30 minutes
- Codename: Blueline (Pixel 3); Crosshatch (Pixel 3 XL)
- Other: 18 W fast charging; Qi wireless charging; Pixel Visual Core; Titan M security module
- Website: Google Pixel 3

The Pixel 3 and Pixel 3 XL are a pair of Android-based smartphones designed, developed, and marketed by Google as part of the Google Pixel product line. They collectively serve as the successors to the Pixel 2 and Pixel 2 XL. They were officially announced on October 9, 2018 at the Made by Google event and released in the United States on October 18. On October 15, 2019, they were succeeded by the Pixel 4 and Pixel 4 XL.

Following diminished sales of the Pixel 3 lineup, on May 7, 2019 Google announced midrange variants at I/O 2019, the Pixel 3a and Pixel 3a XL.

== Specifications ==
=== Design ===
The Pixel 3 and Pixel 3 XL come in three colors: 'Just Black' (all black), 'Clearly White' (white with a mint green power button), and 'Not Pink' (pink, with an orange power button). The Pixel 3's bezels are significantly smaller than its predecessor's. The Pixel 3 XL is the first Pixel device to use a display notch, also able to be "blacked out" in developer options. They both run on Android Pie natively and both have access to Android 12.

=== Hardware ===
The Pixel 3 and Pixel 3 XL come with a Snapdragon 845, Pixel Visual Core (PVC) and 4 GB of RAM; and 64 or 128 GB of internal storage. Both phones feature glass backs and wireless charging, which are firsts for the Pixel range. Google Pixel Stand can wirelessly charge at 10 W, but wireless charging is capped to 5 W when 3rd-party wireless chargers are used. They also feature front-facing stereo speakers and no headphone jack, like the Pixel 2 and Pixel 2 XL. Both phones also use a USB-C connection for charging and connecting other accessories. Both phones also contain Active Edge, where squeezing the sides of the phone activates Google Assistant, which debuted with the Pixel 2 and Pixel 2 XL.

The phones have a water protection rating of IP68 under IEC standard 60529, an improvement from its predecessors water protection rating of IP67. The phones can be submerged in up to 1.5 m of water for up to 30 minutes.

==== Camera ====
The Pixel 3 and Pixel 3 XL have a 12.2 MP rear camera, similar to their predecessors, the Pixel 2 and Pixel 2 XL, but Google Camera has been updated with new photography features, as well as a second wide-angle selfie camera. Some of these features include:

- Night Sight - dramatically improves low light performance with no flash or tripod. Google also updated all past Pixel phones with Night Sight Support.
  - Astrophotography - Google updated the Pixel 3 with an improved Night Sight featuring an astrophotography mode
- Super Res Zoom - employs Super-resolution techniques to increase the resolution beyond what the sensor and lens combination would traditionally achieve using subtle shifts from handheld shake and optical image stabilization (OIS).
- Top Shot - takes a burst of HDR+ photos and automatically picks the best shots. An update added Top Shot for short videos.
- Group Selfie Cam - second front camera which allows for a wide angle shot
- Google Lens - recognizes objects and things seen on the Pixel 3's and Pixel 3 XL's camera
- Computational Raw - outputs DNG+JPG aligning and merging [up to 15] multiple frames to improve dynamic range and reduce noise
- Learning-based Portrait Mode - Portrait Mode now uses a machine-learning-based pipeline for more uniformly defocused backgrounds and fewer depth map errors
- Synthetic Fill Flash - uses machine-learning based segmentation algorithm to add Fill Flash to better light up faces.
- Spectral + flicker sensor - prevents flicker effect under certain indoor lighting such as LED lighting

The Pixel 3 and Pixel 3 XL use a separate chip called the Pixel Visual Core (PVC) to achieve their artificial intelligence camera capabilities. Videos are newly recorded with stereo audio.

=== Software ===
Pixel 3 and Pixel 3 XL ship with Android 9.0 Pie at launch. Both phones got three years of software updates and security updates guaranteed by Google. Android updates ended for the Pixel 3 on October 5, 2021 while the Pixel 3a went on for another year until May 5, 2022. The Google Developers site has flashable factory and OTA (over-the-air) update images up to Android 12.

The Pixel 3 and Pixel 3 XL has been updated bringing several features from the Pixel 4 including: Live captions, Google Recorder, New Google Assistant, Astrophotography mode and Top Shot for short videos.

The Pixel 3 lacks the voice-unlock feature available on previous Pixel devices.

=== Cellular networks ===
Generation	Standard	Bands
2G	GSM	850, 900, 1800, 1900
3G	CDMA EVDO Rev A	BC0, BC1, BC10 (except Japan SKUs)
3G	WCDMA	W1, W2
3G	UMTS / HSPA+ / HSDPA	1, 2, 4, 5, 8
4G	LTE-FDD	1*, 2*, 3*, 4*, 5, 7*, 8, 12, 13, 17, 18, 19, 20, 25*, 26, 28, 29, 32, 66*, 71
4G	LTE-TDD	38*, 39, 40, 41*, 42, 46
4G		* Indicates the bands that support 4x4 MIMO

== Reception ==
Several reviewers, including Dieter Bohn from The Verge, Mark Spoonauer from Tom's Hardware, and Julian Chokkattu from Digital Trends, stated that the Pixel 3's camera was "the best camera you could get on a smartphone." Digital Trends concluded the Pixel 3 XL had the best output, qualitatively, after comparing its camera output with other leading smartphones, including the Apple iPhone XS Max, Samsung Galaxy Note 9, and the Google Pixel 2 XL. American technology reviewer Marques Brownlee in his Smartphone Awards video in December, 2018 said that the Pixel 3 & 3 XL have the best cameras of all smartphones.

Andrei Frumusanu from AnandTech, stated "Google’s Pixels significantly climb up the ladder in terms of low-light photography ranking, even putting themselves at a comfortable distance ahead of the previous low-light champions, Huawei’s 40 MP sensor phones as well as their own night mode."

The Pixel 3 XL was heavily criticized for its notch implementation.

Matt Swider from TechRadar gave both the Pixel 3 & 3 XL 4.5 out of 5 stars, praising the camera and the improved quality of the OLED screen (compared to the Pixel 2 XL's screen, which had many quality control issues), but he criticized the poor battery life of the Pixel 3 and the notch on the Pixel 3 XL, as well as the low amount of RAM, no expandable storage options, and higher pricing compared to the Pixel 2 & 2 XL. Andrew Martonik from Android Central also gave the phones 4.5 out of 5 stars, having similar complaints as Swider.

== Issues ==
Problems that have been reported by some users include:

- The phone can be unlocked without entering the PIN code if the intruder is able to swap in a different SIM card. This problem is exacerbated by the fact that Google terminates security patch support for its devices as soon as they have been on the market just three years; this vulnerability will affect all Pixel 3 and Pixel 4 devices unless/until the owner shifts to an alternate operating system such as GrapheneOS.
- After upgrading to Android 12, Pixel 3 devices may repeatedly dial emergency services before entering a boot loop; devices may reboot even during the call. A new gesture was added in Android 12 that causes devices to automatically dial emergency services after the power button is pressed five times — and while some users report that a stuck power button was the cause of this issue, other users report that emergency services continue to be dialed even after the gesture and Personal Safety app are disabled. Google has acknowledged the issue.
- Pixel 3 XL has imbalanced speakers. This is less pronounced on the smaller Pixel 3 due to its larger top speaker. Google said this was an intentional decision as they have used new amplifier technology with advanced speaker protection algorithms. The phone also produces an abnormal amount of vibration when using the speaker.
- Some Pixel 3 XL users have reported random notches displaying on the side of their screen.
- Some devices are overheating while charging and eventually shut down.
- The Pixel 3 loses some of the received messages. Google said that a fix will be delivered in a future update.
- Google sent some Verizon locked Pixel 3 devices to customers that ordered the unlocked model.
- Many users are reporting call quality and connection issues.
- The camera is slow both in launching the application and taking photos.
- Bluetooth audio has decreased volume compared to other devices.
- The speakerphone doesn't work at the start of a call.
- Fast wireless charging doesn't always work properly.
- Some devices have problems with autofocus. It is believed that the problem was introduced in the March security update.
- Some Pixel 3 devices are bricking themselves with an EDL message

=== Fixed issues ===
- Some users are reporting that some camera photos are failing to save. The issue may be related to Google Camera. Google has released a fix for this in the December 2018 update.
- Background music players will get killed if switching between apps. A small number of apps can stay in the background at any time. This may be related to how memory management is handled on the phones. This was also reportedly fixed with December 2018 patch.
- Placing the phone on the Google Pixel Stand breaks ambient notifications. Google has also already patched this.
- The camera crashed with a fatal error when used from 3rd party apps. This issue is reportedly fixed with the December 2018 software update.
- Audio recording was muffled. Google said this was by design, the microphone is specifically tuned to reduce background noise, while optimizing the spoken word. Audio recording quality issues have been fixed in the January 2019 system update.
- Some devices suffered from flickering display issues connected to Ambient Display. Google was able to fix this issue in the April 2019 security patch.

== Arbitration ==
When the Pixel 3 was released in 2018, its warranty automatically opted-in USA and Canadian based users to a Google Arbitration Agreement. Any disputes would be handled individually in small claims court, or via arbitration through the American Arbitration Association, or through government agencies, and not as class actions. The only exception was that intellectual property issues would be handled in court. It was possible to opt-out of this arbitration agreement within 30 days of activating the device for the first time. By 2020 Google's hardware warranty no longer covered arbitration, court, or class actions.
