= Google Fi Wireless =

Mobile network operator owned by Google

- Type: MVNO and mobile broadband service
- Location: United States; Roaming in 200+ international destinations
- Protocols: GSM / UMTS / LTE / NR
- Use: Wireless smartphone service
- Owner: Google
- Operator: T-Mobile US
- Established: April 22, 2015; 11 years ago
- Commercial?: Yes
- Website: fi.google.com

Google Fi Wireless app
- Developer: Google
- Release: April 2015; 11 years ago (for Android Lollipop)
- Stable release: 0.172 (Build 1020282799) / November 12, 2026; 7 days ago
- Operating system: Android 11+
- Website: fi.google.com/about/

Google Fi Wireless (pronounced /faɪ/), formerly Project Fi and Google Fi, is an American MVNO telecommunications service by Google that provides telephone calls, SMS, and mobile broadband using cellular networks and Wi-Fi. Google Fi uses the T-Mobile network. Google Fi is a service for US residents only, as of late 2023.

The service was launched for the Nexus 6, by invitation only, on April 22, 2015. The service was opened to the public on March 7, 2016. It began to work with additional device models, including the Pixel and Pixel XL smartphones, on October 4, 2016. On November 28, 2018, Google rebranded Project Fi as Google Fi and made it work with more device models, including partially with iPhones. In 2023, it was once again renamed Google Fi Wireless.

== History ==
Google Fi was announced exclusively for the Nexus 6 smartphone on April 22, 2015, on the Sprint and T-Mobile networks. Because of high demand at launch, the service required that users receive invitations, which were gradually released throughout summer 2015. The invitation system was dropped on March 7, 2016. U.S. Cellular was added on June 8, 2016. Three was added on July 12, 2016. In October 2016, Google added the ability to use Pixel and Pixel XL smartphones, and later introduced a Group Plan, letting subscribers add extra members to their plans.

In February 2023, Google Fi and US Cellular discontinued their partnership, leaving T-Mobile as the only network usable with it in the US.

== Features ==
Prior to the merger of Sprint and T-Mobile, Google Fi Wireless automatically switched between its partner networks depending on signal strength and speed. It automatically connects to open Wi-Fi hotspots while securing data with encryption through an automatic VPN. Phone calls transition to a cellular network if Wi-Fi coverage is lost.

Google Fi Wireless users could originally use the now defunct Google Hangouts on any phone, tablet, or computer to call and text. There is still a web interface for voice, texts, and voicemail available if you turn off RCS Chats in Google Messages.

Google Fi Wireless also implements VoLTE as part of a staged rollout.

In addition to using a phone's physical SIM card, Google Fi offers a Bring Your Own Device (BYOD) option whereby the customer uses their compatible phone (Google Pixel, Android or iPhone) using an eSIM (embedded SIM) virtual card to establish Google Fi as a standalone service or in conjunction with another provider. When a phone uses the DualSim, the phone owner can make and receive telephone calls from either Google Fi or the other mobile provider, but only one of the data service can be used at a time.

In October 2021, Google Fi Wireless announced that it would allow end-to-end encrypted calls.

== Plans ==
Monthly plans start at $20 per month and are flat fee-based, paid at the beginning of each monthly billing cycle. All plans include unlimited calls and messaging. Money for unused data is credited back to the user's account, while overuse of data results in a charge of $10 per gigabyte. When outside the United States, cellular phone calls cost $0.20 per minute, data costs the same $10 per gigabyte (i.e., there are no extra data charges outside of the US), and texting is free. Data is free at full speeds between 6 GB and 15 GB for the duration of the billing cycle with Bill Protection. After 15 GB, data continues to be free but will be throttled to unspecified speeds. With the Unlimited Premium plan users get up to 50 GB of high-speed data in 200+ destinations and 256 kbps after. A data-only SIM card can be used on tablets and other compatible devices, including the 2013 Nexus 7, Nexus 9, and iPad Air 2. The devices must be compatible with the T-Mobile network, and users can add up to 4 data-only SIM cards in one account (before July 2019 the limit was 9 data-only SIM cards in one account).

A Group Plan, which allows users, referred to as "managers", to add other people, referred to as "members", to their subscription, costs an additional $15 per user. Group Plans let managers view data usage by member, set data notifications, add monthly allowances, and pause members' data usage. In June 2017, Group Plans were updated to feature "Group Repay", in which Google Fi Wireless automatically calculates each of the members' individual shares of the bill and allows for easy payments. Such payments can be a fixed amount, an individual's total usage, or only for data usage above the standard data allotment.

== Reception ==
Nicole Lee of Engadget praised the service's plans, writing that "In the course of six months, I've barely touched my monthly 2 GB data allotment and frequently receive money back each month from unused data. I found myself paying a little more than $20 a month for Fi, which is the least I've paid for a cell phone service, ever." JR Raphael of Computerworld also praised the pricing strategy and network transitions. He noted that "Fi's customer support is [...] actually a pretty good experience", elaborating that "if you need extra help, both interfaces offer the ability to get 24/7 support from a real person via phone or email."

== See also ==
- Google Fiber
- Google Voice
