= Pixel 9a =

2025 Android smartphone by Google

- The front side of the Pixel 9a, in the Peony color
- Developer: Google
- Type: Smartphone
- Series: Pixel
- First released: April 10, 2025; 16 months ago
- Discontinued: March 5, 2026
- Predecessor: Pixel 8a
- Successor: Pixel 10a
- Related: Pixel 9, 9 Pro, 9 Pro XL; Pixel 9 Pro Fold
- Form factor: Slate
- Colors: Iris, Peony, Porcelain, Obsidian
- Dimensions: H: 6.1 in (154.7 mm); W: 2.9 in (73.3 mm); D: 0.4 in (8.9 mm)
- Weight: 6.56 oz (185.9 g)
- Operating system: Original: Android 15; Current: Android 17
- System-on-chip: Google Tensor G4
- Modem: Exynos 5300t
- Memory: 8 GB LPDDR5X
- Storage: 128 or 256 GB UFS 3.1
- SIM: Nano SIM and eSIM
- Battery: 5100 mAh
- Charging: Fast charging up to 23W; 7.5W Qi wireless charging
- Rear camera: 48 MP, f/1.7, 82° (wide), 1/2", 0.8 μm, Quad-PD Dual Pixel CLAF, OIS; 13 MP, f/2.2, 120˚ (ultrawide), 1.12 μm, EIS; Pixel Shift, Auto-HDR, panorama; 4K@30/60fps, 1080p@30/60/120fps; gyro-EIS, OIS
- Front camera: 13 MP, f/2.2, 96.1° (ultrawide), 1.12 μm; Auto-HDR, panorama; 4K@30fps, 1080p@30fps
- Display: 6.3 in (160.0 mm) 1080p FHD+ OLED; 1080 × 2424 px resolution, 20:9 aspect ratio (~422.2 ppi density); HDR, 60-120 Hz refresh rate, Corning Gorilla Glass 3
- Water resistance: IP68
- Website: Pixel 9a

The Pixel 9a is an Android-based smartphone designed, developed, and marketed by Google as part of its Google Pixel product line. It serves as a mid-range variant within the Pixel 9 series. The device has similar features and functionality with the rest of the Pixel 9 family, with the main focus on its improved durability, photography features, long battery life, AI-powered tools, and Gemini assistant integration.

It is the first A-series Pixel phone to have an IP68 dust and water resistance rating, and has the largest battery of a Pixel handset, at 5100 mAh. The battery has received criticism for being glued to the hardware, which prevents it from being replaced or recycled, opposing current industry practices. It is priced $499, the same as its predecessor.

== History ==
The Pixel 9a was announced on March 19, 2025, through a Google blog post. It follows the same shift in the sequential rollout as the rest of the Pixel 9 series by releasing around two months earlier compared to the previous generations. Typically, previous A-series Pixels would be announced in May, around or during the Google I/O Event around the same time.

On the same day the Pixel 9a was announced, Google spotted a potential "component quality issue" with a few number of the devices, and cancelled pre-orders and delayed the phone's launch until April 2025. It was originally slated to be released on March 26, 2025. A new release date of April 10th was later announced, after the issue was resolved. On the same month, GrapheneOS launched an experimental release for Pixel 9a.

== Design ==
The design of the Pixel 9a shares similarities with the rest of the Pixel 9 family, the notable exception being the rear cameras with smaller sensors that are now nearly flush with the body, as opposed to a camera cutout found on the other models in the family. Compared to its predecessor, the Pixel 8a, the body of the device has been squared up with flat rails and rounded edges, matching the rest of the Pixel 9 series. It is also the first Pixel phone since the Pixel 5a to not feature the customary visor or cutout that spans horizontally across the back, top-half of the device, which houses rear cameras and other sensors.

The Pixel 9a comes in four colors, Iris, Peony, Porcelain, and Obsidian.

Color options for the Pixel 9a series

Pixel 9a
Diagram of a Pixel 9a smartphone in light purple.	Diagram of a Pixel 9a smartphone in pink.	Diagram of a Pixel 9a smartphone in white.	Diagram of a Pixel 9a smartphone in black.
Iris	Peony	Porcelain	Obsidian
