= Pixel 8 =

2023 Android smartphones developed by Google

Pixel 8; Pixel 8 Pro
- Diagrams of the Pixel 8 (L) and Pixel 8 Pro (R)
- Brand: Google
- Developer: Google
- Type: Smartphone
- Series: Pixel
- First released: October 12, 2023; 3 years ago
- Availability by region: October 2023: Australia; Austria; Belgium; Canada; Denmark; France; Germany; India; Ireland; Italy; Japan; Netherlands; Norway; Portugal; Singapore; Spain; Switzerland; Sweden; Taiwan; United Kingdom; United States; May 2024: Czechia; Poland
- Discontinued: August 13, 2024
- Predecessor: Pixel 7; Pixel 7 Pro
- Successor: Pixel 9; Pixel 9 Pro; Pixel 9 Pro XL
- Related: Pixel 8a; Pixel Fold
- Compatible networks: GSM / EDGE; UMTS / HSPA+ / HSDPA; LTE; 5G sub-6 / mmWave
- Form factor: Slate
- Colors: Hazel; Obsidian; Rose; Mint; Bay; Obsidian; Porcelain; Mint
- Dimensions: Pixel 8: H: 5.9 in (150.5 mm); W: 2.8 in (70.8 mm); D: 0.4 in (8.9 mm); Pixel 8 Pro: H: 6.4 in (162.6 mm); W: 3.0 in (76.5 mm); D: 0.3 in (8.8 mm)
- Weight: Pixel 8: 6.6 oz (187 g); Pixel 8 Pro: 7.5 oz (213 g)
- Operating system: Android 14; Upgradable to Android 17
- System-on-chip: Google Tensor G3
- Modem: Samsung Exynos 5300i
- Memory: Pixel 8: 8 GB LPDDR5X; Pixel 8 Pro: 12 GB LPDDR5X
- Storage: Pixel 8: 128 or 256 GB UFS 3.1; Pixel 8 Pro: 128 GB, 256 GB, 512 GB, or 1 TB UFS 3.1
- SIM: Nano SIM and eSIM
- Battery: Pixel 8: 4575 mAh; Pixel 8 Pro: 5050 mAh
- Charging: Pixel 8: 27 W fast charging; 18 W Qi wireless charging; Pixel 8 Pro: 30 W fast charging; 23 W Qi wireless charging; Both: Reverse wireless charging
- Rear camera: Pixel 8: 12 MP, f/2.2, 125.8˚ field of view (ultrawide), 1.25 μm; Pixel 8 Pro: 48 MP, f/1.95, 125.5˚ field of view (ultrawide), 0.8 μm; 48 MP, f/2.8, 21.8˚ field of view (telephoto), 0.7 μm, 5× optical zoom; Both: 50 MP, f/1.68, 82˚ field of view (wide), 1.2 μm; 4K video at 24, 30, or 60 FPS; 1080p video at 24, 30, or 60 FPS
- Front camera: 10.5 MP, f/2.2, 95˚ field of view (ultrawide), 1.22 μm; 4K video at 24, 30, or 60 FPS
- Display: Pixel 8: 6.2 in (157 mm) FHD+ 1080p OLED at 428 ppi; 2400 × 1080 px (20:9); 60–120 Hz refresh rate; Pixel 8 Pro: 6.7 in (170 mm) QHD+ 1440p LTPO OLED at 489 ppi; 2992 × 1344 px (20:9); 1–120 Hz refresh rate; Both: HDR
- Sound: Stereo speakers; 3 microphones; Noise suppression; Spatial audio
- Connectivity: Wi-Fi 7 + MIMO; Bluetooth 5.3; NFC; Google Cast; Dual-band GNSS (GPS / GLONASS / Galileo / QZSS); USB-C 3.2
- Data inputs: Both: Accelerometer; Ambient light sensor; Barometer; Fingerprint scanner; Gyroscope; Magnetometer; Proximity sensor; Pixel 8 Pro: Temperature sensor
- Water resistance: IP68
- Model: Pixel 8: G9BQD, GKWS6; Pixel 8 Pro: GC3VE, G1MNW
- Codename: Pixel 8: Shiba; Pixel 8 Pro: Husky
- Hearing aid compatibility: M3, T4
- Made in: India (some models)
- Other: Pixel 8: Gorilla Glass Victus cover; Gorilla Glass Victus back; Pixel 8 Pro: Gorilla Glass Victus 2 cover; Gorilla Glass Victus 2 back; Ultra-wideband (UWB) chip; Both: Titan M2 security module
- Website: Pixel 8; Pixel 8 Pro

The Pixel 8 and Pixel 8 Pro are a pair of Android-based smartphones designed, developed, and marketed by Google as part of the Google Pixel product line. They serve as the successors to the Pixel 7 and Pixel 7 Pro, respectively. Visually, the phones resemble their respective predecessors, with incremental upgrades to their displays and performance. Powered by the third-generation Google Tensor system-on-chip, Google placed heavy emphasis on their artificial intelligence–powered features, especially in the realm of generative AI and photo editing.

The Pixel 8 and Pixel 8 Pro were officially announced on October 4, 2023, at the annual Made by Google event and were released in the United States on October 12. They received generally positive reviews from critics, who praised both the hardware and software despite their modest upgrades. The phones' AI features, Google's historic promise of seven years of software updates, and the Pro model's unconventional inclusion of a temperature sensor received significant attention and was heavily scrutinized, drawing mixed reactions. The mid-range variant Pixel 8a was released in May 2024.

The Pixel 8 and Pixel 8 Pro are the last Google Pixel phones to ship with Google Assistant as the default out-of-box assistant, as the Pixel 9 series and later ship with Gemini as the default assistant.

== History ==
In May 2023, 9to5Google reported that Google intended to launch the Pixel 8 and Pixel 8 Pro in late 2023. The phones were approved by the Federal Communications Commission (FCC) in August of that year. After previewing the phones in September, Google officially announced the phones on October 4, alongside the Pixel Watch 2, at the annual Made by Google event. Pre-orders became available the same day, and the phones became available in 21 countries on October 12. Google hardware chief Rick Osterloh announced later that month that the company would begin manufacturing its Pixel phones in India beginning in 2024 with the Pixel 8, following Apple's lead with the iPhone 15 series. Bloomberg News reported that Dixon Technologies and Foxconn were among the top contenders for the job.

== Specifications ==
=== Design ===
The Pixel 8 and Pixel 8 Pro are visually similar to the Pixel 7 and Pixel 7 Pro, respectively, with minor refinements such as a flatter screen, more rounded corners, and softer edges. The Pro model also features a matte finish. They were each available in three colors, with a fourth "Mint" color added in January 2024:

Color options for the Pixel 8 series
| Pixel 8 | | | | Pixel 8 Pro | | | |
| Diagram of a Pixel 8 smartphone in green. | Diagram of a Pixel 8 smartphone in black. | Diagram of a Pixel 8 smartphone in pink. | Diagram of a Pixel 8 smartphone in green. | Diagram of a Pixel 8 Pro smartphone in blue. | Diagram of a Pixel 8 Pro smartphone in black. | Diagram of a Pixel 8 Pro smartphone in white. | Diagram of a Pixel 8 Pro smartphone in green. |
| Hazel | Obsidian | Rose | Mint | Bay | Obsidian | Porcelain | Mint |

=== Hardware ===
The Pixel 8 has a 6.2 in (157 mm) FHD+ 1080p OLED display at 428 ppi with a 2400 × 1080 pixel resolution and a 20:9 aspect ratio, while the Pixel 8 Pro has a 6.7 in (170 mm) QHD+ 1440p LTPO OLED display at 489 ppi with a 2992 × 1344 pixel resolution and a 20:9 aspect ratio. The Pixel 8 has a variable refresh rate of 60–120 Hz, while the Pixel 8 Pro has variable refresh rate of 1–120 Hz. Both phones contain a wide and a ultrawide rear camera, with the Pixel 8 Pro featuring an additional 48 MP telephoto 5× optical zoom rear camera. The front camera on both phones contains a 10.5 MP ultrawide lens. As with the Pixel 7 series, the Face Unlock facial recognition system is enabled by software and the front camera, but adds support for secure biometric authentication.

The phones are powered by the third-generation Google Tensor system-on-chip (SoC), marketed as "Google Tensor G3", and the Titan M2 security co-processor. The OLED display, marketed as "Actua" and "Super Actua" on the Pixel 8 and Pixel 8 Pro, respectively, boasts "better color accuracy and higher brightness". The Pro model also features a temperature sensor on its rear camera bar, an unconventional feature for a smartphone. It was launched with its use on humans pending approval from the Food and Drug Administration. The Pixel 8 and Pixel 8 Pro were among the first phones on the market to support Wi-Fi 7, the latest wireless standard.

=== Software ===
The Pixel 8 and Pixel 8 Pro shipped with Android 14 at launch, coinciding with the stable release of Android 14 on the Android Open Source Project (AOSP), along with version 9.1 of the newly renamed Pixel Camera app. It will receive seven years of major OS upgrades, with support extending to 2030, a significant extension compared to previous generations that places the Pixel on par with Apple's typical support lifetime for iPhones, and was the first in the Android smartphone series to do so. Google also stated that it would stock spare parts for the devices for seven years. Wired and The Verge noted that these two commitments were potentially linked to California's impending right to repair act requiring companies to provide support for devices costing $100 or more for seven years.

As with previous Pixel smartphones, artificial intelligence and software advancements took center stage during the Made by Google launch event. New camera features announced include Best Take, an upgraded Magic Eraser, Night Sight Video, Magic Editor, Audio Magic Eraser, and Real Tone on video. Exclusive to the Pixel 8 Pro were Video Boost and manual "Pro" camera controls, although the latter was only artificially restricted to the Pro model via software.

As part of Google's ongoing response to OpenAI's ChatGPT, Google also announced "Assistant with Bard", an updated version of Google Assistant that would integrate the company's recently introduced Bard chatbot (later Gemini). Other generative AI features included improved call screening, faster voice typing, grammar suggestions on Gboard, upgrades to the Recorder app, and a new magnifier app. The Pixel 8 Pro was touted as the first piece of hardware to run Google's generative AI large language models fully on-device, with Gemini Nano later being integrated into both models.

== Marketing ==
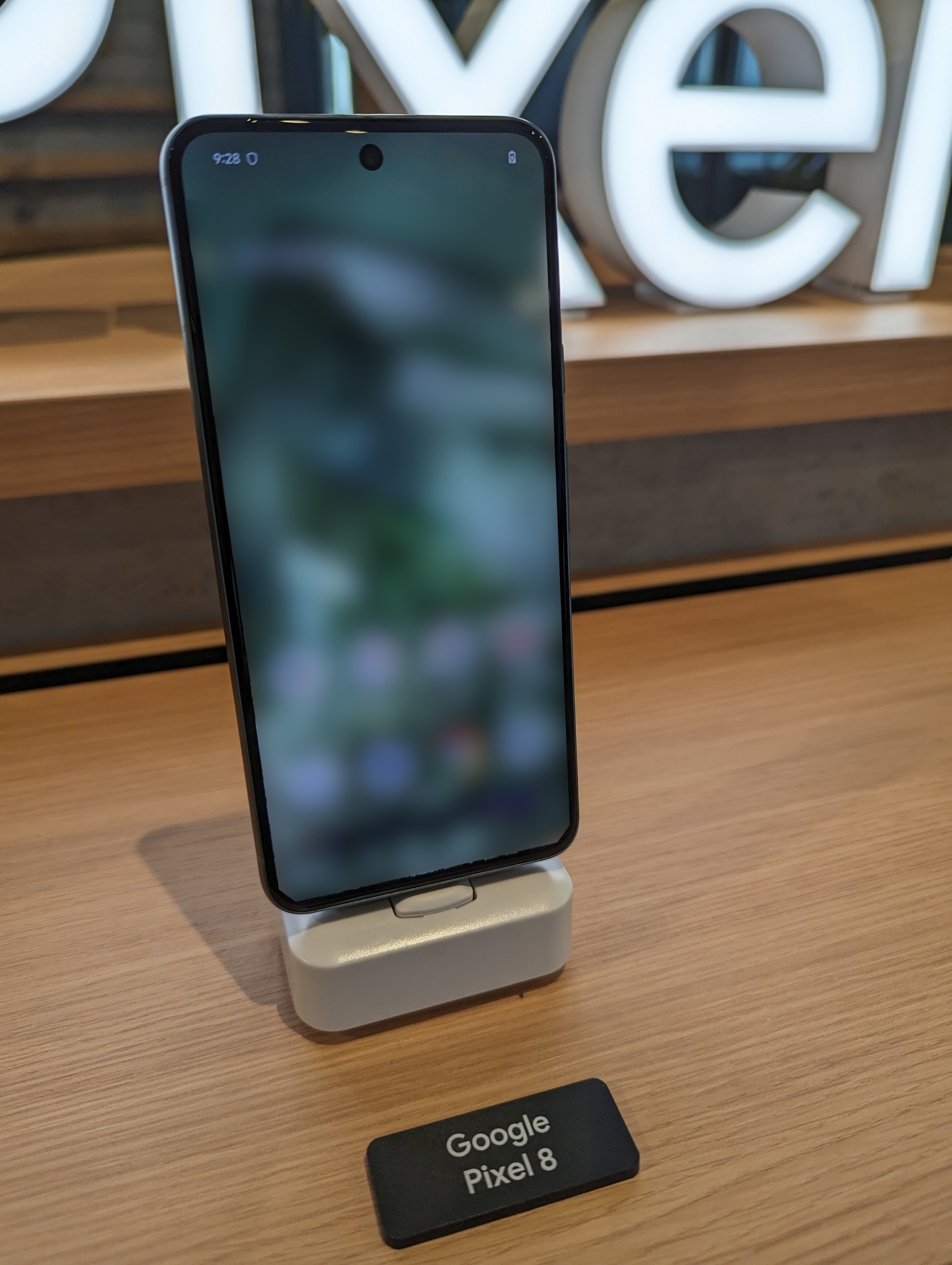
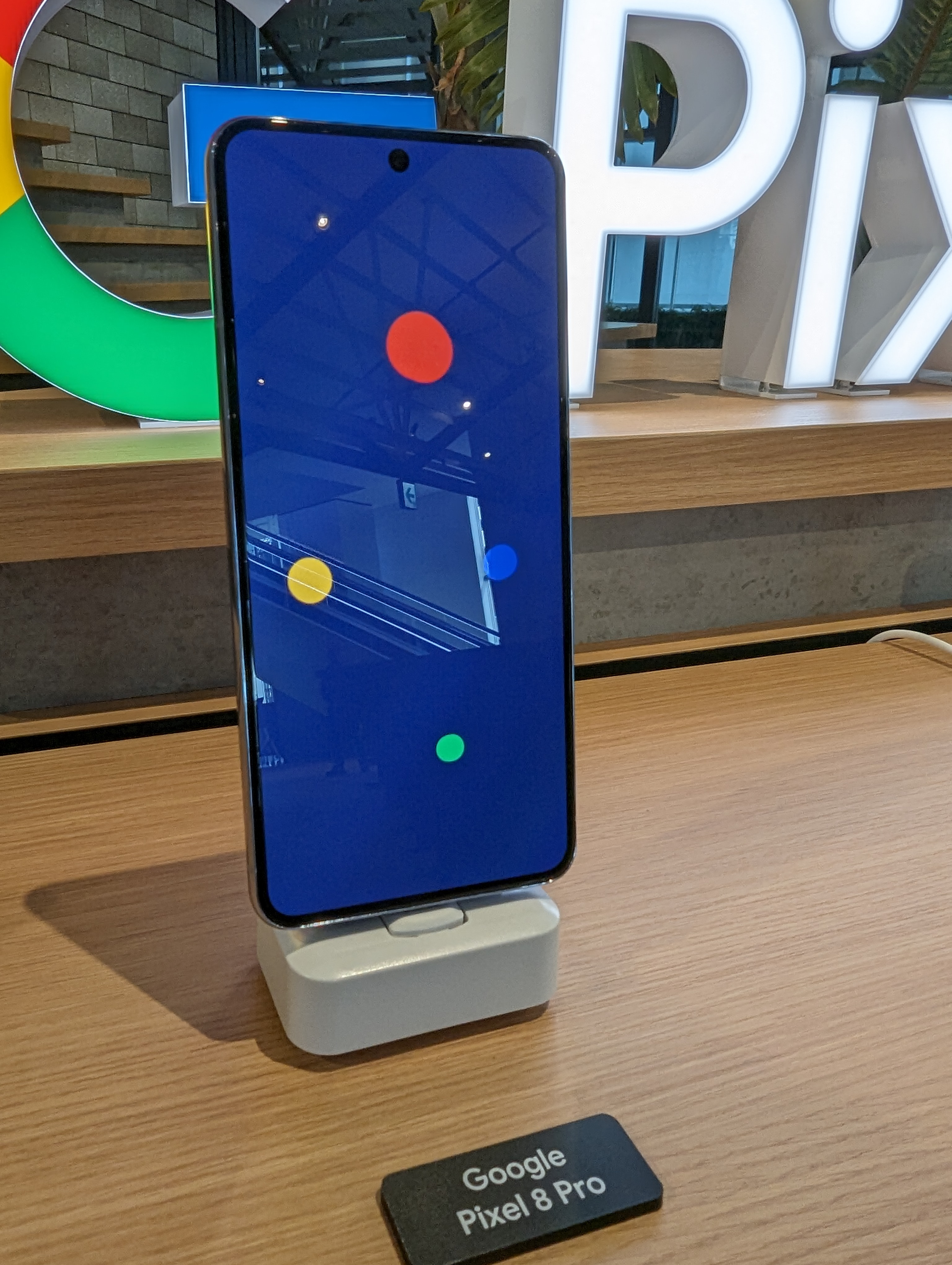
A Pixel 8 (L) and Pixel 8 Pro (R) on display at a store in Shibuya Stream in Tokyo, Japan

On launch day, Google partnered with X Corp. to include an Easter egg on X, formerly known as Twitter, when users searched the hashtag #GooglePixel. In November 2023, Google set up a "Google Pixel Experience Space" pop-up store in Taiwan to showcase the Pixel 8 and Pixel 8 Pro. In continuation of Google's multi-year sponsorship of the NBA, the Pixel 8's "Built Different" advertising campaign spanned the NBA's 2023–2024 season. A series of commercials, produced in collaboration with Robot Agency, featured numerous NBA athletes and personalities such as Jimmy Butler, Giannis Antetokounmpo, Thanasis Antetokounmpo, Chiney Ogwumike, Flau'jae Johnson, Jamad Fiin, Chris Brickley, Cameron Look, Richard Jefferson, and Crissa Jackson. Google also collaborated with The New York Times to capture street-style video for the publication's "Style Outside" column.

To promote the introduction of the "Mint" color in January 2024, Google partnered with street artist Ricardo Gonzalez to paint over a Pixel 8 billboard in New York City. In February 2024, Google released a commercial titled "Javier in Frame" which advertised the Pixel 8's Guided Frame feature, ahead of its airing during Super Bowl LVIII. Directed by Adam Morse and telling the story of a blind man named Javier who uses Guided Frame to "document important moments in his life", the 60-second commercial marked Google's third Super Bowl spot in a row to market the Pixel.

== Reception ==
=== Critical response ===
In early reactions, three aspects particularly piqued commentators' interest: the Pixel 8 Pro's temperature sensor, Google's promise of seven years of updates, and the heavy emphasis on AI. The temperature sensor drew varied reactions: some found it a potentially useful novelty, while others were bewildered and dismissed it as a strange gimmick. The response to Google's seven-year pledge was similarly divided: several journalists welcomed the move, hailing it as astonishing and monumental; others questioned whether Google would fulfill its promise.

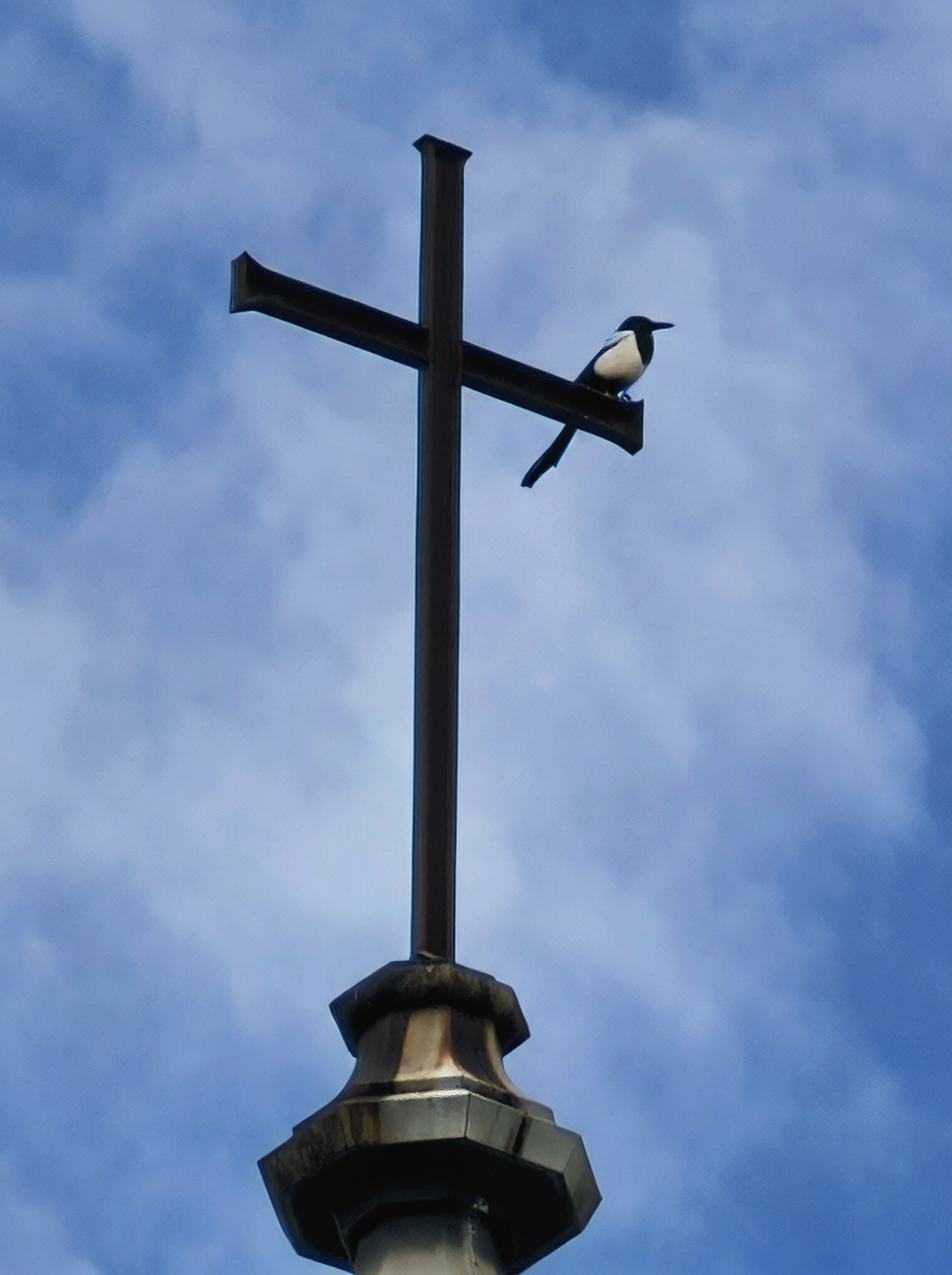
Sky-swap using the generative AI software (see metadata)

The Washington Post's Chris Velazco opined that the phones reflected "a deepening obsession with AI", with The Verge's Jon Porter describing the launch event as "a parade of AI", observing that the phrase "AI" had been invoked over fifty times. As the Pixel 8 was "the first mainstream phone to bake generative AI directly into the photo creation process at no extra cost", computer science professor Ren Ng at the University of California, Berkeley described it as a pivotal milestone in the area of imagery. Nicole Nguyen of The Wall Street Journal raised concerns with the implications of the Pixel 8's photo editing features, fearing that it could lead to an influx in "fauxtography", the malicious manipulation of photographs. The AI features themselves received mixed responses. Writing for Wired, Julian Chokkattu expressed excitement that these features, hitherto limited to those proficient with image or video editing software, were now being made accessible to a wider audience; Ben Sin of XDA Developers found them "fun and scary". Porter felt that some of the features showcased were unnecessary, concluding that Google was continuing to attempt to reassert its position as a leader in AI after ChatGPT's meteoric rise earlier that year had caught Google executives off-guard. Also writing for The Verge, Allison Johnson described the features as "complicated and messy", while her colleague Jay Peters contemplated the question, "What is a photo?"

Reviews were largely positive, though Mashable observed a prevalent discontent with the phones' battery life, temperature sensor, and higher prices. Writing for The Guardian, Samuel Gibbs praised the phones' affordability and build quality, while Digital Spy's Jason Murdock highlighted their cameras, performances, and displays. Chokkattu was thoroughly impressed by the phones' AI features, but was less pleased with the battery life and Face Unlock system. PCMag's Iyaz Akhtar echoed these sentiments, while June Wan of ZDNET and Daniel Howley of Yahoo! Finance also emphasized the usefulness of AI. Marques Brownlee thought the phones were a mixed bag, finding the AI features a hit-or-miss. CNN Underscored reviewer Max Buondonno offered glowing praise of both phones. The Verge's Allison Johnson was more skeptical, finding the AI features "useful [but] troubling", lamenting the higher prices, and questioning Google's seven-year-update promise. Mark Knapp of IGN appreciated the phones' modest hardware and performance upgrades, but felt they were inferior to Samsung's latest Android phones. Ron Amadeo of Ars Technica commended Google for abandoning curved screens in favor of a flat one, as well as praising its commitment to Tensor and software updates; however, he lambasted the Pro's temperature sensor as "embracing the worst of junky smartphone gimmicks". Forbes staff writer Rebecca Isaacs deemed the phones "a solid choice for casual users".

=== Commercial reception ===
Ryan Reith, an analyst at the International Data Group, predicted that Google could achieve higher sales numbers "if supported by strong marketing", considering its emphasis on AI. An opinion piece published in the Financial Times was headlined: "Price, not AI, will lift [the] Pixel's market share". Multiple publications have labeled the phones Google's latest subdued effort to compete with Apple's dominant iPhone sales.
