= Pixel Watch 3 =

2024 smartwatch developed by Google

- Brand: Google
- Developer: Google
- Type: Smartwatch
- Series: Pixel
- First released: September 10, 2024; 2 years ago (GA)
- Availability by region: 32 countries
- Predecessor: Pixel Watch 2
- Successor: Pixel Watch 4
- Operating system: Wear OS 7
- System-on-chip: Qualcomm SW5100
- CPU: ARM Cortex M33
- Memory: 2 GB SDRAM
- Storage: 32 GB eMMC flash
- Battery: 307 mAh (41mm)/420 mAh (45mm)

The Pixel Watch 3 is a Wear OS-based smartwatch designed, developed, and marketed by Google as part of the Google Pixel product line. It is the successor to the second-generation Pixel Watch.

The Pixel Watch 3 was officially announced on August 13, 2024, at the annual Made by Google event, and was released in the United States on September 10.

== History ==
9to5Google reported in January 2024 that Google was planning to release the Pixel Watch 3 in two sizes. The device was approved by the Federal Communications Commission (FCC) in July of that year. Google officially announced the Pixel Watch 3 on August 13, alongside the Pixel 9, Pixel 9 Pro, and Pixel 9 Pro Fold, at the annual Made by Google event.

== Specifications ==
=== Design ===
The Pixel Watch 3 retains the same basic design as the prior Pixel Watch 1 and 2 and is marketed in two sizes, 41 and 45 mm in diameter. While the 41 mm watch matches the size of prior Pixel Watches, the bezels are slightly smaller and there is 10% more display area. The 45 mm watch has 40% more display area compared to prior models. For each size, the maximum brightness is 2000 nits.

== Cost ==
Despite high starting costs, as of late May 2026, you can find 41mm BT versions for as low as $199 new and $249 for an LTE compatible version. 45 mm versions cost $199 and $279 respectively.

Color options for the Pixel Watch 3, 41mm
Case	Polished Silver	Matte Black	Champagne Gold	Polished Silver
Active Band	Rose Quartz	Obsidian	Hazel	Porcelain

Color options for the Pixel Watch 3, 45mm size
Case	Matte Black	Matte Hazel	Polished Silver
Active Band	Obsidian	Hazel	Porcelain

=== Software ===
The Pixel Watch 3 has a feature called Loss of Pulse Detection. This feature uses multiple sensors to detect that the heart has stopped beating (and not just that the wearer removed the watch). If the wearer does not respond in 20 seconds, the watch automatically calls emergency services. In February 2025 the FDA gave approval to unlock the feature, and in March 2025 Google enabled the feature through an update.
