= Skylo =

Satellite communications company

- Industry: Telecommunications
- Founded: 2017
- Headquarters: United States
- Key people: Parthsarathi Trivedi
- Products: Satellite communications
- Website: www.skylo.tech

Skylo is a satellite communications company headquartered in Mountain View, California that provides connectivity based on 3GPP Rel-17 for SMS, sensor data, and other low-bandwidth services, with plans that include voice calls and limited data for consumer devices. It connects regular cellular devices to satellites through existing satellite networks so they can work when terrestrial cellular coverage is not available, using a system that works with satellite operators, mobile networks, and device makers.

== History ==
Skylo was founded in 2017 by a team from Stanford University's space lab. The company first focused on satellite connectivity for IoT devices, then moved into direct-to-device satellite services for smartphones after satellite messaging appeared on consumer phones in the early 2020s.

Skylo built its system around NB-IoT and later 3GPP Release 17 standards for phone-to-satellite communications, and its network and support systems were deployed around that technology. By 2024, Skylo said its systems had already handled more than one million satellite-based messages.

In 2024, Skylo raised US$37 million in funding from Intel Capital and Innovation Endeavors, with participation from venture funds linked to BMW and Samsung. In 2025, Skylo announced another US$30 million funding round led by NGP Capital and said it had expanded commercial service to the United States, Brazil, Australia, and New Zealand.

== Services ==
Skylo provides direct-to-device satellite connectivity that allows compatible smartphones and IoT devices to send and receive SMS when cellular coverage is not available, using 3GPP Release 17 non-terrestrial network standards. In a trial in Greece, Skylo's satellite network was integrated into Cosmote's mobile network to enable SMS over a geostationary satellite using a device powered by the Snapdragon X80 modem-RF system.

On consumer smartphones, Skylo's service has been available on Pixel 9 phones and Verizon Galaxy S25 models, starting with emergency satellite messaging and expanding to everyday SMS text messaging. Voice calls and a limited amount of data are expected to be rolled out for consumer devices.

For wearables, Skylo's direct-to-device satellite connectivity for smartwatches was named a CES Innovation Awards honoree in 2026. Skylo's network has powered Satellite SOS on select smartphones since August 2024 and Satellite SMS since March 2025, and in August 2025 a smartwatch with built-in satellite communications powered by Skylo was introduced with the Google Pixel Watch 4.
