= Pixel 9 =

2024 Android smartphones developed by Google

Pixel 9; Pixel 9 Pro; Pixel 9 Pro XL
- From L to R: Diagrams of the Pixel 9 (Peony), Pixel 9 Pro (Hazel), and Pixel 9 Pro XL (Rose Quartz)
- Developer: Google LLC
- Type: Smartphone
- Series: Pixel
- First released: Pixel 9 and 9 Pro XL: August 22, 2024; 2 years ago; Pixel 9 Pro: September 4, 2024; 2 years ago
- Availability by region: August 2024: Australia; Austria; Belgium; Canada; Czech Republic; Denmark; Estonia; Finland; France; Germany; Hungary; India; Ireland; Italy; Japan; Latvia; Lithuania; Malaysia; Netherlands; Norway; Poland; Portugal; Romania; Singapore; Slovakia; Slovenia; Spain; Sweden; Switzerland; Taiwan; United Kingdom; United States
- Discontinued: August 20, 2025
- Predecessor: Pixel 8; Pixel 8 Pro
- Successor: Pixel 10; Pixel 10 Pro; Pixel 10 Pro XL
- Related: Pixel 9 Pro Fold; Pixel 9a
- Compatible networks: GSM / EDGE; UMTS / HSPA+ / HSDPA; LTE; 5G sub-6 / mmWave
- Form factor: Slate
- Colors: Peony; Wintergreen; Porcelain; Obsidian; Porcelain; Rose Quartz; Hazel; Obsidian
- Dimensions: Pixel 9 and 9 Pro: H: 6.0 in (152.8 mm); W: 2.8 in (72 mm); D: 0.3 in (8.5 mm); Pixel 9 Pro XL: H: 6.4 in (162.8 mm); W: 3.0 in (76.6 mm); D: 0.3 in (8.5 mm)
- Weight: Pixel 9: 7.0 oz (198 g); Pixel 9 Pro: 7.0 oz (199 g); Pixel 9 Pro XL: 7.8 oz (221 g)
- Operating system: Android 14, upgradable to Android 17
- System-on-chip: Google Tensor G4
- CPU: 1x 3.1 GHz Cortex-X4 + 3x 2.6 GHz Cortex-A720 + 4x 1.9 GHz Cortex-A520
- GPU: Mali-G715 MP7 (940 MHz)
- Modem: Samsung Exynos 5400
- Memory: Pixel 9: 12 GB LPDDR5X; Pixel 9 Pro and 9 Pro XL: 16 GB LPDDR5X
- Storage: Pixel 9: 128 or 256 GB UFS 3.1; Pixel 9 Pro and 9 Pro XL: 128 GB, 256 GB, 512 GB, or 1 TB UFS 3.1
- SIM: Nano SIM and eSIM
- Battery: Pixel 9 and 9 Pro: 4700 mAh; Pixel 9 Pro XL: 5060 mAh
- Charging: All: Reverse wireless charging; Pixel 9: 27 W fast charging; 15 W Qi wireless charging; Pixel 9 Pro: 27 W fast charging; 21 W Qi wireless charging; Pixel 9 Pro XL: 37 W fast charging; 23 W Qi wireless charging
- Rear camera: All: 50 MP, f/1.68, 82˚ field of view (wide); 48 MP, f/1.7, 123˚ field of view (ultrawide); 4K video at 24, 30, or 60 FPS; 1080p video at 24, 30, or 60 FPS; Pixel 9 Pro and 9 Pro XL: 48 MP, f/2.8, 22˚ field of view (telephoto), 5× optical zoom; 8K video at 30 FPS
- Front camera: Pixel 9: 10.5 MP, f/2.2, 95˚ field of view (ultrawide); Pixel 9 Pro and 9 Pro XL: 42 MP, f/2.2, 103˚ field of view (ultrawide); All: 4K video at 30 or 60 FPS
- Display: Pixel 9: 6.3 in (160 mm) FHD+ 1080p OLED at 422 ppi; 2424 × 1080 px (20:9); 60–120 Hz refresh rate; Pixel 9 Pro: 6.3 in (161 mm) FHD+ 1080p LTPO OLED at 495 ppi; 2856 × 1280 px (20:9); 1–120 Hz refresh rate; Pixel 9 Pro XL: 6.7 in (171 mm) QHD+ 1440p LTPO OLED at 486 ppi; 2992 × 1344 px (20:9); 1–120 Hz refresh rate; All: HDR
- Sound: Stereo speakers; 3 microphones; Noise suppression; Spatial audio
- Connectivity: Wi-Fi 7 + MIMO; Bluetooth 5.3; NFC; Google Cast; Dual-band GNSS (GPS / GLONASS / Galileo); USB-C 3.2
- Data inputs: All: Accelerometer; Ambient light sensor; Barometer; Fingerprint scanner; Gyroscope; Magnetometer; Proximity sensor; Pixel 9 Pro and 9 Pro XL: Temperature sensor
- Water resistance: IP68
- Other: All: Gorilla Glass Victus 2 cover; Gorilla Glass Victus 2 back; Titan M2 security module; Pixel 9 Pro and 9 Pro XL: Ultra-wideband (UWB) chip
- Website: Pixel 9; Pixel 9 Pro and 9 Pro XL

The Pixel 9, Pixel 9 Pro, and Pixel 9 Pro XL are a group of Android-based smartphones designed, developed, and marketed by Google as part of the Google Pixel product line. They serve as the successor to the Pixel 8 and Pixel 8 Pro, respectively. Sporting a redesigned appearance and powered by the fourth-generation Google Tensor system-on-chip, the phones are heavily integrated with Gemini-branded artificial intelligence features.

The Pixel 9, Pixel 9 Pro, and Pixel 9 Pro XL were officially announced on August 13, 2024, at the annual Made by Google event, and were released in the United States on August 22 and September 4 for the Pixel 9 Pro Fold. They were succeeded by the Pixel 10, the Pixel 10 Pro, Pixel 10 Pro XL, and the Pixel 10 Pro Fold, which were unveiled at the Made by Google event on August 20, 2025.

== History ==
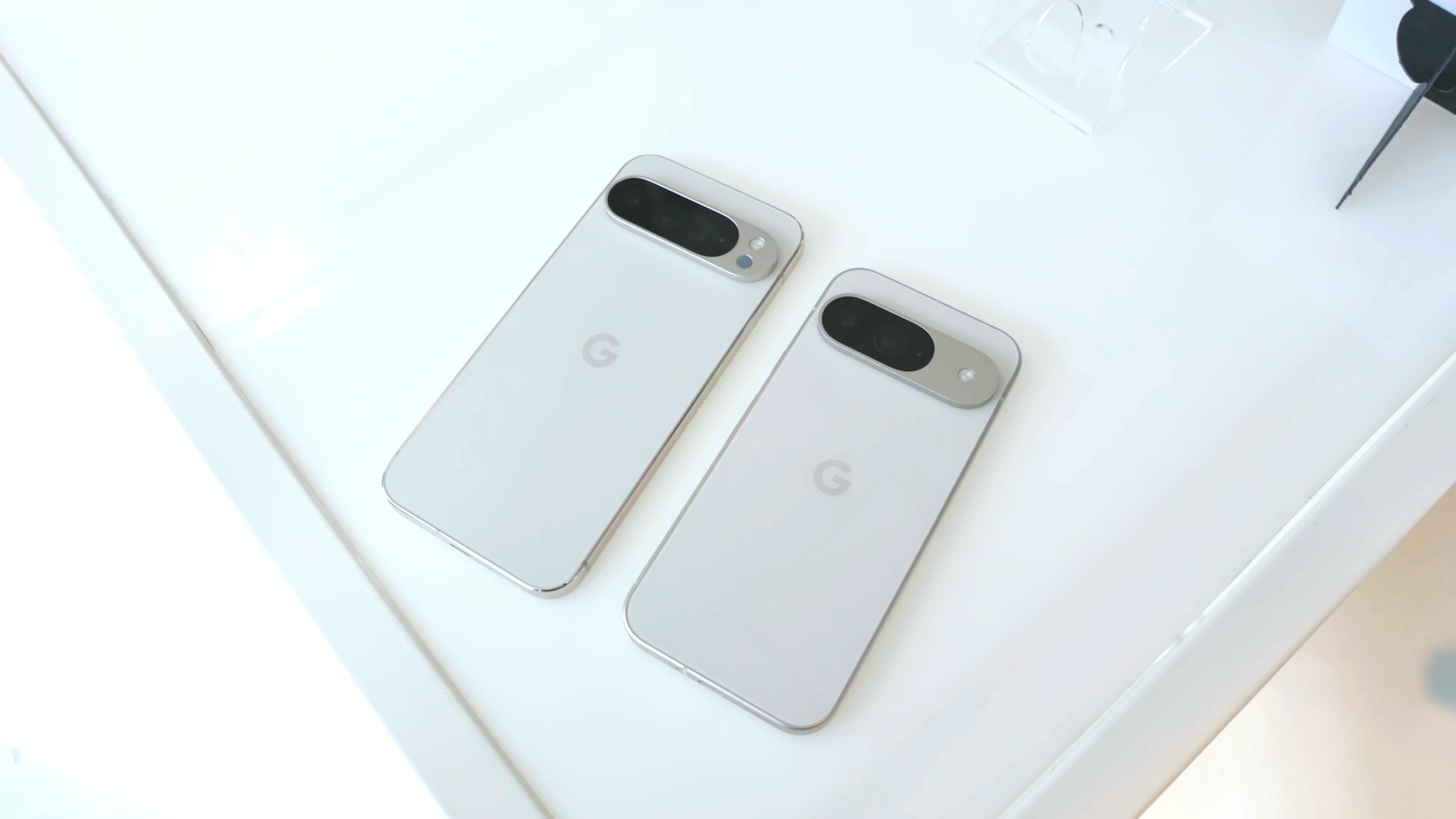
The Pixel 9 (R) and 9 Pro XL (L), both in "Porcelain" color

The Pixel 9 series was approved by the Federal Communications Commission (FCC) in July 2024. After previewing the Pro model the same month, Google officially announced the Pixel 9, Pixel 9 Pro, and Pixel 9 Pro XL on August 13, alongside the Pixel 9 Pro Fold and Pixel Watch 3, at the annual Made by Google event. Numerous observers noted the unusually early timing of the launch event, which was traditionally held in September after Apple's annual launch of the new iPhone. Commentators described this as an attempt to “outshine” Apple, its longtime rival, and demonstrate its artificial intelligence (AI) prowess. (Note: Attributed to multiple references:) Several also took note of Google's usually frequent veiled attacks targeting Apple. All three phones became available for pre-order the same day; the Pixel 9 and Pixel 9 Pro XL were made available on August 22 while the Pro was available on September 4, the latter alongside the Pixel 9 Pro Fold, in 32 countries.

Pixel 9 owners on Verizon US can text from anywhere outside the network reach via satellite.

== Specifications ==
=== Design ===
The Pixel 9, Pixel 9 Pro, and Pixel 9 Pro XL feature a redesigned appearance while retaining the overall design language that began with the Pixel 6 series, with the edges now flat rather than curved and the camera bar taking the shape of "an elongated, free-floating […] oval". They are each available in four colors:

Color options for the Pixel 8 series
Pixel 9				Pixel 9 Pro and 9 Pro XL			
Diagram of a Pixel 9 smartphone in pink.	Diagram of a Pixel 9 smartphone in green.	Diagram of a Pixel 9 smartphone in white.	Diagram of a Pixel 9 smartphone in black.	Diagram of a Pixel 9 Pro smartphone in white.	Diagram of a Pixel 9 Pro smartphone in pink.	Diagram of a Pixel 9 Pro smartphone in gray.	Diagram of a Pixel 9 Pro smartphone in black.
Peony	Wintergreen	Porcelain	Obsidian	Porcelain	Rose Quartz	Hazel	Obsidian

=== Hardware ===
In a departure from previous generations, the Pixel 9 series was offered in three models: the base model, a “Pro” model, and a new “Pro XL” model. The Pixel 9 and Pixel 9 Pro are near-identical in size, with a 6.3 in (160 mm) screen size, while the Pixel 9 Pro XL is slightly larger at 6.7 in (171 mm). A key distinction between the base and Pro models lies in the camera setup, with the higher-end models sporting a 48-megapixel telephoto rear camera in addition to the standard 50- and 48-megapixel wide and ultrawide lenses; the Pro models also include a 42-megapixel ultrawide front camera compared to 10.5 megapixels on the base.

All three phones are powered by the fourth-generation Google Tensor system-on-chip (SoC), marketed as "Google Tensor G4", and the Titan M2 security co-processor. The upgraded Samsung Exynos 5400 modem on the new Tensor chip enhances the Pixel 9's satellite connectivity, enabling the ability to contact emergency services via satellite, similar to the feature introduced by Apple on the iPhone 14 and the first Android phone to be equipped with this technology. Dubbed “Satellite SOS”, Google partnered with satellite network provider Skylo and SOS dispatch center Garmin on the feature, which was made available for free for two years. Tensor G4 is also the first SoC to run Gemini Nano, a version of the Gemini large language model (LLM), with multimodality.

=== Software ===
As with prior Pixel generations, the Pixel 9 series is equipped with numerous AI-powered features, with the Associated Press calling it a "vessel for the AI technology that is expected to reshape the way people live and work". Google dedicated the first half-hour of its launch event discussing its advances in the field before unveiling its new devices. Gemini, a generative AI–powered chatbot launched in 2023 in response to OpenAI's ChatGPT, was frequently spotlighted, replacing the Google Assistant as the new default virtual assistant on Pixel and heavily integrating into the Pixel 9 series. In order to facilitate on-device AI processing, the RAM on the Pixel 9 series was substantially increased. Google also debuted Gemini Live, a new voice chat mode powered by the Imagen 3 text-to-image model.

Other AI-powered features included Pixel Studio, an image generation app; Pixel Screenshots, a screenshot management and analysis app; Add Me, the ability to retroactively add subjects to photos; Pixel Weather, a new weather forecast app; Call Notes, which summarizes phone calls while running on-device; and miscellaneous camera updates. Breaking with tradition, the Pixel 9 series was shipped with the year-old Android 14 rather than Android 15, likely due to the earlier-than-usual timeframe; the phones were updated with Android 15 via a “Pixel Drop” software update, formerly known as Feature Drops, on October 15. Continuing the Pixel 8's trend, the phones will receive seven years of major OS upgrades, with support extending to 2031.

== Marketing ==
An “after party” livestream hosted by actress Keke Palmer and featuring celebrity guest appearances followed the Made by Google event. Days after the phones' launch, Google generated controversy after several social media influencers part of the seven-year-old #TeamPixel marketing program posted screenshots of a new clause stipulating that participants must not show preference for competitors when creating content with the Pixel 9. Missing context led to confusion online regarding the extent of the restriction, which only applied to #TeamPixel influencers. Google later apologized and removed the clause from the agreement.

In February 2025, Google released a commercial titled “Dream Job” which advertised Gemini on the Pixel 9, ahead of its airing during Super Bowl LIX. One of Google's two Super Bowl spots that year, the 60-second commercial featured a father using Gemini on his Pixel 9 to prepare for a job interview. Google also ran a third commercial entitled “Party Blitz” online, in which a man "attempts to impress his girlfriend's family by using Gemini [on his Pixel 9] to become a football expert".

== Reception ==
In his initial reaction to the Pixel 9 series, Android Police's Rajesh Pandey praised the overall design but disliked the iPhone-esque flat edges and polished metal frame. His colleague Taylor Kerns questioned the absence of an “XL” version of the base model, while Rebecca Isaacs of Forbes welcomed the addition of small-sized Pro model and the enhanced build quality. Pandey and Kerns' colleague Will Sattelberg concurred but had mixed reactions to the AI-powered features. Allison Johnson of The Verge was impressed by the camera features, writing in a headline, "The Pixel 9 Pro XL showed me the future of AI photography". Writing for Mashable, Kimberly Gedeon was drawn to the design of the 9 Pro XL, praising the upgraded Super Res Zoom feature and AI-powered features. PCMag's Iyaz Akhtar called the rear design of the phones “divisive” but “sleek”. Kyle Barr of Gizmodo and Philip Michaels of Tom's Guide both found themselves particularly attracted to the Pixel Screenshots app. Kerry Wan of ZDNET predicted that the phones would be a "sleeper hit".

The Pixel 9's Tensor G4 processor has also received mixed reviews. While it was praised for improved AI capabilities, some have criticized its poor efficiency under heavy load and lack of performance improvements over the Tensor G3, especially when compared to other flagship processors at the time. Soniya Jobanputra, a lead member of the Pixel's product management team, told The Financial Express that the G4 was not designed to "beat some specific benchmark that’s out there. We’re designing it to meet our use cases”.

GrapheneOS began officially supporting the Pixel 9, Pixel 9 Pro, and Pixel 9 Pro XL in August 2024, with full compatibility, shortly after the devices began shipping to consumers.
