= Pixel Watch 4 =

2025 smartwatch developed by Google

- Brand: Google
- Type: Smartwatch
- Series: Pixel
- First released: October 9, 2025; 10 months ago (GA)
- Availability by region: 33 countries
- Predecessor: Pixel Watch 3
- Successor: Pixel Watch 5
- Dimensions: 41/45mm
- Weight: 31/36.7g (without strap)
- Operating system: Wear OS 6
- System-on-chip: Qualcomm Snapdragon W5 Gen 2
- CPU: 4x ARM Cortex A53 + 1x ARM Cortex M55 (co-processor)
- GPU: 1 GHz Adreno A702
- Memory: 2 GB LPDDR4
- Storage: 32 GB eMMC flash
- Battery: 325 mAh (41mm)/455 mAh (45mm)
- Sound: Speaker; Microphone

The Pixel Watch 4 is a Wear OS-based smartwatch designed, developed, and marketed by Google as part of the Google Pixel product line. It is the successor to the third-generation Pixel Watch.

The Pixel Watch 4 was officially announced on August 20, 2025, at the annual Made by Google event, and was released in the United States on October 9.

== History ==
Google officially announced the Pixel Watch 4 on August 20, alongside the Pixel 10, Pixel 10 Pro, and Pixel 10 Pro Fold, and the Pixel Buds 2a at the annual Made by Google event.

== Specifications ==
=== Design ===
The screen of the Pixel Watch 4 is now domed, as opposed to the flat screen of previous models, and has 15% smaller bezels from the Pixel Watch 3.

=== Hardware ===
The Pixel Watch is available in two sizes: 41mm and 45mm, and each offers an option for 4G LTE cellular connectivity. The Pixel Watch 4 was the first model in the Pixel Watch series designed to allow screen and battery repairs. According to Google, disassembling the watch for those repairs does not void the one-year warranty, and replacement parts for the screen and battery are sold through iFixit. The charger has changed for the third time in the Pixel Watch series, as this model now offers a side-mounted dock, as opposed to the pin-based charging connector of the Pixel Watch 2 and 3. It is the first model in the lineup to offer a dual-frequency GPS, and is the first commercial smartwatch in the world to support standalone emergency satellite communications and Bluetooth 6.

=== Software ===
The Pixel Watch ships with Wear OS 6, and features further integration with Fitbit. It is compatible with Android smartphones running Android 11.0 or above, and is accompanied by a Pixel Watch mobile app available for download on the Google Play Store.
