= Pixel Fold =

2023 foldable smartphone developed by Google

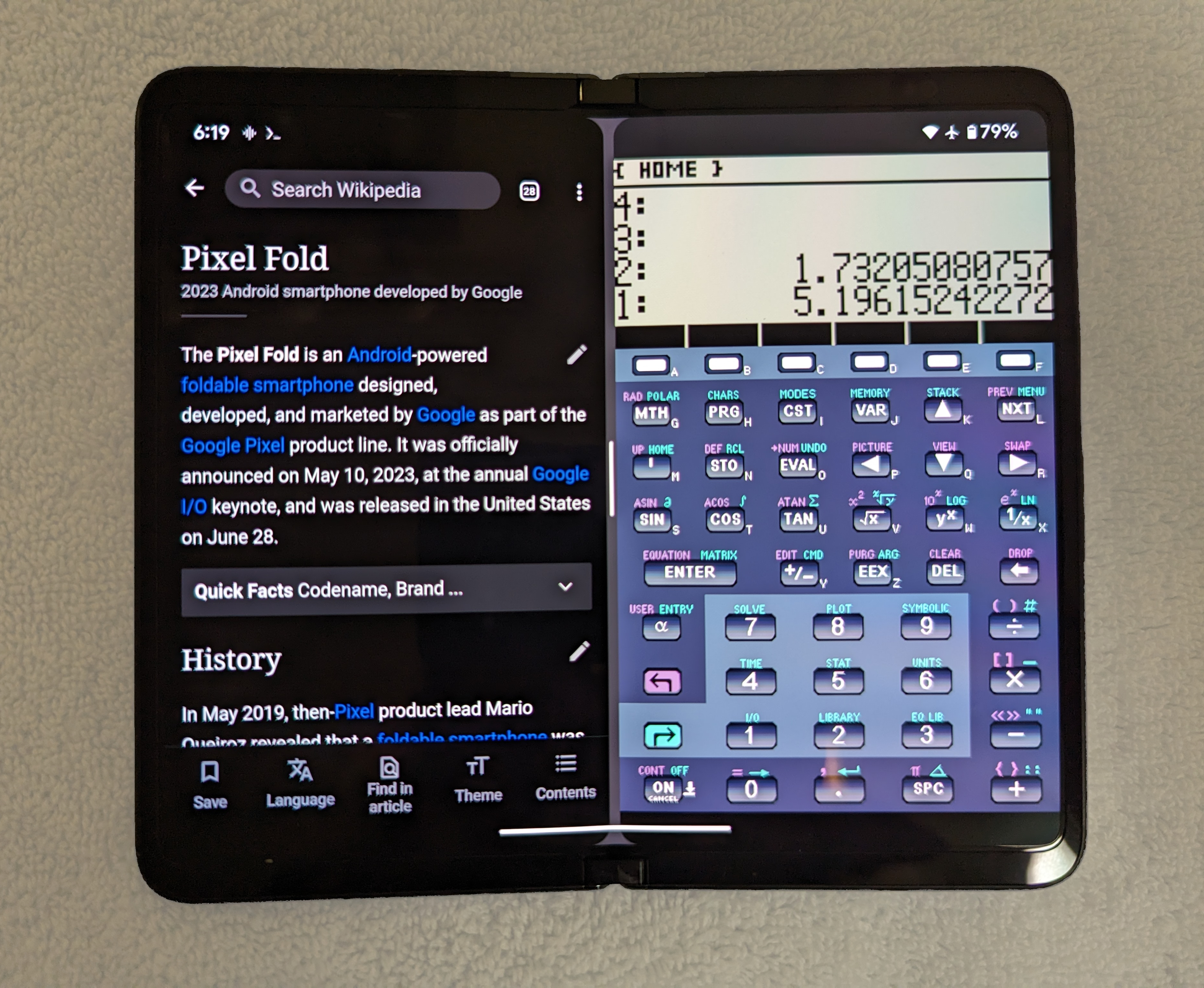
- An Obsidian Pixel Fold, unfolded, running two apps
- Brand: Google
- Type: Foldable
- Series: Pixel
- First released: June 28, 2023; 3 years ago
- Availability by region: June 2023: Germany; Japan; United Kingdom; United States
- Discontinued: August 13, 2024
- Successor: Pixel 9 Pro Fold
- Related: Pixel 7; Pixel 7a
- Compatible networks: GSM / EDGE; UMTS / HSPA+ / HSDPA; LTE; 5G sub-6 / mmWave
- Form factor: Slate
- Dimensions: Folded: H: 5.5 in (139.7 mm); W: 3.1 in (79.5 mm); D: 0.5 in (12.1 mm); Unfolded: H: 5.5 in (139.7 mm); W: 6.2 in (158.7 mm); D: 0.2 in (5.8 mm)
- Weight: 10.0 oz (283 g)
- Operating system: Original: Android 13; Current: Android 17
- System-on-chip: Google Tensor G2
- Memory: 12 GB LPDDR5
- Storage: 256 or 512 GB UFS 3.1
- SIM: Nano SIM and eSIM
- Battery: 4821 mAh
- Charging: 30 W fast charging; Qi wireless charging
- Rear camera: 48 MP, f/1.7, 82˚ field of view (wide), 0.8 μm; 10.8 MP, f/2.2, 121.1˚ field of view (ultrawide), 1.25 μm; 10.8 MP, f/3.05, 21.9˚ field of view (telephoto), 1.22 μm; 4K video at 30 or 60 FPS; 1080p video at 30 or 60 FPS
- Front camera: Folded: 9.5 MP, f/2.2, 84˚ field of view (wide), 1.22 μm; 4K video at 30 or 60 FPS; 1080p video at 30 or 60 FPS; Unfolded: 8 MP, f/2.0, 84˚ field of view (wide), 1.12 μm; 1080p video at 30 FPS
- Display: Folded: 5.8 in (146.7 mm) FHD+ 1080p OLED at 408 ppi; 2092 × 1080 px (17.4:9); 120 Hz refresh rate; Unfolded: 7.6 in (192.3 mm) FHD+ 1080p OLED at 380 ppi; 2208 × 1840 px (6:5); 120 Hz refresh rate; Both: HDR
- Sound: Spatial audio; Stereo speakers; 3 microphones; Noise suppression
- Connectivity: Wi-Fi 6E + HE160 + MIMO; Bluetooth 5.2; NFC; Google Cast; Dual-band GNSS (GPS / GLONASS / Galileo / QZSS); USB-C 3.2
- Data inputs: Accelerometer; Ambient light sensor; Barometer; Fingerprint scanner; Gyroscope; Hall effect; Magnetometer; Proximity sensor
- Water resistance: IPX8
- Model: G9FPL
- Codename: Felix
- Hearing aid compatibility: M3, T4
- Other: Folded: Gorilla Glass Victus cover; Unfolded: Ultra Thin Glass cover; Both: Gorilla Glass Victus back; Titan M2 security module; Ultra-wideband (UWB) chip
- Website: Pixel Fold

The Pixel Fold is an Android-powered foldable smartphone designed, developed, and marketed by Google as part of the Google Pixel product line. It was officially announced on May 10, 2023, at the annual Google I/O keynote, and was released in the United States on June 28. Reception was mixed, with many critics praising the phone's cameras and overall design but criticizing the price, durability, weight, and inner display.

== History ==
In May 2019, then-Pixel product lead Mario Queiroz revealed that a foldable smartphone was in early development at Google's hardware division. However, the company had no immediate plans to bring said phone to the market. The company had previously filed a patent for an unknown foldable display in March. By August 2020, an Android-powered Pixel foldable was in active development, with the codename "Passport" and a planned launch date of late 2021. This had been delayed to 2022 by November 2021, with the device now codenamed "Pipit". Shortly thereafter, Google abandoned its plans for a Pixel foldable due to increased competition from other smartphone manufacturers, before restarting production by January 2022. 9to5Google reported "Pixel Notepad" as a potential name for the device, with "Pixel Logbook" previously being considered. In September 2022, The New York Times reported that Google was "exploring" a foldable phone with a targeted release date of 2023; by then, Google was working on the third iteration of the Pixel foldable, now codenamed "Felix". Google designer Ivy Ross later explained that Google had held off releasing the foldable for so long because they felt prototype models had not been "good enough yet".

CNBC reported the device's name to be the "Pixel Fold" in April 2023, asserting that it would be similar to Samsung's Galaxy Z Fold series in terms of specifications and pricing. The phone was reported to be powered by the second-generation Tensor system-on-a-chip and be the most expensive entry in Google's Pixel lineup yet. The device was approved by the Federal Communications Commission in May, ahead of its imminent launch. On May 4, Google confirmed the device's existence on social media, revealing its full design and teasing an announcement at the forthcoming Google I/O keynote. The company unveiled the Pixel Fold at I/O on May 10 accordingly, with pre-orders available immediately at the online Google Store. With the Fold's launch, Apple became the only major smartphone brand without a foldable offering. Other wireless carriers began pre-orders in late June. it became available in four countries on June 28. Days after receiving their devices, many buyers reported that their screens had broken.

== Specifications ==
=== Design ===
The Pixel Fold is available in two colors:

Color options for the Pixel Fold
Porcelain			Obsidian		
Diagram of the front of a Pixel Fold smartphone in white.	Diagram of the interior of a Pixel Fold smartphone in white.	Diagram of the back of a Pixel Fold smartphone in white.	Diagram of the front of a Pixel Fold smartphone in black.	Diagram of the interior of a Pixel Fold smartphone in black.	Diagram of the back of a Pixel Fold smartphone in black.
Front, folded	Front, unfolded	Back	Front, folded	Front, unfolded	Back

=== Hardware ===
The Pixel Fold has a 5.8 in (146.7 mm) display, which opens vertically to reveal a 7.6 in (192.3 mm) display. At launch, it was the shortest and widest Pixel phone, and the thinnest foldable smartphone on the market. The exterior screen is edge-to-edge, akin to regular smartphones, while the interior screen has slim black bezels. Both displays have a 120 Hz variable refresh rate, while the phone's battery size of 4821 mAh is the largest amongst foldables in the U.S. It is available in 256 or 512 GB of storage and 12 GB of RAM. Google markets the phone as having the "most durable hinge on a foldable". It is equipped with a total of five cameras, with three on the back, one on the front, and one on the inside. The three rear cameras include a 48 megapixel wide lens, a 10.8 megapixel ultrawide lens, and a 10.8 megapixel telephoto lens; the front camera has a 9.5 megapixel sensor, while the inner camera has an 8 megapixel sensor.

=== Software ===
The Pixel Fold shipped with Android 13.

== Marketing ==
Ahead of its launch at I/O in May 2023, the Pixel Fold was included in a commercial starring NBA and WNBA athletes. In June, the Pixel Fold and Pixel 7 Pro were featured in a series of comparative advertisements targeting the iPhone.

== Reception ==
Critical reception to the Pixel Fold was decidedly mixed. Ron Amadeo of Ars Technica gave the phone high praise, deeming it vastly superior to the competition. Chris Wedel of XDA Developers called it a respectable first attempt from Google, praising the Fold's compact design, cameras, and software. Engadget's Sam Rutherford agreed, also highlighting the phone's design, cameras, and software, while expressing ambivalence over its price and durability. Brian Heater of TechCrunch called it a "well-rounded take on the foldable form factor", but was disappointed that the high price meant it was unlikely to become a "mainstream device".

Writing for Android Police, Will Sattelberg lamented that the Pixel Fold "fails to live up to its full potential", specifically criticizing the quality of the inner display and the phone's durability, or lack thereof. The Washington Post's Chris Velazco found it to be a mixed bag, praising its design and cameras but feeling that its shortcomings and lack of uniqueness made the high price "harder to swallow". Samuel Gibbs of The Guardian appreciated the Fold's wider and shorter screen and lauded its cameras, but was less enthusiastic about the software, price, and heaviness. Allison Johnson of The Verge also criticized its price, durability, and heaviness, while finding the camera system versatile and praising the design. Her colleague Dan Seifert opined that the Fold was inferior to Samsung's foldables in various aspects.

Analyst Anshel Sag of Moor Insights & Strategy believed that the Pixel Fold's high price signaled that Google was not seeking to achieve high sales numbers, but rather use the device as a "vessel on which [it] can perfect its foldable software future".

== See also ==
- Galaxy Z series
- Surface Duo
