= Pixel 9 Pro Fold =

2024 foldable smartphone developed by Google

- Pixel 9 Pro Fold (Porcelain), open to show internal screen
- Developer: Google
- Manufacturer: Foxconn
- Type: Smartphone
- Series: Pixel
- Availability by region: September 2024: Australia; Austria; Bahrain; Bangladesh; Belgium; Brazil; Canada; China; Chile; Colombia; Croatia; Czech Republic; Denmark; Estonia; Finland; France; Germany; Hong Kong; Hungary; India; Ireland; Israel; Italy; Jamaica; Japan; Kuwait; Laos; Latvia; Lithuania; Luxembourg; Macau; Malaysia; Myanmar; Netherlands; New Zealand; Nigeria; Norway; Oman; Pakistan; Panama; Peru; Philippines; Poland; Portugal; Qatar; Romania; Saudi Arabia; Serbia; Singapore; Slovakia; Slovenia; South Africa; Spain; Sweden; Switzerland; Taiwan; Turkey; United Kingdom; United States; Vietnam
- Discontinued: August 20, 2025
- Predecessor: Pixel Fold
- Successor: Pixel 10 Pro Fold
- Related: Pixel 9; Pixel 9 Pro; Pixel 9 Pro XL
- Compatible networks: GSM / EDGE; UMTS / HSPA+ / HSDPA; LTE; 5G sub-6 / mmWave
- Form factor: Foldable
- Colors: Porcelain, Obsidian
- Operating system: Original: Android 14 (QPR3); Current: Android 17
- System-on-chip: Google Tensor G4
- Memory: 16 GB LPDDR5
- Storage: 256 or 512 GB UFS 3.1
- SIM: Nano SIM and eSIM
- Battery: 4650 mAh
- Charging: 30 W fast charging; Qi wireless charging
- Rear camera: 48 MP
- Front camera: 10 MP
- Water resistance: IPX8
- Website: Pixel 9 Pro Fold

The Pixel 9 Pro Fold is an Android-powered foldable smartphone designed, developed, and marketed by Google as part of the Google Pixel product line. It serves as the successor to the first-generation Pixel Fold. It was officially announced on August 13, 2024, at the annual Made by Google event, and was released in the United States on September 4, 2024.

== History ==
In October 2023, 9to5Google reported that a second Android-powered foldable smartphone was in development at Google, codenamed “Comet”. This came after the release of the first-generation Pixel Fold the previous year.

After previewing the phone in July 2024, Google officially announced the phone on August 13, alongside the Pixel 9, Pixel 9 Pro, Pixel 9 Pro XL, and Pixel Watch 3, at the annual Made by Google event. The Pixel 9 Pro Fold was released on September 4.

== Specifications ==
=== Design ===
The Google Pixel 9 Pro Fold is a foldable smartphone, meaning it has a flexible display. This allows the phone to be either folded (in which case the display size is similar to that of a regular phone), or unfolded (in which case the display size is similar to that of a tablet).

The Google Pixel 9 Pro Fold features a redesigned appearance, with a taller and slimmer display compared to the previous generation Pixel Fold. It has been measured to be 1.5 mm thinner when closed, and 0.7 mm thinner when open compared to its predecessor.

The Pixel 9 Pro Fold comes in 2 colors: Porcelain (an ecru or off-white) and Obsidian (a dark charcoal gray). They are shown below:

Pixel 9 Pro Fold Smartphones
Front, folded	Front, unfolded	Back	Front, folded	Front, unfolded	Back
Porcelain			Obsidian		

=== Hardware ===
The Pixel 9 Pro Fold uses OLED displays on both the cover display, and the internal display. The cover display (used when the phone is folded) has a screen size of 6.3 in (16 cm), while the inner display (used when the phone is unfolded) has a screen size of 8 in (20.32 cm).

There are 3 rear-facing cameras:

- The 48 MP Quad PD wide angle camera, which has an ƒ/1.7 aperture, an 82° field of view, and a 1/2" image sensor size. The wide angle camera also allows for image stabilization.
- The 10.5 MP Dual PD autofocus ultra-wide camera, which has an ƒ/2.2 aperture, a 127° field of view, and a 1/3.4" image sensor size.
- The 10.8 MP Dual PD telephoto camera, which has an ƒ/3.1 aperture, a 23° field of view, and a 1/3.2" image sensor size. The telephoto lens allows for 5x optical zoom, Super Res Zoom up to 20x and image stabilization.

The Pixel 9 Pro Fold also has a 10 MP Dual PD front-facing (selfie) camera, which has an ƒ/2.2 aperture, and an 87° field of view. The specs for the front-facing cameras are the exact same both when the phone is folded and unfolded.

The Pixel 9 Pro Fold is powered by the fourth-generation of Google's Tensor series of chips (marketed as "Google Tensor G4"), as well as the Titan M2 security coprocessor. The Pixel 9 Pro Fold comes with a new modem, the Samsung Exynos Modem 5400. The new modem allows for better call quality, as well as the ability to connect to emergency services via satellite. Similar to the Emergency SOS feature released by Apple on the iPhone 14, this feature allows users to alert emergency services of danger through the use of satellites if the user is in a situation where they are unable to connect to Wi-Fi or a mobile network (such as if they get lost in a desert).

The Pixel 9 Pro Fold comes with 16 GB of RAM, and allows the user to choose between either 256 GB of storage (starting from US$1799) or 512 GB of storage (starting from US$1919).

The Pixel 9 Pro Fold has a 4650mAh battery, which, according to GSMarena's testing, is equivalent to 11 hours and 54 minutes of screen time (however, it's important to note that things like battery age and usage will affect battery life beyond what tests can show). It also has support for 45W fast charging, and supports Qi-certified wireless charging.

=== Software ===
The Google Pixel 9 Pro Fold shipped with many new artificial intelligence and Gemini features. These include updates such as Gemini Live (a conversational AI that is based on the existing Gemini chatbot), AI photo editing tools (such as Add Me - a tool that allows you to add the person taking the photo to a group picture), and Pixel Studio (a text-to-image AI photo generation tool that runs on-device and uses Google's image generation tool - Imagen 3). For a full list of new AI features, see the article 14 new things you can do with Pixel thanks to AI (It's important to note that the linked article was written by Google - the makers of the Pixel series of products including this phone).

At launch, the Google Pixel 9 Pro Fold shipped with Android 14. However, on the 15th of October 2024, the Pixel 9 Pro Fold, along with the other phones in the Pixel 9 series of products, received an update to Android 15 (in the form of a feature drop). Google has claimed that the Pixel 9 Pro fold will receive a total of 7 years of OS and security updates, meaning the phone will be supported until 2031.

GrapheneOS began officially supporting the Pixel 9, Pixel 9 Pro, and Pixel 9 Pro XL in August 2024, with full compatibility, shortly after the devices began shipping to consumers.

== Reception ==
Ahead of its expected release, The Verge's expressed excitement for prospective improvements to the original model's flaws.
