= Google Pixel =

Line of consumer electronic devices

- Developer: Google
- Manufacturer: Various
- Type: Smartphones; tablets; laptops
- Released: February 21, 2013; 13 years ago
- Operating system: Laptops: ChromeOS; Portables: Android; Wearables: WearOS
- Online services: Google Play (2015–present); Chrome Web Store (2013–present)
- Predecessor: Google Nexus
- Related: Googlebook
- Website: store.google.com

Google Pixel is a brand of portable consumer electronic devices developed by Google that runs the Pixel version of the Android operating system or the ChromeOS operating system. The primary line of Pixel products consists of Android-powered smartphones, produced since October 2016 as the replacement for the older Nexus line, with the current models being the Pixel 11, Pixel 11 Pro, Pixel 11 Pro XL, Pixel 11 Pro Fold, and Pixel 10a. The Pixel brand also includes laptop and tablet computers, as well as several accessories, and was originally introduced in February 2013 with the Chromebook Pixel.

== Phones ==
Legend:	Unsupported	Supported	Upcoming

Model	Announcement	Release		Support		Lifespan (Note: For unsupported devices, lifespan describes the time between initial release and final software update. For supported devices, it's the time elapsed from the initial release to the present date, in years and months.)
Model	Announcement	Date	Launch OS	Date	Final OS	Lifespan
Pixel / XL	October 4, 2016	October 20, 2016	7.1 Nougat	December 2, 2019	10	3 years, 1 month
Pixel 2 / XL	October 4, 2017	October 19, 2017	8.0 Oreo	December 7, 2020	11	3 years, 1 month
Pixel 3 / XL	October 9, 2018	October 18, 2018	9 Pie	June 6, 2022	12	3 years, 7 months
Pixel 3a / XL	May 7, 2019	May 15, 2019	9 Pie	September 5, 2022	12L	3 years, 3 months
Pixel 4 / XL	October 15, 2019	October 23, 2019	10	February 6, 2023	13	3 years, 3 months
Pixel 4a	August 3, 2020	August 20, 2020	10	November 6, 2023	13	3 years, 2 months
Pixel 4a (5G)	August 3, 2020	November 5, 2020	11	February 5, 2024	14	3 years, 3 months
Pixel 5	September 30, 2020	October 15, 2020	11	February 5, 2024	14	3 years, 3 months
Pixel 5a	August 17, 2021	August 26, 2021	11	November 4, 2024	14	3 years, 2 months
Pixel 6 / Pro	October 19, 2021	October 28, 2021	12	At least October 2026	—	5 years
Pixel 6a	May 11, 2022	July 21, 2022	12	At least July 2027	—	4 years, 3 months
Pixel 7 / Pro	October 6, 2022	October 13, 2022	13	At least October 2027	—	4 years
Pixel 7a	May 10, 2023	May 10, 2023	13	At least May 2028	—	3 years, 5 months
Pixel Fold	May 10, 2023	June 20, 2023	13	At least June 2028	—	3 years, 4 months
Pixel 8 / Pro	October 4, 2023	October 12, 2023	14	At least October 2030	—	3 years
Pixel 8a	May 7, 2024	May 14, 2024	14	At least May 2031	—	2 years, 5 months
Pixel 9 / Pro / Pro XL	August 13, 2024	August 22, 2024	14	At least August 2031	—	2 years, 2 months
Pixel 9 Pro Fold	August 13, 2024	September 4, 2024	14	At least September 2031	—	2 years, 2 months
Pixel 9a	March 19, 2025	April 10, 2025	15	At least March 2032	—	1 year, 6 months
Pixel 10	August 20, 2025	August 28, 2025	16	At least August 2032	—	1 year, 2 months
Pixel 10 Pro / Pro XL	August 20, 2025	August 28, 2025	16	At least August 2032	—	1 year, 2 months
Pixel 10 Pro Fold	August 20, 2025	October 9, 2025	16	At least October 2032	—	1 year, 1 month
Pixel 10a	February 18, 2026	March 5, 2026	16	At least February 2033	—	8 months
Pixel 11	August 12, 2026	August 20, 2026	17	At least August 2033	—	2 months
Pixel 11 Pro / Pro XL	August 12, 2026	August 20, 2026	17	At least August 2033	—	2 months
Pixel 11 Pro Fold	August 12, 2026	August 20, 2026	17	At least August 2033	—	2 months

=== Pixel and Pixel XL ===
Pixel and Pixel XL smartphones

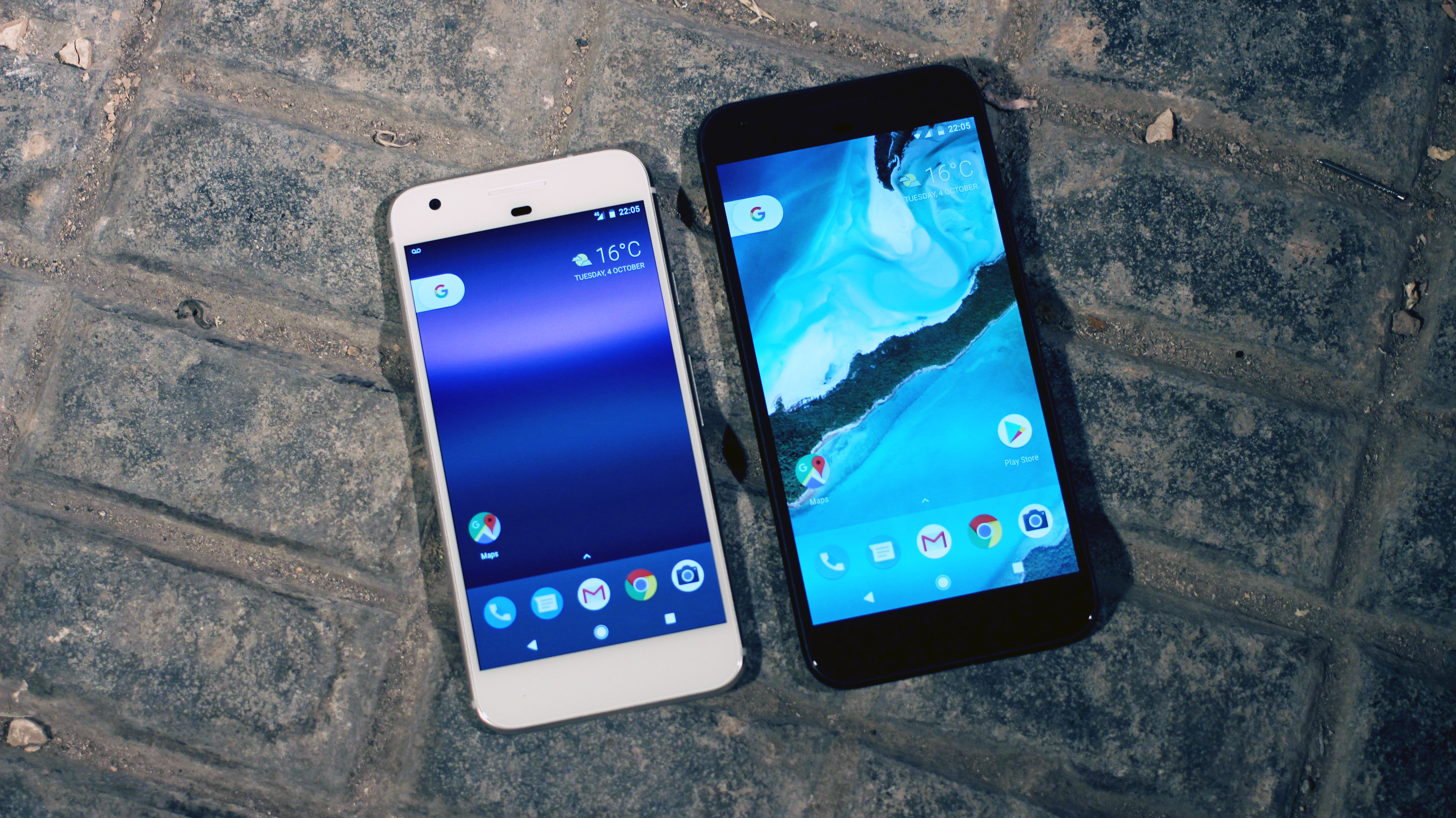
"Very Silver" and "Quite Black" Pixel smartphones

Google announced the first generation Pixel smartphones, the Pixel, and the Pixel XL, on October 4, 2016, during the #MadeByGoogle event. Google emphasized the camera on the two phones, which ranked as the best smartphone camera on DxOMarkMobile with 90 points until HTC released the U11, which also scored 90 points. This is largely due to software optimizations such as HDR+. The Pixel phones also include unlimited cloud storage for pictures on Google Photos and, for devices purchased directly from Google, an unlockable bootloader. In 2019, a class action lawsuit over faulty microphones in some devices enabled Pixel owners to claim up to $500 in compensation.

- Display: 5.0" 60 Hz AMOLED display with 1080×1920 pixel resolution (Pixel); 5.5" AMOLED 60 Hz display with 1440×2560 pixel resolution (Pixel XL)
- Processor: Qualcomm Snapdragon 821
- Storage: UFS 2.0 with 32 GB or 128 GB
- RAM: 4 GB LPDDR4
- Cameras: 12.3 MP rear camera Sony Exmor IMX378 sensor with f/2.0 lens and IR laser-assisted autofocus; 1.55 μm pixel size. 8 MP front camera with f/2.4 lens
- Headphone Jack
- Battery: 2,770 mAh (Pixel); 3,450 mAh (Pixel XL); both are non-removable and have fast charging
- Materials: Aluminum unibody design with hybrid coating; IP53 water and dust resistance
- Colors: Very Silver , Quite Black or Really Blue (Limited Edition)
- Operating system: Android 7.1 Nougat; upgradable to Android 10

=== Pixel 2 and 2 XL ===
Pixel 2 and Pixel 2 XL smartphones

Google announced the Pixel 2 series, consisting of the Pixel 2 and Pixel 2 XL, on October 4, 2017.

- Display: 5.0" AMOLED 60 Hz display with 1080×1920 pixel resolution (Pixel 2); 6" P-OLED 60 Hz display with 1440×2880 pixel resolution (Pixel 2 XL); Both displays have Corning Gorilla Glass 5
- Processor: Qualcomm Snapdragon 835
- Storage: UFS 2.1 with 64 GB or 128 GB
- RAM: 4 GB LPDDR4X
- Cameras: 12.2 MP rear camera Sony Exmor IMX362 with f/1.8 lens, IR laser-assisted autofocus, optical and electronic image stabilization; 8 MP front camera with f/2.4 lens
- Battery: 2,700 mAh (Pixel 2); 3,520 mAh (Pixel 2 XL); both are non-removable and have fast charging
- Materials: Aluminum unibody design with hybrid coating; IP67 water and dust resistance
- Colors: Just Black , Clearly White or Kinda Blue (Pixel 2); Just Black or Black and White (Pixel 2 XL)
- Operating system: Android 8.0 Oreo; upgradable to Android 11

=== Pixel 3 and 3 XL ===
Pixel 3 and Pixel 3 XL smartphones

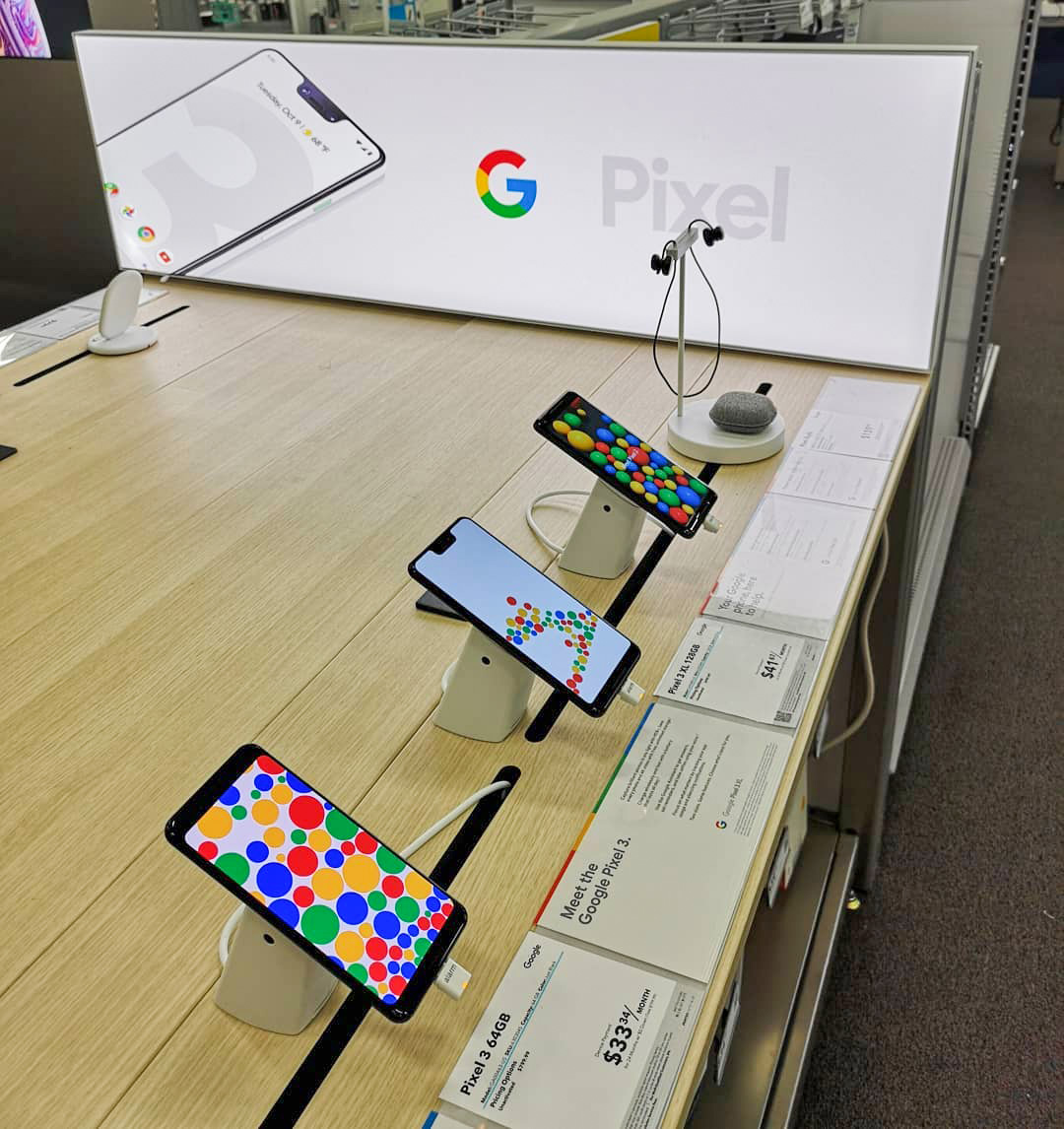
Pixel 3 and Pixel 3 XL on retail display with Pixel Buds and wireless charging accessories

Google announced the Pixel 3 and Pixel 3 XL at an event on October 9, 2018, alongside several other products.

- Display: Pixel 3 5.5" OLED, 60 Hz, 2160×1080 (18:9) pixel resolution; Pixel 3 XL 6.3" OLED, 60 Hz, 2960×1440 (18.5:9) pixel resolution; both displays have Corning Gorilla Glass 5.
- Processor: Qualcomm Snapdragon 845
- Storage: UFS 2.1 with 64 GB or 128 GB
- RAM: 4 GB LPDDR4X
- Cameras: 12.2 MP rear camera Sony Exmor IMX363 with f/1.8 lens, IR laser-assisted autofocus, optical and electronic image stabilization; 8 MP front camera with f/1.8 lens and 75° lens, second front camera with 8 MP, f/2.2, fixed focus and 97° lens; stereo audio added to video recording
- Battery: 2,915 mAh (Pixel 3); 3,430 mAh (Pixel 3 XL); both are non-removable and have fast charging and wireless charging
- Materials: Aluminum frame, matte glass back, IP68 water and dust resistance
- Colors: Just Black , Clearly White , and Not Pink
- Operating system: Android 9.0 Pie; upgradable to Android 12

=== Pixel 3a and 3a XL ===
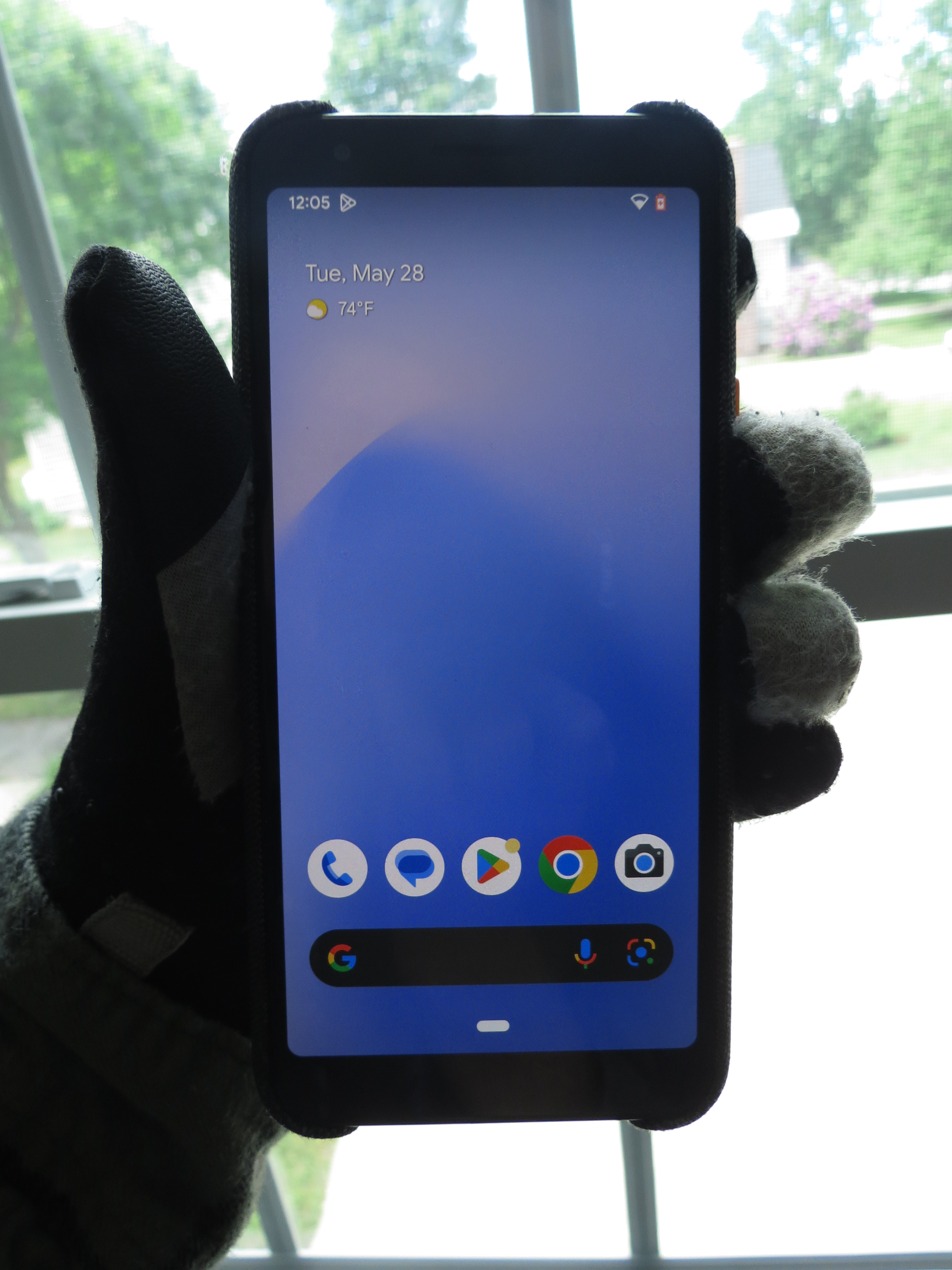
Google Pixel 3a running Android 12

On May 7, at I/O 2019, Google announced the Pixel 3a and Pixel 3a XL, budget alternatives to the original two Pixel 3 devices.

- Display: Pixel 3a 5.6" OLED, 60 Hz, 2220×1080 (18.5:9) pixel resolution; Pixel 3a XL 6" OLED, 60 Hz, 2160×1080 (18:9) pixel resolution; both displays have Asahi Dragontrail Glass
- Processor: Qualcomm Snapdragon 670
- Storage: 64 GB
- RAM: 4 GB LPDDR4X
- Cameras: 12.2 MP rear camera with f/1.8 lens, IR laser-assisted autofocus, optical and electronic image stabilization; 8 MP front camera with f/2.0 lens and 84° lens
- Headphone Jack
- Battery: 3,000 mAh (Pixel 3a); 3700 mAh (Pixel 3a XL); both are non-removable and have fast charging, but no wireless charging
- Materials: Polycarbonate body
- Colors: Just Black , Clearly White and Purple-ish
- Operating system: Android 9, upgradable to Android 12

=== Pixel 4 and 4 XL ===
Google announced the Pixel 4 and Pixel 4 XL at an event on October 15, 2019, alongside several other products.

- Display: Pixel 4 5.7" OLED, 90 Hz, 2280×1080 (19:9) pixel resolution; Pixel 4 XL 6.3" OLED, 90 Hz, 3040×1440 (19:9) pixel resolution; both displays have Corning Gorilla Glass 5.
- Processor: Qualcomm Snapdragon 855
- Storage: 64 GB or 128 GB
- RAM: 6 GB LPDDR4X
- Cameras: 12.2 MP sensor with f/1.8 lens and 16 MP telephoto sensor with f/2.4 lens, IR laser-assisted autofocus, optical and electronic image stabilization; 8 MP front camera with f/2.0 lens and 90° lens
- Battery: 2,800 mAh (Pixel 4); 3,700 mAh (Pixel 4 XL); both are non-removable and have fast charging and wireless charging
- Materials: Aluminum frame, matte or glossy glass back, IP68 water and dust resistance
- Colors: Just Black , Clearly White and Oh So Orange
- Operating system: Android 10, upgradable to Android 13

In 2019, Google offered a bug bounty program of up to $1.5 million for the Titan M security chip built into Pixel 3, Pixel 3a and Pixel 4.

=== Pixel 4a and 4a (5G) ===
Google announced the Pixel 4a on August 3, 2020, and the Pixel 4a (5G) on September 30, 2020, as budget alternatives to the original two Pixel 4 devices.

- Display: 5.8" OLED (4a) 6.2" OLED (4a 5G), 60 Hz, 2340×1080 (19.5:9) pixel resolution; the display uses Corning Gorilla Glass 3. Both have a hole punch for the front camera.
- Processor: Qualcomm Snapdragon 730G (4a); Qualcomm Snapdragon 765G (4a 5G)
- Storage: 128 GB
- RAM: 6 GB LPDDR4X
- Camera: 12.2 MP dual-pixel sensor with f/1.7 lens, autofocus with dual-pixel phase detection, optical and electrical image stabilization. In addition, the 4a 5G has a 16 MP ultrawide sensor with f/2.2 lens. Both have an 8 MP front camera with f/2.0 lens.
- Battery: 3,140 mAh (4a); Typical - 3,885 mAh, Minimum - 3,800 mAh (4a 5G); both are non-removable and feature all day battery as well as fast charging
- 3.5 mm headset jack
- Materials: Polycarbonate body
- Colors: Just Black or Barely Blue (Limited Edition) (Pixel 4a); Just Black or Clearly White (Pixel 4a 5G)
- Operating System: Android 10, upgradable to Android 13 (4a); Android 11 (4a 5G), upgradable to Android 14

=== Pixel 5 ===
Google announced the Pixel 5 on September 30, 2020.

- Display: 6.0" OLED, 90 Hz, 2340×1080 (19.5:9) pixel resolution; the display uses Corning Gorilla Glass 6.
- Processor: Qualcomm Snapdragon 765G
- Storage: 128 GB
- RAM: 8 GB LPDDR4X
- Camera: 12.2 MP sensor with f/1.7 lens and 16 MP ultrawide sensor with f/2.2 lens, autofocus with dual-pixel phase detection, optical and electrical image stabilization; 8 MP front camera with f/2.0 lens.
- Battery: 4,080 mAh; it is non-removable and features fast charging and wireless charging, all day battery, and Battery Share.
- Materials: Brushed aluminum body, IP68 water and dust resistance
- Colors: Just Black and Sorta Sage
- Operating System: Android 11, upgradable to Android 14

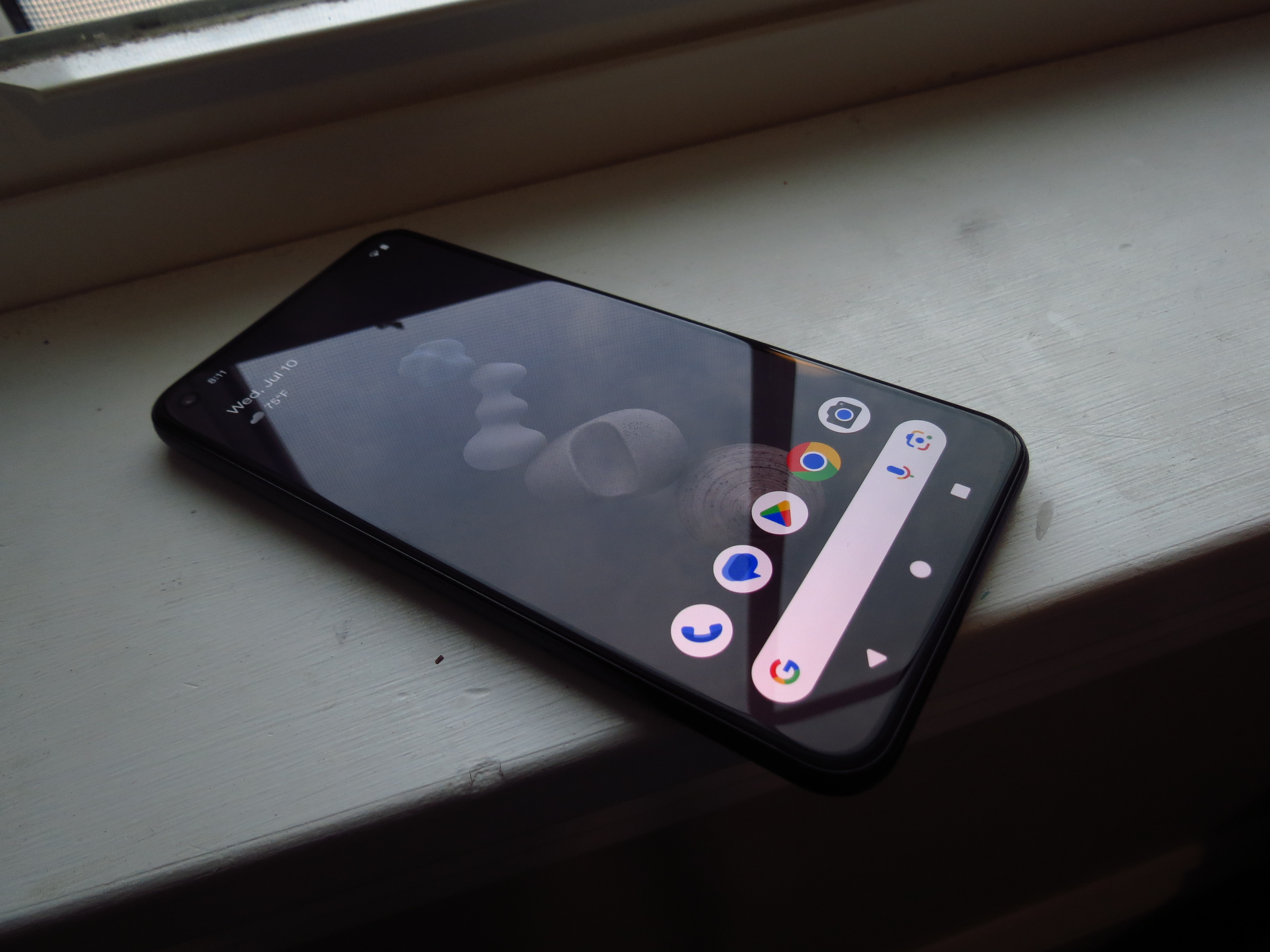
Google Pixel 5 running Android 14

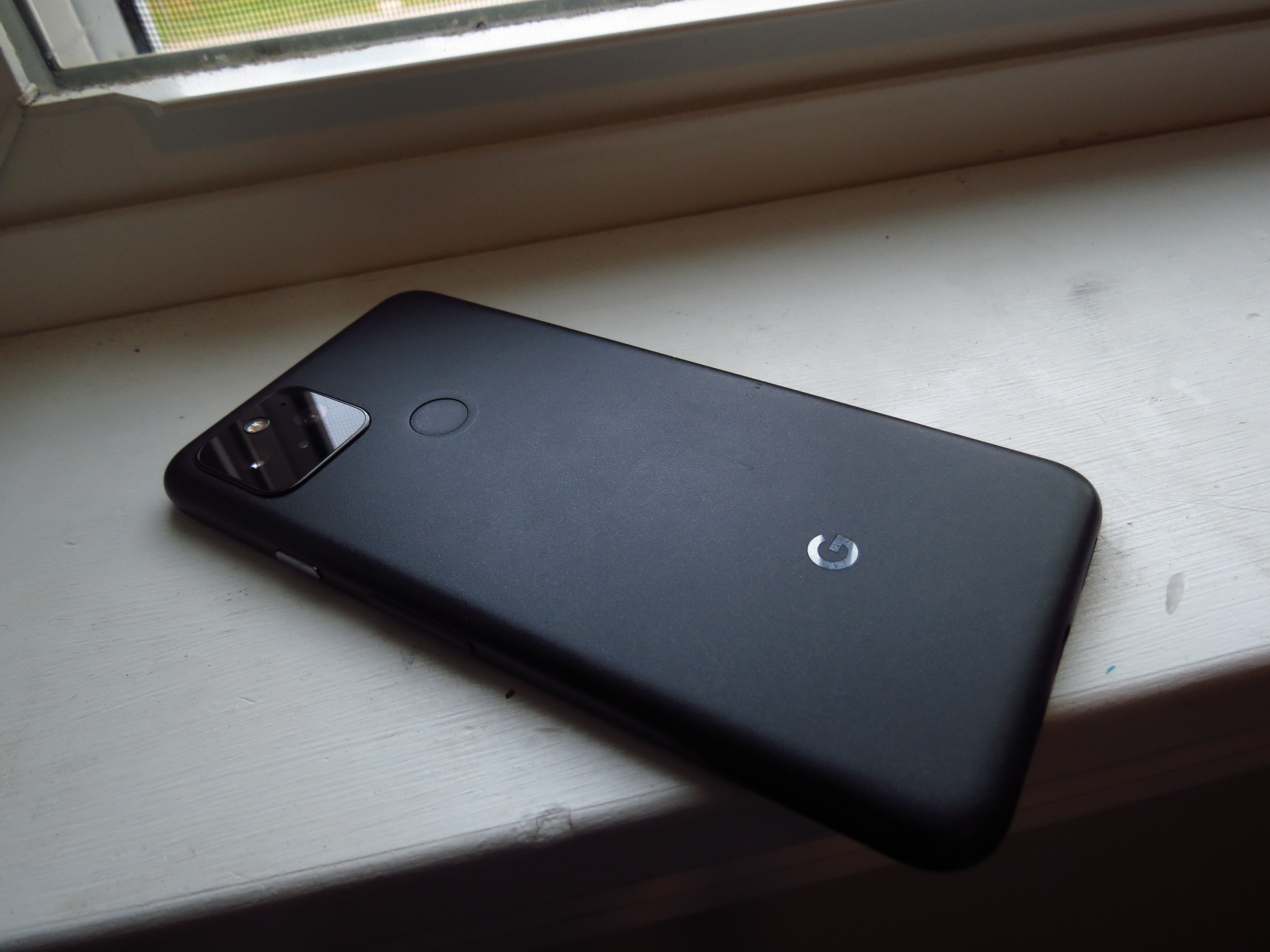
Google Pixel 5 back in Just Black

=== Pixel 5a ===
Google announced the Pixel 5a on August 17, 2021.

- Display: 6.34" OLED, 60 Hz, 2400×1080 (20:9) pixel resolution; the display uses Corning Gorilla Glass 3. It has a hole punch for the front camera.
- Processor: Qualcomm Snapdragon 765G
- Storage: 128 GB
- RAM: 6 GB LPDDR4X
- Camera: 12.2 MP sensor with f/1.7 lens and 16 MP ultrawide sensor with f/2.2 lens, autofocus with dual-pixel phase detection, optical and electrical image stabilization; 8 MP front camera with f/2.0 lens.
- Battery: 4,680 mAh; non-removable and features all day battery as well as fast charging
- Materials: Brushed aluminum body, IP67 water and dust resistance
- Colors: Mostly Black
- Operating System: Android 11, upgradable to Android 14

=== Pixel 6 and 6 Pro ===
Google announced the Pixel 6 and Pixel 6 Pro on October 19, 2021.

- Display: Pixel 6 6.4" OLED, 90 Hz, 2400×1080 FHD+ pixel resolution; Pixel 6 Pro 6.7" LTPO OLED, 120 Hz, 3120×1440 QHD+ pixel resolution; both have Corning Gorilla Glass Victus.
- Processor: Google Tensor
- Storage: Pixel 6 128 or 256 GB; Pixel 6 Pro 128, 256, or 512 GB
- RAM: 8 GB LPDDR5 (Pixel 6); 12 GB LPDDR5 (Pixel 6 Pro)
- Cameras:
  - Pixel 6: Rear 50 MP sensor with f/1.85 lens, laser detect autofocus, optical image stabilization; Rear 12 MP ultrawide sensor with f/2.2 lens; Front 8 MP sensor with f/2.0 lens and 84° field of view;
  - Pixel 6 Pro: Rear 50 MP sensor with f/1.85 lens, laser detect autofocus, optical image stabilization; Rear 12 MP ultrawide sensor with f/2.2 lens; Rear 48 MP telephoto sensor with f/3.5 lens; Front 11.1 MP front camera with f/2.2 lens and 94° field of view.
- Battery: 4,614 mAh (Pixel 6); 5,003 mAh (Pixel 6 Pro); both are non-removable and have fast charging, wireless charging and reverse wireless charging
- Materials: Aluminum frame, glass back, IP68 water and dust resistance
- Colors: Pixel 6 Stormy Black , Kinda Coral and Sorta Seafoam ; Pixel 6 Pro Stormy Black , Cloudy White and Sorta Sunny
- Operating system: Android 12, upgradable to Android 16, with minimum 5 years of major OS/security update support.

=== Pixel 6a ===
Google announced the Pixel 6a on May 11, 2022.

- Display: 6.1" OLED, 60 Hz, 2400×1080 (20:9) pixel resolution; the display uses Corning Gorilla Glass 3. It has a hole punch for the front camera.
- Processor: Google Tensor
- Storage: 128 GB
- RAM: 6 GB LPDDR5
- Camera: 12.2 MP sensor with f/1.7 lens and 12 MP ultrawide sensor with f/2.2 lens, autofocus with dual-pixel phase detection, optical and electrical image stabilization; 8 MP front camera with f/2.0 lens.
- Battery: 4,410 mAh; non-removable battery with 18 W charging
- Materials: Aluminum frame, plastic back, IP67 water and dust resistance
- Colors: Charcoal , Chalk and Sage
- Operating System: Android 12, upgradable to Android 16, with minimum 5 years of major OS/security update support.

=== Pixel 7 and 7 Pro ===
Google announced the Pixel 7 and Pixel 7 Pro on October 6, 2022.

- Display: Pixel 7 6.3" OLED, 90 Hz, 2400×1080 FHD+ pixel resolution; Pixel 7 Pro 6.7" LTPO OLED, 120 Hz, 3120×1440 QHD+ pixel resolution; both have Corning Gorilla Glass Victus.
- Processor: Google Tensor G2
- Storage: Pixel 7 128 or 256 GB; Pixel 7 Pro 128, 256, or 512 GB
- RAM: 8 GB LPDDR5 (Pixel 7); 12 GB LPDDR5 (Pixel 7 Pro)
- Cameras: Pixel 7 Rear 50 MP sensor with f/1.85 lens and 12 MP ultrawide sensor with f/2.2 lens, front 8 MP sensor with f/2.2 lens and 92.8° field of view; Pixel 7 Pro Rear 50 MP sensor with f/1.85 lens, 12 MP ultrawide sensor with f/2.2 lens and 48 MP telephoto sensor with f/3.5 lens, front 11.1 MP sensor with f/2.2 lens and 92.8° field of view; Laser detect autofocus, optical image stabilization.
- Battery: 4,355 mAh (Pixel 7); 5,000 mAh (Pixel 7 Pro); both are non-removable and have fast charging, wireless charging and reverse-wireless charging
- Materials: Aluminum frame, glass back, IP68 water and dust resistance
- Colors: Pixel 7 Obsidian , Snow and Lemongrass ; Pixel 7 Pro Obsidian , Snow and Hazel
- Operating system: Android 13, with minimum 5 years of major OS/security update support.

=== Pixel 7a ===
Google announced the Pixel 7a at its annual Google I/O on May 10, 2023.

- Display: 6.1" FHD OLED (2400×1080, 429 ppi) 90 Hz, and has Corning Gorilla Glass 3
- Processor: Google Tensor G2
- Storage: 128 GB
- Memory: 8 GB
- Camera: Rear 64 MP (f/1.89) main; 13 MP (f/2.2) (ultrawide); Front 13 MP (f/2.2)
- Battery: Non-removable 4385 mAh battery, with 18 W fast charging and 7.5 W Qi wireless charging
- Materials: Aluminum frame, plastic back, IP67 dust/water-resistant
- Colors: Charcoal , Sea , Snow and Coral
- Operating System: Android 13

=== Pixel Fold ===
Google announced the Pixel Fold at its annual Google I/O on May 10, 2023.

- Display: 5.8-inch FHD OLED (1080×2092, 408 PPI) 120 Hz with Corning Gorilla Glass Victus [External Cover Display]; 7.6" OLED (2208×1840, 380 ppi) 120 Hz [Internal Folding Display]
- Processor: Google Tensor G2
- Storage: 256 or 512 GB
- RAM: 12 GB LPDDR5
- Camera: Rear 48 MP (f/1.7) main, 10.8 MP (f/2.2) ultrawide, 10.8 MP (f/3.05) telephoto; Front 9.5 MP (f/2.2); Inner 8 MP (f/2.0)
- Battery: Non-removable 4821 mAh (typical) battery with Qi-certified wireless charging
- Materials: Aluminum frame, Stainless-steel hinge, Corning Gorilla Glass Victus Back, IPX8 water resistance
- Colors: Obsidian and Porcelain
- Operating System: Android 13

=== Pixel 8 and 8 Pro ===
Pixel 8 and Pixel 8 Pro smartphones

Google announced the Pixel 8 and 8 Pro at a #MadeByGoogle event on October 4, 2023. They were released 8 days later on October 12, 2023.

- Display: Pixel 8: 6.2-inch OLED (1080×2400, 20:9, 428 ppi) Smooth display 60 HZ — 120 HZ; Pixel 8 Pro: 6.7" OLED (1344×2992, 20:9, 489 ppi) Smooth display 1 HZ — 120 HZ
- Processor: Google Tensor G3
- Storage: Pixel 8: 128 GB / 256 GB UFS 3.1; Pixel 8 Pro: 128 GB / 256 GB / 512 GB / 1 TB UFS 3.1
- Memory: Pixel 8: 8 GB LPDDR5X RAM; Pixel 8 Pro: 12 GB LPDDR5X RAM
- Camera: Pixel 8: Rear 50 MP Octa PD (f/1.68) main; 12 MP (f/2.2) ultrawide; Front 10.5 MP (f/2.2); Pixel 8 Pro: Rear 50 MP Octa PD (f/1.68) main; 48 MP Quad PD (f/1.95) ultrawide; 48 MP Quad PD (f/2.8) telephoto;Front 10.5 MP Dual PD (f/2.2)
- Battery: Pixel 8: Non-removable 4575 mAh battery, with fast and wireless charging; Pixel 8 Pro: Non-removable 5050 mAh battery, with fast and wireless charging
- Materials: Pixel 8: Aluminum housing & frame, scratch-resistant Corning Gorilla Glass Victus cover glass, glass back; Pixel 8 Pro: Aluminum housing & frame, scratch-resistant Corning Gorilla Glass Victus 2 cover glass, glass back
- Colors: Mint , Obsidian , Hazel (Pixel 8 only), Rose (Pixel 8 only), Bay (Pixel 8 Pro only), and Porcelain (Pixel 8 Pro only)
- Operating System: Android 14, with 7 years of OS/security updates for both

=== Pixel 8a ===
The Pixel 8a is a mid-range addition to the Pixel 8 series. It was announced on the Made by Google blog on May 7, 2024.

- Display: 6.1" OLED (1080×2400, 20:9, 430 ppi) Smooth display 60 HZ - 120 HZ
- Processor: Google Tensor G3
- Storage: 128 GB / 256 GB UFS 3.1
- Memory: 8 GB LPDDR5X RAM
- Camera: Rear 64 MP Octa PD (f/1.89) main; 13 MP (f/2.2) ultrawide; Front 13 MP (f/2.2)
- Battery: Non-removable 4492 mAh battery, with 18 W fast charging and 7.5 W Qi wireless charging
- Materials: Aluminum frame, scratch-resistant Corning Gorilla Glass 3 cover glass, plastic back, IP67 dust/water-resistant
- Colors: Aloe , Bay , Porcelain , Obsidian
- Operating System: Android 14, with 7 years of OS/security updates

=== Pixel 9 ===
Google announced the Pixel 9 at the Made by Google event, along with the Pixel 9 Pro, Pixel 9 Pro XL, and Pixel 9 Pro Fold on August 13, 2024.

- Display: 6.3" Actua (1080×2424 OLED, 20:9, 422 ppi) Smooth display 60–120 Hz
- Processor: Google Tensor G4
- Storage: 128 GB / 256 GB UFS 3.1
- Memory: 12 GB LPDDR5X RAM
- Camera: Rear 50 MP Octa PD (f/1.68) main; 48 MP Quad PD (f/1.7) ultrawide; Front 10.5 MP (f/2.2)
- Battery: 4558 mAh battery, with fast and wireless charging
- Materials: 100% recycled aluminum frame, scratch-resistant Corning Gorilla Glass Victus 2 cover glass, Corning Gorilla Glass Victus 2 polished back with satin finish metal frame, IP68 dust/water-resistant
- Colors: Peony , Wintergreen , Porcelain , Obsidian
- Operating System: Android 14, with 7 years of OS/security updates

=== Pixel 9 Pro & Pro XL ===
Google announced the Pixel 9 Pro and Pixel 9 Pro XL at the Made by Google event, alongside the Pixel 9 and the Pixel 9 Pro Fold on August 13, 2024.

- Display: 6.3" Super Actua (LTPO) display (1280×2856, 20:9, 495 ppi) Smooth display 1–120 Hz (Pro); 6.8" Super Actua (LTPO) display (1344×2992, 20:9, 486 ppi) Smooth display 1–120 Hz (Pro XL)
- Processor: Google Tensor G4
- Storage: 128 GB / 256 GB / 512 GB / 1 TB UFS 3.1
- Memory: 16 GB LPDDR5X RAM
- Camera: Rear 50 MP Octa PD (f/1.68) main; 48 MP Quad PD ultrawide (f/1.7); 48 MP Quad PD telephoto (f/2.8); 42 MP Dual PD selfie (f/2.2)
- Battery: 4558 mAh (Pro) and 4942 mAh (Pro XL) batteries, both with fast and wireless charging
- Materials: 100% recycled aluminum frame, scratch-resistant Corning Gorilla Glass Victus 2 cover glass, Corning Gorilla Glass Victus 2 silky matte back with polished finish metal frame, IP68 dust/water-resistant
- Colors: Rose Quartz , Porcelain , Hazel , Obsidian
- Operating System: Android 14, with 7 years of OS/security updates

=== Pixel 9 Pro Fold ===
Google announced the Pixel 9 Pro Fold at the Made by Google event, alongside the Pixel 9 and the Pixel 9 Pro on August 13, 2024.

- Display (External Cover): 6.3" Actua display (1080×2424, 20:9, 422 PPI) Smooth Display (60–120 Hz)
- Display (Internal Folding): 8" Super Actua Flex (LTPO) display (2076×2152, 373 PPI) Smooth Display (1–120 Hz)
- Processor: Google Tensor G4
- Storage: 256 GB / 512 GB / UFS 3.1
- Memory: 16 GB LPDDR5X RAM
- Rear Camera: 48 MP Quad PD (f/1.7) main; 10.5 MP Dual PD ultrawide (f/2.2); 10.8 MP Dual PD telephoto (f/3.1)
- Front & Inner Camera: 10 MP Dual PD (f/2.2)
- Battery: 4560 mAh, with fast and wireless charging
- Materials: 100% recycled aluminum frame, scratch-resistant Corning Gorilla Glass Victus 2 cover glass, Corning Gorilla Glass Victus 2 silky matte back with polished finish metal frame, IPX8 water-resistant
- Colors: Porcelain and Obsidian
- Operating System: Android 14, with 7 years of OS/security updates

=== Pixel 9a ===
The Pixel 9a is a mid-range variant of the Pixel 9 series. It was announced on March 19, 2025, through a Google blog post.

- Display: 6.3" OLED (1080×2424, 20:9, 422.2 ppi) Smooth display (60–120 Hz)
- Processor: Google Tensor G4
- Storage: 128 GB / 256 GB UFS 3.1
- Memory: 8 GB LPDDR5X RAM
- Camera: Rear 48 MP Quad PD (f/1.7) main; 13 MP (f/2.2) ultrawide; Front 13 MP (f/2.2)
- Battery: 5100 mAh battery, with 23 W fast charging and 7.5 W Qi wireless charging
- Materials: 100% recycled aluminum frame, scratch-resistant Corning Gorilla Glass 3 cover glass, plastic back, IP68 dust/water-resistant
- Colors: Iris , Peony , Porcelain , Obsidian
- Operating System: Android 15, with 7 years of OS/security updates

=== Pixel 10 ===
Google launched the Pixel 10 at the 2025 Made by Google event, alongside the Pixel 10 Pro, Pixel 10 Pro XL and Pixel 10 Pro Fold.

- Display: 6.3" Actua display (1080×2424, 20:9, OLED, 422 ppi) Smooth Display (60–120 Hz)
- Processor: Google Tensor G5
- Storage: 128 GB / 256 GB
- Memory: 12 GB
- Camera: Rear 48 MP Quad PD main (f/1.7), 13 MP Quad PD ultrawide (f/1.7), 10.8 MP Dual PD telephoto (f/1.3); Front 10.5 MP Dual PD selfie (f/2.2)
- Battery: 4970 mAh battery with fast charging and Qi2-certified wireless charging
- Materials: 100% recycled aluminum frame, scratch-resistant Corning Gorilla Glass Victus 2 cover glass, glass back, IP68 dust/water-resistant
- Colors: Indigo , Frost , Lemongrass , Obsidian
- Operating system: Android 16, with 7 years of OS/security updates

=== Pixel 10 Pro & Pro XL ===
Google launched the Pixel 10 Pro and the Pixel 10 Pro XL at the 2025 Made by Google event, alongside the Pixel 10 and the Pixel 10 Pro Fold.

- Display: 6.3" Super Actua display (1280×2856, 20:9, LTPO OLED, 495 ppi) Smooth Display (1–120 Hz) (Pro); 6.8" Super Actua display (1344×2992, 20:9, LTPO OLED, 486 ppi) Smooth Display (1–120 Hz) (Pro XL)
- Processor: Google Tensor G5
- Storage: 128 GB (Pro only); 256 GB / 512 GB / 1 TB (Pro & Pro XL)
- Memory: 16 GB
- Camera: Rear 50 MP Octa PD wide (f/1.68), 48 MP Quad PD ultrawide (f/1.7), 48 MP Quad PD telephoto (f/2.8); Front 42 MP Dual PD selfie (f/2.2)
- Battery: 4870 mAh battery with 30 W fast charging and 15 W Qi2-certified wireless charging (Pro); 5200mAh battery with 45W fast charging and 25W Qi2-certified wireless charging (Pro XL)
- Materials: 100% recycled aluminum frame, scratch-resistant Corning Gorilla Glass Victus 2 cover glass, glass back, IP68 dust/water-resistant
- Colors: Moonstone , Jade , Porcelain , Obsidian
- Operating system: Android 16, with 7 years of OS/security updates

=== Pixel 10 Pro Fold ===
Google launched the Pixel 10 Pro Fold at the 2025 Made by Google event, alongside the Pixel 10, Pixel 10 Pro, and Pixel 10 Pro XL.

- Display (External Cover): 6.4" Actua display (1080×2364, 20:9, OLED, 408 ppi) Smooth Display (60–120 Hz)
- Display (Inner Folding): 8" Super Actua Flex display (2076×2152, OLED, 373 PPI) Smooth Display (1–120 Hz)
- Processor: Google Tensor G5
- Storage: 256 GB / 512 GB / 1 TB
- Memory: 16 GB
- Camera: Rear 48 MP Quad PD main (f/1.7), 10.8 MP Dual PD ultrawide (f/2.2), 10.8 MP Dual PD telephoto (f/3.1); Inner 10 MP Dual PD (f/2.2); Front 10 MP Dual PD selfie (f/2.2)
- Battery: 5015 mAh battery with 30 W fast charging and 15 W Qi2-certified wireless charging
- Materials: 100% recycled aluminum frame, scratch-resistant Corning Gorilla Glass Victus 2 cover glass, glass back, IP68 dust/water-resistant
- Colors: Moonstone , Jade
- Operating system: Android 16, with 7 years of OS/security updates

=== Pixel 10a ===
Google announced the Pixel 10a through a blog post on February 18, 2026. It serves as a mid-range variant of the Pixel 10 series.

- Display: 6.3" OLED (1080×2424, 20:9, 422.2 ppi) Smooth display (60–120 Hz)
- Processor: Google Tensor G4
- Storage: 128 GB / 256 GB UFS 3.1
- Memory: 8 GB LPDDR5X RAM
- Camera: Rear 48 MP Quad PD (f/1.7) main; 13 MP (f/2.2) ultrawide; Front 13 MP (f/2.2)
- Battery: 5100 mAh battery, with 30 W fast charging and 10 W Qi wireless charging
- Materials: 100% recycled aluminum frame, scratch-resistant Corning Gorilla Glass 7i cover glass, plastic back, IP68 dust/water-resistant
- Colors: Lavender , Berry , Fog , Obsidian
- Operating System: Android 16, with 7 years of OS/security updates

=== Pixel 11 ===
Google launched the Pixel 11 at the 2026 Made by Google event, alongside the Pixel 11 Pro, Pixel 11 Pro XL and Pixel 11 Pro Fold.

- Display: 6.3" Actua display (1080×2424, 20:9, OLED, 422 ppi) Smooth Display (60–120 Hz)
- Processor: Google Tensor G6
- Storage: 256 GB
- Memory: 12 GB
- Camera: Rear 48 MP Quad PD main (f/1.7), 13 MP Quad PD ultrawide (f/1.7), 10.8 MP Dual PD telephoto (f/1.3); Front 10.5 MP Dual PD selfie (f/2.2)
- Battery: 4985 mAh battery with fast charging and 25W Qi2.2-certified wireless charging
- Materials: 100% recycled aluminum frame, scratch-resistant Corning Gorilla Glass Victus 2 cover glass, glass back, IP68 dust/water-resistant
- Colors: Hibiscus , Frost , Pistachio , Obsidian
- Operating system: Android 17, with 7 years of OS/security updates

=== Pixel 11 Pro & Pro XL ===
Google announced the Pixel 11 Pro and the Pixel 11 Pro XL at the 2026 Made by Google event, alongside the Pixel 11 and the Pixel 11 Pro Fold.

- Display: 6.3" Super Actua display (1280×2856, 20:9, LTPO OLED, 495 ppi) Smooth Display (1–120 Hz) (Pro); 6.8" Super Actua display (1344×2992, 20:9, LTPO OLED, 486 ppi) Smooth Display (1–120 Hz) (Pro XL)
- Processor: Google Tensor G6
- Storage: 256 GB / 512 GB / 1 TB
- Memory: 12 GB (256GB version) / 16GB (512GB, 1TB versions)
- Camera: Rear 50 MP Octa PD wide (f/1.68), 48 MP Quad PD ultrawide (f/1.7), 48 MP Quad PD telephoto (f/2.8); Front 42 MP Dual PD selfie (f/2.2)
- Battery: 4850 mAh battery (Pro) / 5115 mAh battery (Pro XL); 30 W fast charging (Pro) / 45W fast charging (Pro XL), and 25 W Qi2.2-certified wireless charging (Both)
- Materials: 100% recycled aluminum frame, scratch-resistant Corning Gorilla Glass Victus 2 cover glass, glass back, IP68 dust/water-resistant
- Colors: Canyon , Olive , Fog , Obsidian (matte)
- Operating system: Android 17, with 7 years of OS/security updates

=== Pixel 11 Pro Fold ===
Google launched the Pixel 10 Pro Fold at the 2026 Made by Google event, alongside the Pixel 11, Pixel 11 Pro, and Pixel 11 Pro XL.

- Display (External Cover): 6.5" Actua display (1080×2342, 20:9, OLED, 399 ppi) Smooth Display (1–120 Hz)
- Display (Inner Folding): 8" Super Actua Flex display (2076×2152, OLED, 372 PPI) Smooth Display (1–120 Hz)
- Processor: Google Tensor G6
- Storage: 256 GB / 512 GB / 1 TB
- Memory: 16 GB
- Camera: Rear 48 MP Quad PD main (f/1.7), 10.8 MP Dual PD ultrawide (f/2.2), 10.8 MP Dual PD telephoto (f/3.1); Inner 10 MP Dual PD (f/2.2); Front 10 MP Dual PD selfie (f/2.2)
- Battery: 4806 mAh battery with 30 W fast charging and 25 W Qi2.2-certified wireless charging
- Materials: 100% recycled aluminum frame, scratch-resistant Corning Gorilla Glass Victus 2 cover glass, fiberglass composite back, IP68 dust/water-resistant
- Colors: Olive , Obsidian
- Operating system: Android 17, with 7 years of OS/security updates

== Tablets ==
=== Pixel C ===
The Pixel C was announced by Google at an event on September 29, 2015, alongside the Nexus 5X and Nexus 6P phones (among other products). The Pixel C includes a USB-C port and a 3.5 mm headphone jack. The device shipped with Android 6.0.1 Marshmallow, and later received Android 7.x Nougat and Android 8.x Oreo. Google stopped selling the Pixel C in December 2017.

- Display: 10.2" display with 2560×1800 pixel resolution
- Processor: NVIDIA Tegra X1
- Storage: 32 or 64 GB
- RAM: 3 GB
- Cameras: 8 MP rear camera; 2 MP front camera
- Battery: 9000 mAh (non-removable)

=== Pixel Slate ===
The Pixel Slate, a 12.3 in (31 cm) 2-in-1 tablet and laptop, was announced by Google in New York City on October 9, 2018, alongside the Pixel 3 and 3 XL. The Pixel Slate includes two USB-C ports but omits the headphone jack. The device runs ChromeOS on Intel Kaby Lake processors, with options ranging from a Celeron on the low end to an i7 on the high end. In June 2019, Google announced it would not further develop the product line and canceled two models that were under development.

=== Pixel Tablet ===
The Pixel Tablet was announced by Google at I/O 2022. It comes with a stand, similar to that of a Home Hub; however, it is detachable. It was released on June 20, 2023.

- Display: 10.95-inch LCD (2560×1600, 16:10 aspect ratio), 60 Hz, 500 nits
- Processor: Google Tensor G2
- Storage: 128 GB or 256 GB; are non-expandable
- Memory: 8 GB LPDDR5 RAM
- Camera: Rear and front: 8 MP (ƒ/2.0, 1/4" sensor, 1.12 μm, 84° FoV) fixed-focus
- Battery: Non-removable 7,020 mAh; charges at 15 W, both wired and through the dock; No wireless charging supported.
- Materials: Aluminium frame, nano ceramic back, no water/dust resistance
- Colors: Hazel , Porcelain and Rose ; not available in certain areas.
- Operating system: Android 13 with Pixel UI, at least 3 years of software updates and 5 years of security updates

== Laptops ==
=== Chromebook Pixel (2013) ===
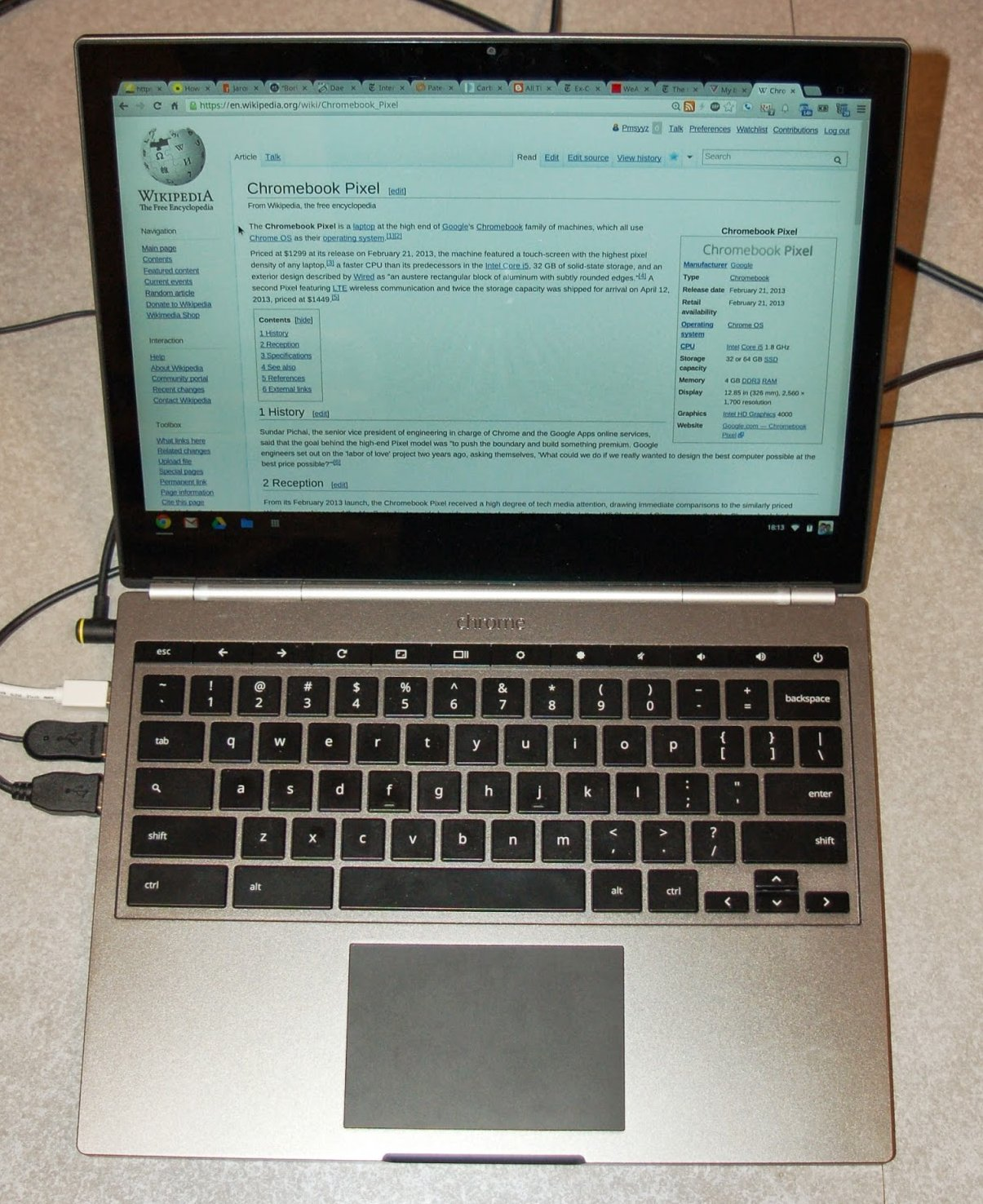
Chromebook Pixel (2013)

Google announced the first-generation Chromebook Pixel in a blog post on February 21, 2013. The laptop includes an SD/multi-card reader, Mini DisplayPort, a combination headphone/microphone jack, and two USB 2.0 ports. Some of the device's other features include a backlit keyboard, a "fully clickable etched glass touchpad," integrated stereo speakers, and two built-in microphones.

- Display: 12.85" display with 2560×1700 pixel resolution
- Processor: 3rd generation (Ivy Bridge) Intel Core i5 processor
- Storage: 32 GB internal storage and 1 TB Google Drive storage for 3 years
- RAM: 4 GB
- Battery: 59 Wh

=== Chromebook Pixel (2015) ===
On March 11, 2015, Google announced the second generation of the Chromebook Pixel in a blog post. The laptop includes two USB-C ports, two USB 3.0 ports, an SD card slot, and a combination headphone/microphone jack. The device also has a backlit keyboard, a "multi-touch, clickable glass touchpad," built-in stereo speakers, and two built-in microphones, among other features.

Google discontinued the 2015 Chromebook Pixel on August 29, 2016.

- Display: 12.85" display with 2560×1700 pixel resolution
- Processor: 5th generation (Broadwell) Intel Core i5 or i7 processor
- Storage: 32 or 64 GB internal storage and 1 TB Google Drive storage for 3 years
- RAM: 8 or 16 GB
- Battery: 72 Wh

=== Pixelbook ===
On October 4, 2017, Google launched the first generation of the Pixelbook at its Made by Google 2017 event.

- Display: 12.3" display with 2400×1600 pixel resolution (235 PPI)
- Processor: 7th generation (Kaby Lake) Intel Core i5 or i7 processor
- Storage: 128, 256, or 512 GB internal storage
- RAM: 8 or 16 GB

=== Pixelbook Go ===
On October 15, 2019, Google announced a mid-range version of the Pixelbook, named the Pixelbook Go, at its Made by Google 2019 event.

- Display: 13.3" display with 1920×1080 pixel resolution (166 ppi) or "Molecular Display" 3840×2160 pixel resolution (331 PPI)
- Processor: 8th generation (Amber Lake) Intel Core m3, i5 or i7 processor
- Storage: 64, 128, or 256 GB internal storage
- RAM: 8 or 16 GB
- Battery: 47 Wh, 56 Wh (Molecular Display)

== Smartwatches ==
=== Pixel Watch ===
The Google Pixel Watch is a first-generation wearable from Google, released in October 2022. It features a circular display. Multiple watch wristbands are available on the Google Store.

=== Pixel Watch 2 ===
The Pixel Watch 2 is a second-generation wearable from Google, released in October 2023. It features a similar design to the first-generation Pixel Watch's circular display. Multiple watch wristbands are available on the Google Store.

=== Pixel Watch 3 ===
The Pixel Watch 3 is a third-generation wearable from Google, released in August 2024.

=== Pixel Watch 4 ===
The Pixel Watch 4 is a fourth-generation wearable made by Google, announced in August 2025.

=== Pixel Watch 5 ===
The Pixel Watch 5 is a fifth-generation wearable made by Google, announced in August 2026.

== Accessories ==
=== Pixel Buds ===
At Google's October 2017 hardware event, a set of wireless earbuds were unveiled alongside the Pixel 2 smartphones. The earbuds are designed for phones running Android Marshmallow or higher, and work with Google Assistant. In addition to audio playback and answering calls, the earbuds support translation in 40 languages through Google Translate. The earbuds can auto-pair with the Pixel 2 with the help of the Google Assistant and "Nearby". The Pixel Buds are available in the colors Just Black, Clearly White and Kinda Blue. The earbuds have a battery capacity of 120 mAh, while the charging case that comes with the Pixel Buds have a battery capacity of 620 mAh. The earbuds are priced at $159.

A second generation of Pixel Buds was released in 2020, omitting the cord between the two earbuds. In June 2021, a mid-range variant of the second-generation earbuds was released as the Pixel Buds A-Series.

At the 2022 Google I/O event, an enhanced version of the second-generation earbuds was announced and later released in May 2022 as the Pixel Buds Pro, which featured Active Noise Cancellation mode, transparency mode, and spatial audio (added in a subsequent software update). The "Pro" earbuds are priced at $199.

At Google's 2025 Made by Google event, the Pixel Buds 2a were announced.

=== Pixelbook Pen ===
Alongside the launch of the Pixelbook in October 2017, Google announced the Pixelbook Pen, a stylus for use with the Pixelbook. It has pressure sensitivity and support for Google Assistant. The Pen is powered by a replaceable AAAA battery and is priced at US$99.

=== Pixel Stand ===
In October 2018, Google announced the Pixel Stand alongside the Pixel 3 smartphones. In addition to standard 5 watt Qi wireless charging, the Pixel Stand has wireless 10 watt charging using a proprietary technology from Google. It also enables a software mode on the Pixel 3 that allows it to act as a smart display similar to the Google Home Hub. In October 2021, alongside the release of the Pixel 6 and Pixel 6 Pro smartphones, a second-generation Pixel Stand was made to support the phones' new wireless charging speeds of 23 watts.

=== Pixel Tag ===
In August 2026, Google announced a product called the Pixel Tag, to launch on November 11, 2026 for $29, which featured support for Bluetooth, and IP67.

== Software ==
=== Pixel UI (Pixel Launcher) ===
Pixel Launcher
- Developer: Google
- OS family: Unix-like (modified Linux kernel)
- Working state: Current
- Latest release: Android 16 / January 3, 2025; 22 months ago
- Marketing target: Smartphones and tablet computers

Articles in the series

Google Pixel UI is an Android skin used for the Pixel phones and the Pixel Tablet, developed by Google. Beginning with the first generation of Google Pixel phones, Google replaced the launcher for their smartphones with Pixel Launcher instead of Google Now Launcher which is the default launcher for Nexus series.

Unlike the Nexus phones, which Google shipped with "stock" Android (AOSP), the Pixel UI on the first-generation Pixel phones was slightly modified compared to "stock" Android. Currently, Pixel UI and its home launcher are available only on Pixel family devices. (However, third-party modifications allow non-Pixel smartphones to install the Pixel Launcher with Google Now feed integration).

During the launch of Android 4.x "Ice Cream Sandwich", Google had started to replace some stock Android apps with Google apps, including the stock Android music apps with Google Play Music, and Android browser with Google Chrome. By the launch of Android 4.4.x "KitKat", most of the stock Android apps had been replaced with Google apps, such as the stock Android gallery being replaced with Google Photos, etc. This also includes the Android home launcher being replaced with the Google Now Launcher, allowing users to access to their Google Now feed more conveniently. However, the rest of the UI was still similar to stock Android, including the settings menu and toggles buttons colors.

Google officially launched the Pixel Launcher and Pixel UI together in the Pixel phones; unlike the Google Now Launcher which allowed non Nexus phones to install, the Pixel Launcher was only available on the Pixel phones. Most Android smartphones including Nexus phones are incompatible with the launcher. Some modifications Google had done to differentiate Pixel UI with stock Android included the setting toggle's buttons colors, and 24/7 online support, which allowed the user to get direct support from Google's customer support.

=== Pixel Camera ===
The Pixel Camera is a camera software shipped with Pixel devices. The app features a basic camera interface, along with Night Vision, Super Res Zoom, and Motion Photos. Initially released on April 16, 2014, as Google Camera, the application was available on the Google Pixel phone until October 2023, when the software was renamed and delisted from Google Play. Multiple unofficial ports have been created to install features of the Pixel Camera on non-Google branded devices or older models of the phone.

== See also ==
- List of Google Play edition devices
- List of Google products
