= List of Wear OS devices =

The following is a comparative list of wearable devices using the Wear OS operating system.

Brand	Name	Date Released	Latest OS	Latest System Version	Processor	RAM	NFC	Battery	Display	Launch price	Water/Dust proofing		
Asus	ZenWatch	2014-11-09	Android Wear 1.5		Qualcomm Snapdragon 400	512 MB	No		Square, 1.63 in (41 mm)				
Asus	ZenWatch 2	2015-09	Android Wear 2.35	Android 7.1.1	Qualcomm Snapdragon 400	512 MB	No	380 mAh	Square, 1.63 in (41 mm)				
Asus	ZenWatch 2	2015-09	Android Wear 2.35	Android 7.1.1	Qualcomm Snapdragon 400	512 MB	No	290 mAh	Square, 1.45 in (37 mm)				
Asus	ZenWatch 3	2016-11	Android Wear 2.0	Android 7.1.1	Qualcomm Snapdragon Wear 2100	512 MB	No	340 mAh	Round, 1.39 in (35 mm)	$229			
Casio	Smart Outdoor Watch WSD-F10	2016-03-25	Wear OS 1.0	Android 8.0.0	Samsung S5P3472X02	512 MB	No			$500		No GPS	
Casio	Smart Outdoor Watch WSD-F20	2017-04-21	Wear OS 2.27	Android 8.0.0	Qualcomm Snapdragon Wear 2100	512 MB	No			$500	ATM 5 + US Military Standard: MIL-STD-810G	No Heart Rate Sensor, Has Microphone	
Casio	Smart Outdoor Watch WSD-F30	2019-01-18	Wear OS 2.6		Qualcomm Snapdragon Wear 2100	768 MB				$550	ATM 5 + US Military Standard: MIL-STD-810G	No Heart Rate Sensor, Has Microphone	
Fossil	Q Founder (Gen 1)	2015-10-05	Android Wear 2.16		Intel Atom	512 MB		400 mAh		$300			
Fossil	Q Marshal (Gen 2)	2016-03-15	Wear OS 2.0	H MR1 (Android 9.0.0)	Qualcomm Snapdragon Wear 2100	512 MB		360 mAh		$255			
Fossil	Q Wander (Gen 2)	2016-03-15	Wear OS 2.1	H MR1 (Android 9.0.0)	Qualcomm Snapdragon Wear 2100	512 MB		350 mAh		$295			
Fossil	Q Explorist (Gen 3)	2017-08-28	Android Wear 2.17	H MR1 (Android 9.0.0)	Qualcomm Snapdragon Wear 2100	512 MB				$255-$275			
Fossil	Q Venture (Gen 3)	2017-08-28	Wear OS 2.9	H MR1 (Android 9.0.0)	Qualcomm Snapdragon Wear 2100	512 MB				$255-$275			
Fossil	Q Control (Gen 3)	2017-11-12	Wear OS 2.10	H MR1 (Android 9.0.0)	Qualcomm Snapdragon Wear 2100	512 MB				$275			
Fossil	Q Explorist HR (Gen 4)	2018-08-06	Wear OS 2.34	H MR1 (Android 9.0.0)	Qualcomm Snapdragon Wear 2100	512 MB	Yes	330 mAh		$275		5 different models: FTW4012P, FTW4015P, FTW4016P, FTW4017P, FTW4018P	
Fossil	Q Venture HR (Gen 4)	2018-08-06	Wear OS 2.6	H MR1 (Android 9.0.0)	Qualcomm Snapdragon Wear 2100	512 MB	Yes	330 mAh		$275			
Fossil	Q Sport (Gen 4)	2018-11-12	Wear OS 2.45	H MR1 (Android 9.0.0)	Qualcomm Snapdragon Wear 3100	512 MB	Yes	350 mAh		$275	5 ATM		
Fossil	Q The Carlyle HR (Gen 5)	2019-08-05	Wear OS 2.37	H MR2 (Android 9.0.0)	Qualcomm Snapdragon Wear 3100	1 GB	Yes	310 mAh		$295	3 ATM, advertised as 'Swim-proof'	3 different models: FTW4024P, FTW4025P, FTW4026P	
Fossil	Q Julianna HR (Gen 5)	2019-08-05	Wear OS 2.17	H MR1 (Android 9.0.0)	Qualcomm Snapdragon Wear 3100	1 GB	Yes	310 mAh		$295	3 ATM, advertised as 'Swim-proof'	3 different models: FTW6035P, FTW6036P, FTW6054P	
Fossil	Garrett HR (Gen 5)	2019-08-26	Wear OS 2.17	H MR1 (Android 9.0.0)	Qualcomm Snapdragon Wear 3100	1 GB	Yes			$295	3 ATM, advertised as 'Swim-proof'	FTW4041 (Wi-Fi, BT 4.2 LE, NFC, Corning Gorilla Glass 4)	
Fossil	HR (Gen 6)	2021-09-22	Wear OS 3.5	H MR1 (Android 11.0.0)	Qualcomm Snapdragon Wear 4100+	1 GB	Yes			$299 Steel Band $319	3 ATM, advertised as 'Swim-proof'	FTW4061V (Wi-Fi, BT 5.1 LE, NFC, Corning Gorilla Glass 5) HR, SpO2	
Google	Pixel Watch	2022-10-06	Wear OS 5.1	(Android 15)	Samsung Exynos 9110	2 GB	Yes	294 mAh		$349.99 $399.99 (4G LTE)	5 ATM		
Google	Pixel Watch 2	2023-10-04	Wear OS 7	(Android 17)	Qualcomm Snapdragon W5 Gen 1	2 GB	Yes	306 mAh	Round, 1.63 in (41 mm)	$349.99 $399.99 (4G LTE)	5 ATM		
Google	Pixel Watch 3	2024-10-10	Wear OS 7	(Android 17)	Qualcomm Snapdragon W5 Gen 1	2 GB	Yes	307 mAh	Round, 1.63 or 1.77 in (41 or 44 mm)	$349.99 (41mm) $399.99 (44mm)	5 ATM		
Google	Pixel Watch 4	2025-10-09	Wear OS 7	(Android 17)	Qualcomm Snapdragon® W5 Gen 2, Cortex‑M55-Coprozessor	2 GB	Yes	455 mAh (45mm), 325 mAh (41mm)			5 ATM		
Google	Pixel Watch 5	2026-08-20	Wear OS 7	(Android 17)	Qualcomm Snapdragon® W5 Gen 2, Cortex‑M55-Coprozessor	3 GB	Yes	465 mAh (45mm), 332 mAh (41mm)			5 ATM		
Huawei	Watch	2015-09-02	Android Wear 2.35	(Android 7.1.1)	Qualcomm Snapdragon 400	512 MB	No	300 mAh	Round, 1.4 in (36 mm)		IP67		
Huawei	Watch 2	2017-04-18	Wear OS 2.27	(Android 8.0.0)	Qualcomm Snapdragon Wear 2100	768 MB	Yes	420 mAh	Round, 1.2 in (30 mm)	$299–400	IP68	Wi-Fi 802.11 b/g/n, Bluetooth 4.1,	
Huawei	Watch 2 Classic	2017-04-18	Wear OS 2.9		Qualcomm Snapdragon Wear 2100	768 MB	Yes	420 mAh	Round, 1.2 in (30 mm)		IP68		
Kate Spade	Scallop Smartwatch 2	2019-01-20	Wear OS 2.6		Qualcomm Snapdragon Wear 2100		Yes	300 mAh		$295 $335 (stainless steel)		GPS, Heart rate monitor	
LG	G Watch (W100)	2014-06-25	Android Wear 1.5		Qualcomm Snapdragon 400	512 MB	No	400 mAh	Square, 1.65 in (42 mm)		IP67		
LG	G Watch R (W110)	2014-10-25	Android Wear 2.24		Qualcomm Snapdragon 400	512 MB	No	410 mAh	Round, 1.3 in (33 mm)		IP67	PPG (Heart rate monitor)	
LG	Watch Urbane (W150)	2015-04-27	Android Wear 2.23		Qualcomm Snapdragon 400	512 MB	No	410 mAh	Round, 1.3 in (33 mm)		IP67	PPG (Heart rate monitor)	
LG	Watch Urbane 2nd Edition (W200V)	2016-03	Android Wear 2.15		Qualcomm Snapdragon 400	768 MB	Yes	570 mAh	Round, 1.38 in (35 mm)				
LG	Watch Style (W270)	2017-02-09	Wear OS 2.27	Android 8.0.0	Qualcomm Snapdragon Wear 2100	512 MB	No	240 mAh	Round, 1.2 in (30 mm)	$249.99	IP67		
LG	Watch Sport (W280A)	2017-02-09	Wear OS 2.30	Android 8.0.0	Qualcomm Snapdragon Wear 2100	768 MB	Yes	430 mAh	Round, 1.38 in (35 mm)	$349.99	IP68		
LG	Watch W7 (W315)	2018-10	Android Wear 2.0		Qualcomm Snapdragon Wear 2100	768 MB	No	240 mAh	Round, 1.2 in (30 mm)			Physical watch hands No heart rate sensor	
Louis Vuitton	Tambour Horizon (2017)	2017	Wear OS 2.6		Qualcomm Snapdragon Wear 2100	512 MB	Yes			£2140			
Louis Vuitton	Tambour Horizon (2019)	2019			Qualcomm Snapdragon Wear 3100	1 GB		300 mAh			3 ATM		
Michael Kors	Access		Wear OS 2.6				No						
Michael Kors	Runway	2018-09	Wear OS 2.17	H MR1 (Android 9.0.0)	Qualcomm Snapdragon Wear 2100	512 MB	Yes	300 mAh		$300 (silicone) $350 (metal) $450 (ceramic)	3 ATM (swim-ready)	PPG (Heart rate monitor)	
Misfit	Vapor	2017-10-31	Wear OS 2.6	Android 8.0.0	Qualcomm Snapdragon Wear 2100	512 MB	No	400 mAh		$199.99	5 ATM (swim-ready, up to 50m)		
Misfit	Vapor 2	2018-10-23	Wear OS 2.6		Qualcomm Snapdragon Wear 2100	512 MB	Yes	300/330 mAh		$249.99	5 ATM (swim ready, up to 50m)		
Misfit	Vapor X	2019-8-14	Wear OS 2.8		Qualcomm Snapdragon Wear 3100	512 MB	Yes	300 mAh		$279.99	5 ATM (swim ready, up to 50m)		
Mobvoi	TicWatch S & E	2018-01	Wear OS 2.24	8.0.0	MTK MT2601	512 MB	No	300 mAh	1.4 inch OLED display, 400x400, 287dpi	$159.99 (E) $199 (S)	IP67		
Mobvoi	TicWatch C2	2018-05	Wear OS 2.24	H MR1 (Android 9.0.0)	Qualcomm Snapdragon Wear 2100	512 MB	No	400 mAh		$249.99	IP68	Microphone and speaker	
Mobvoi	TicWatch Pro	2018-07-10	Wear OS 2.24	H MR1 (Android 9.0.0)	Qualcomm Snapdragon Wear 2100	512 MB	Yes	415 mAh		$249.99	IP68 + Waterproof: 5 ATM (swim-ready, up to 50m) + US Military Standard: MIL-STD-810G	Microphone and speaker	
Mobvoi	TicWatch Pro 4G	2019-07	Wear OS 2.24	H MR1 (Android 9.0.0)	Qualcomm Snapdragon Wear 2100	1 GB	Yes	415 mAh	1.39" AMOLED (400 x 400 px) + FSTN LCD	$299.99	IP68 + Waterproof: 5 ATM (swim-ready, up to 50m) + US Military Standard: MIL-STD-810G	Microphone and speaker. ESIM	
Mobvoi	TicWatch Pro 2020	2020-02	Wear OS 2.24	H MR1 (Android 9.0.0)	Qualcomm Snapdragon Wear 2100	1 GB	Yes	415 mAh		$249.99	IP68 + Waterproof: 5 ATM (swim-ready, up to 50m) + US Military Standard: MIL-STD-810G	Microphone and speaker	
Mobvoi	TicWatch C2	2018-12-06	Wear OS 2.24	H MR1 (Android 9.0.0)	Qualcomm Snapdragon Wear 2100	512 MB	Yes	400 mAh		€179.99	IP68		
Mobvoi	TicWatch S2 & E2	2019-01-22	Wear OS 2.24	H MR1 (Android 9.0.0)	Qualcomm Snapdragon Wear 2100	512 MB	No	415 mAh	1.39" OLED 400×400 px	$159.99 (E2) $179.99 (S2)	Waterproof: 5 ATM (swim-ready, up to 50m) S2 Only - US Military Standard: MIL-STD-810G	Microphone but no speaker	
Mobvoi	TicWatch Pro 3 GPS	2020-09-24	Wear OS 3.5	(Android 11)	Qualcomm Snapdragon Wear 4100	1 GB	Yes	577 mAh	1.4” Retina AMOLED 454 x 454 + FSTN display	$299	Waterproof: IP68 and pool swimming suitable	Microphone and speaker	
Mobvoi	TicWatch E3	2021-06-16	Wear OS 3.5	(Android 11)	Qualcomm Snapdragon Wear 4100	1 GB	Yes	380 mAh	1.3" High Density Display (360 x 360 px)	$199.99	Waterproof: IP68 and pool swimming suitable	Microphone and speaker	
Mobvoi	TicWatch Pro 5	2023-05-24	Wear OS 3.5		Qualcomm Snapdragon W5+ Gen 1	2 GB	Yes	628 mAh	1.43-inch 466×466 326 ppi, Always On Display OLED + Ultra-low-power Display	$350.00	Waterproof: IP68 and pool swimming suitable	Microphone and speaker	
Montblanc	Summit	2017-05	Wear OS 2.6		Qualcomm Snapdragon Wear 2100	512 MB	No	300 mAh					
Montblanc	Summit 2	2018-10-15	Wear OS 2.27	H MR2 (Android 9.0.0)	Qualcomm Snapdragon Wear 3100	1 GB	Yes	500 mAh		$995	5 ATM		
Montblanc	Summit 3	2022-07-15	Wear OS 3.0		Qualcomm Snapdragon 4100+	1 GB				$1,290	5 ATM		
Motorola	Moto 360 (1st generation)	2014-09-05	Android Wear 1.4	Android 6.0.1	TI OMAP 3630	512 MB	No	300 mAh - 1.1 Wh	Round Flat Bottom "Flat Tire", 1.56 in (40 mm)	$299	IP67	Microphone but no speaker	
Motorola	Moto 360 (2nd generation)	2015-09-15	Android Wear 2.17	Android 7.1.1	Qualcomm Snapdragon 400	512 MB	No	400 mAh (46 mm)	Round Flat Bottom "Flat Tire", 1.56 in (40 mm)	$299	IP67	Microphone but no speaker	
Motorola	Moto 360 (2nd generation)	2015-09-15	Android Wear 2.17	Android 7.1.1	Qualcomm Snapdragon 400	512 MB	No	300 mAh (42 mm)	Round Flat Bottom, "Flat Tire", 1.37 in (35 mm)		IP67	Microphone but no speaker	
Motorola	Moto 360 Sport	2016-01	Android Wear 2.9	Android 7.1.1W6	Qualcomm Snapdragon 400	512 MB		300 mAh	Round Flat Bottom, "Flat Tire", 1.37 in (35 mm)			Microphone but no speaker	
Motorola	Moto 360 (3rd generation)	2020-09-10	Wear OS 2.44	H MR2 (Android 9.0.0)	Qualcomm Snapdragon Wear 3100	1 GB	Yes	355 mAh	Round, 1.2 in (30 mm)	$349.99	3ATM		
Motorola	Moto Watch Ultra	2026-09-10	Wear OS 6.0	Android 16	Qualcomm Snapdragon W5+ Gen 1	2GB	Yes		550 mAh	Round, 1.5 in (38 mm) 439ppi	$349.99	IP68/5ATM	Microphone and speaker sensors include Accelerometer, gyro, heart rate, compass, barometer, SpO2
New Balance	RunIQ Watch		Android Wear 2.15	Wear OS App Version: 2.35 (Android 9 H MR1)	Intel Atom Z34XX	512 MB							
Nixon	Mission	2016-10-10	Wear OS 2.6	Android 7.1.1W3	Qualcomm Snapdragon 2100	512 MB		400 mAh					
OnePlus	Watch 2	2024-03-05	Wear OS 5.0	Android 14	Snapdragon W5 & BES Wear 2700	2 GB	Yes	500 mAh	Round 2.5D glass, 1.43 in (36.3 mm)	$300	IP68		
OnePlus	Watch 2R												
OnePlus	Watch 3 (46mm)	2025-02-25	Wear OS 5.0, RTOS, ColorOS Watch 7	Android 14	Snapdragon W5 Gen 1 & BES Wear 2800	2 GB	Yes	648 mAh	Round, 1.5 in (38.1 mm) 310 ppi	$320	IP68, 5ATM, MIL-STD-810H		
OnePlus	Watch 3 43mm	2025-07-08	Wear OS 5.0, RTOS, ColorOS Watch 7	Android 14	Snapdragon W5 Gen 1 & BES Wear 2800	2GB	Yes	354 mAh	Round 2.5D glass , 1.32 in (33.5 mm) 352 ppi			IP68, 5ATM	0.75mm thinner than Oneplus Watch 3
OnePlus	Watch 4	2026-04-22	OxygenOS Watch 8, Wear OS 7.0	Android 17	Qualcomm Snapdragon W5 Gen 1	2GB	Yes	646 mAh					5ATM
Oppo	OPPO Watch 46 mm (LTE)	2020-03-20	Wear OS 2.23		Qualcomm Snapdragon Wear 3100	1 GB	Yes	430 mAh			5 ATM		
Oppo	OPPO Watch 46 mm (Wi-Fi)	2020-03-20	Wear OS 2.45	H MR2 (Android 9.0)	Qualcomm Snapdragon Wear 3100	1 GB	Yes	430 mAh	Square, 1.91 in (48.5 mm) 402x476px 326ppi	$290	5 ATM		
Oppo	OPPO Watch 41 mm (Wi-Fi)	2020-03-20	Wear OS 2.23		Qualcomm Snapdragon Wear 3100	1 GB	Yes	300 mAh			3 ATM		
Oppo	Oppo Watch 2	2021-07-27			Qualcomm Snapdragon Wear 4100	1 GB	Yes	510 mAh			5 ATM		
Oppo	Oppo Watch 3	2022-08-29			Qualcomm Snapdragon W5+ Gen 1	1 GB	Yes	400 mAh			5 ATM		
Oppo	Oppo Watch 3 Pro	2022-08-29			Qualcomm Snapdragon W5+ Gen	1 GB	Yes	550 mAh			5 ATM		
Oppo	Oppo Watch X												
Oppo	Oppo Watch X2 (rebadged Oneplus Watch 3)												
Oppo	Oppo Watch X2 Mini												
Oppo	OPPO Watch X3	2026-03-20	ColorOS Watch 8.0 (Chinese version), Wear OS 6.0	Android 16	Qualcomm Snapdragon W5 Gen 1 with BES2800BP co-processor	2GB	Yes	646mAh (typical) 632mAh (rated)	Round, 1.5 in (38.1 mm) 310ppi	AU$699	5ATM and "IP68/IP69 Water Resistance"		
Polar	M600		Wear OS 2.3		MTK MT2601	512 MB		500 mAh					
Samsung	Gear Live	2014-06-25	Android Wear 1.5	Android 6.0.1	Qualcomm Snapdragon 400	512 MB		300 mAh					
Samsung	Galaxy Watch 4	2021-08-27	Wear OS 6.0	Android 16	Samsung Exynos W920	1.5 GB	Yes	361 mAh (44 mm); 247 mAh (40 mm)			IP68 + Waterproof: 5 ATM (swim-ready, up to 50m) + US Military Standard: MIL-STD-810G		
Samsung	Galaxy Watch 4 Classic	2021-08-27	Wear OS 6.0	Android 16	Samsung Exynos W920	1.5 GB	Yes	361 mAh (46 mm); 247 mAh (42 mm)			IP68 + Waterproof: 5 ATM (swim-ready, up to 50m) + US Military Standard: MIL-STD-810G		
Samsung	Galaxy Watch 5	2022-08-26	Wear OS 7.0	Android 17	Samsung Exynos W920	1.5 GB	Yes	410 mAh (44 mm); 284 mAh (40 mm)			IP68 + Waterproof: 5 ATM (swim-ready, up to 50m) + US Military Standard: MIL-STD-810H		
Samsung	Galaxy Watch 5 Pro	2022-08-26	Wear OS 7.0	Android 17	Samsung Exynos W920	1.5 GB	Yes	590 mAh			IP68 + Waterproof: 5 ATM (swim-ready, up to 50m) + US Military Standard: MIL-STD-810H		
Samsung	Galaxy Watch 6 44 mm	2023-08-11	Wear OS 7.0	Android 17	Samsung Exynos W930	2 GB	Yes	425 mAh	Round, 1.46 in (37 mm)		IP68 + Waterproof: 5 ATM (swim-ready, up to 50m) + US Military Standard: MIL-STD-810H		
Samsung	Galaxy Watch 6 40 mm	2023-08-11	Wear OS 7.0	Android 17	Samsung Exynos W930	2 GB	Yes	300 mAh	Round, 1.31 in (33 mm)		IP68 + Waterproof: 5 ATM (swim-ready, up to 50m) + US Military Standard: MIL-STD-810H		
Samsung	Galaxy Watch 6 Classic 47 mm	2023-08-11	Wear OS 7.0	Android 17	Samsung Exynos W930	2 GB	Yes	425 mAh	Round, 1.46 in (37 mm)		IP68 + Waterproof: 5 ATM (swim-ready, up to 50m) + US Military Standard: MIL-STD-810H		
Samsung	Galaxy Watch 6 Classic 43 mm	2023-08-11	Wear OS 7.0	Android 17	Samsung Exynos W930	2 GB	Yes	300 mAh	Round, 1.31 in (33 mm)		IP68 + Waterproof: 5 ATM (swim-ready, up to 50m) + US Military Standard: MIL-STD-810H		
Samsung	Galaxy Watch 7 44 mm	2024-07-24	Wear OS 7.0	Android 17	Samsung Exynos W1000	2 GB	Yes	425 mAh	Round, 1.46 in (37 mm)		IP68 + 5 ATM		
Samsung	Galaxy Watch 7 40 mm	2024-07-24	Wear OS 7.0	Android 17	Samsung Exynos W1000	2 GB	Yes	300 mAh	Round, 1.31 in (33 mm)		IP68 + 5 ATM		
Samsung	Galaxy Watch Ultra (2024)	2024-07-24	Wear OS 7.0	Android 17	Samsung Exynos W1000	2 GB	Yes	590 mAh	Round, 1.46 in (37 mm)		IP68 + 10 ATM certified + US Military Standard:MIL-STD 810H		
Samsung	Galaxy Watch 8 44 mm	2025-07-09	Wear OS 7.0	Android 17	Samsung Exynos W1000	2 GB	Yes	435 mAh	Round, 1.47" (37.3 mm)		IP68 + 5 ATM + US Military Standard:MIL-STD 810H		
Samsung	Galaxy Watch 8 40 mm	2025-07-09	Wear OS 7.0	Android 17	Samsung Exynos W1000	2 GB	Yes	325 mAh	Round, 1.34" (34.0 mm)		IP68 + 5 ATM + US Military Standard:MIL-STD 810H		
Samsung	Galaxy Watch 8 Classic	2025-07-09	Wear OS 7.0	Android 17	Samsung Exynos W1000	2 GB	Yes	445 mAh	Round, 1.34" (34.0 mm)		IP68 + 5 ATM + US Military Standard:MIL-STD 810H		
Samsung	Galaxy Watch Ultra (2025)	2025-07-09	Wear OS 7.0	Android 17	Samsung Exynos W1000	2 GB	Yes	590 mAh	Round, 1.50" (38.1 mm)		IP68 + 5 ATM + US Military Standard:MIL-STD 810H		
Skagen	Falster 2	2018-08-12	Wear OS 2.11	H MR1 (Android 9.0.0)	Qualcomm Snapdragon Wear 2100	512 MB	Yes	300 mAh			IP67 + 3 ATM (swim-ready)		
Skagen	Falster 3	2020-01-07	Wear OS 2.11	H MR1 (Android 9.0.0)	Qualcomm Snapdragon Wear 3100	1 GB	Yes	310 mAh		$295	3 ATM (up to 50 m, swim-ready)		
Skagen	Falster 6	2021-08	Wear OS 3.0	H MR1 (Android 11.0.0)	Qualcomm Snapdragon Wear 4100+	1 GB	Yes	?	1.28" Active Area Diameter / 416×416 / 326 ppi	$295	3 ATM (up to 50 m, swim-ready)		
Sony	SmartWatch 3	2014-11	Android Wear 1.5	Android 6.0.1	Qualcomm Snapdragon 400	512 MB	Yes	420 mAh		179$	IP68		
Suunto	7	2020-01-31	Wear OS 2.23	H MR2 (Android 9.0.0)	Qualcomm Snapdragon Wear 3100	1 GB	Yes	450 mAh		499$	5 ATM		
Tag Heuer	Connected		Android Wear 2.0		Intel Atom Z34XX	1 GB		410 mAh					
Tag Heuer	Connected Modular 45		Wear OS 2.6		Intel Atom Z34XX	512 MB		410 mAh					
Tag Heuer	Connected E4		Wear OS 3.2		Qualcomm Snapdragon Wear 4100+		Yes	440 mAh					
Verizon	Wear24	2017-02-08	Android Wear 2.21	Android 7.1.1	Qualcomm Snapdragon Wear 2100	768 MB	Partial, see notes	450 mAh		$350 (original) $75 (discontinued)		NFC chip present but inactive due to lack of drivers in kernel.	
Xiaomi	Mi Watch	2019-11-05	Wear OS 2.27	H MR2	Qualcomm Snapdragon Wear 3100	1 GB	Yes	590 mAh		$150		eSIM, Wi-Fi 802.11 b/g/n, Bluetooth 4.2/A2DP/LE, GPS A-GPS/GLONASS/BDS, Wireless Charging	
Xiaomi	Watch 2 Pro	2023-10-13	Wear OS 4.0	H MR2	Qualcomm Snapdragon W5+ Gen 1	2 GB	Yes	495 mAh		$270		eSIM, Wi-Fi 802.11 b/g/n/ac, Bluetooth 5.2/A2DP/LE, GPS A-GPS/GLONASS/BDS, NFC, Wireless Charging	
ZTE	Quartz	2017-04-14	Android Wear 2.20		Qualcomm Snapdragon Wear 2100	768 MB	No	500 mAh					
