= LG Watch Sport =

2017 Android smartwatch

- Also known as: W280, W281 (International version)
- Developer: LG Electronics
- Manufacturer: LG Electronics
- Type: Smartwatch
- Released: Feb 09, 2017
- Operating system: Android Wear 2.0 (based on Android 7.1.1 Nougat)
- System on a chip: Qualcomm Snapdragon Wear 2100
- CPU: Quad ARM Cortex A7 @ 1.2GHz
- Memory: 768MB (LPDDR3)
- Storage: 4GB eMMC
- Display: 1.38-inch P-OLED Display (480 x 480 / 348ppi)
- Graphics: Adreno 304
- Sound: Mono Speaker
- Input: Capacitive Touch Rotating crown Button; 6-axis sensor(Gyro/ Accelerometer); Barometer; Microphone; NFC; Heart rate monitor GPS Ambient Light Sensor
- Connectivity: LTE (telecommunication) 3G; Wi-Fi 802.11 b/g/n Bluetooth 4.2 LE
- Power: 430mAh Wireless Charging
- Online services: Google Play, Google Assistant
- Dimensions: 45.4 x 51.21 x 15.5mm
- Weight: 86g
- Predecessor: LG Watch Urbane

The LG Watch Sport is a smartwatch released by LG Corporation on Feb 09, 2017. The device is one of the first smartwatches to ship with Android Wear version 2.0 with LTE (telecommunication) and Android Pay support.
