= LG G Watch =

Smartwatch

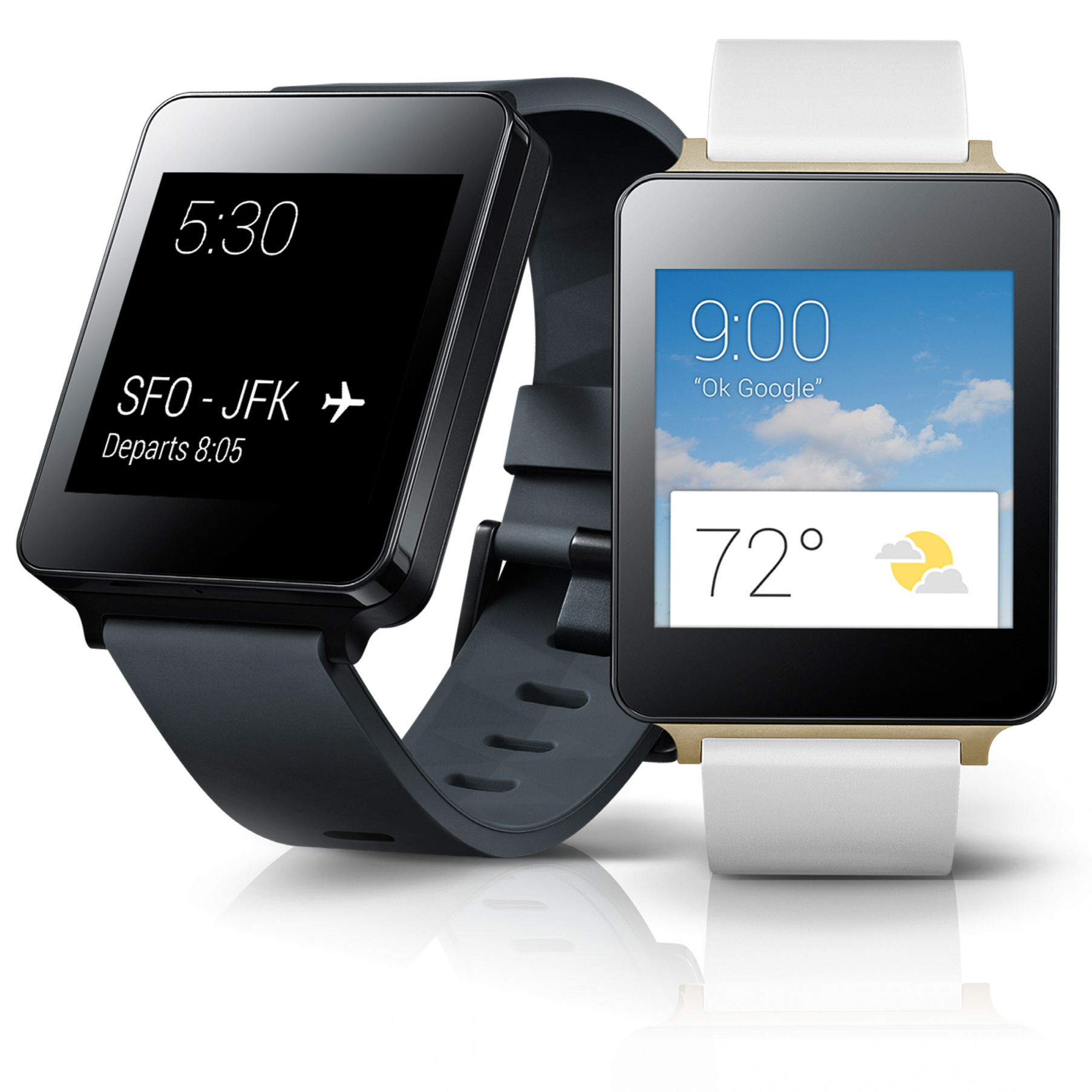
- Also known as: W100
- Developer: LG Electronics
- Type: Smartwatch
- Released: June 25, 2014
- Operating system: Android Wear 1.5.0.4047106 (based on Android 6.0.1 "Marshmallow"), upgradable to WearOS 2.14.0 (based on Android 7.1.1) via sideloading.
- System on a chip: Qualcomm Snapdragon 400 MSM8026
- CPU: Quad-core 1.2 GHz
- Memory: 512 MB
- Storage: 4 GB
- Display: 1.65 in (42 mm) LCD with RGB matrix 280 × 280 pixels
- Connectivity: Bluetooth LE
- Power: 400 mAh
- Online services: Google Play, Google Now
- Dimensions: 46.5 x 37.9 x 9.95 mm (LxWxH)
- Weight: 63 g (2.2 oz)
- Successor: LG G Watch R
- Website: LG G Watch

The LG G Watch (model W100, codenamed Dory) is an Android Wear-based smartwatch announced and released by LG and Google on June 25, 2014. It was released along with the Samsung Gear Live as launch devices for Android Wear, a modified version of Android designed specifically for smartwatches and other wearables. It is compatible with all smartphones running Android 4.3 or higher that support Bluetooth LE.

G Watch was, as of June 2014, only available in the United States and Canada at US$229 or in the United Kingdom for £159 on the Google Play Store. As of July 2014, the G Watch was also made available in Australia, France, Germany, India, Ireland, Italy, Japan, South Korea, and Spain.

The G Watch R is a variant featuring a round face and an OLED screen.

== Hardware ==
The G Watch has IP67 certification for dust and water resistance. It has a user-replaceable buckle-based strap. The watch has no buttons. It uses an always-on rectangular shaped display.

== Software ==
The G Watch runs Android Wear, which features a notification system based on Google Now technology that enables it to receive spoken commands from the user. Users may also install the open-source AsteroidOS or PostmarketOS.

== Reception ==
JR Raphael of Computerworld liked the LG G Watch's superior dimmed-mode display, comfortable band, and easy-to-use charging cradle, but did not like the uninspired design and poor outdoor visibility display compared to Samsung Gear Live.

== See also ==
- Wearable computer
- Moto 360
