= W110 =

W110 may refer to:

== Art ==
- John the Baptist preaching (W110), a circa 1633/1634 painting by Rembrandt; see List of paintings by Rembrandt.

== Electronics ==
- The LG G Watch R, an Android-based smartwatch released in 2014.
- The Sony Cybershot DSC-W110 camera; see List of Sony Cyber-shot cameras#W series.

== Games ==
- Idro, a fantasy wargame published by International Team in 1980, with code W110.

== Mathematics ==
- Rule 110, a Turing-complete one-dimensional cellular automaton.
- The small snub icosicosidodecahedron, Wenninger number W_{110}.

== Transportation ==
- The Mercedes-Benz W110, a line of midsize automobiles in the 1960s.
- The Nissan Bluebird W110/112/113 station wagon, a 1950s automobile; see Nissan Bluebird#110 series.
