= Soleus Running =

Watch company based in Austin, Texas, United States

Soleus Running is a watch company that produces timing devices such as watches and cycling computers that use GPS and heart rate monitors. Its headquarters are located in Austin, Texas.

== Etymology ==
Soleus Running gets its name from the muscle located in the back part of the lower leg called the soleus. It begins right below the knee and runs down to the heel, and is involved in standing, walking and running. If not for the soleus, the body would fall forward.

== Features ==
Soleus Running sells a variety of devices ranging in style, features and price. Some of the watches have the ability to track an activity using GPS or a heart rate monitor.

== Watches ==
As of July 2014, the watches for sale on its website are:

Running:

- Dash
- Chicked
- P.R.
- Ultra Sole
- Stride
- Swift
- Tempo
- Flash

GPS:

- mini
- Fit
- Vibe
- Cross Country
- Sole
- Pulse
- Tour

Cycling:

- Draft

On the website, other items besides watches can be bought such as heart rate monitors, hats and headbands.

== External ==
- Homepage
- Shop
