= Samsung Gear Live =

Android Wear-based smartwatch

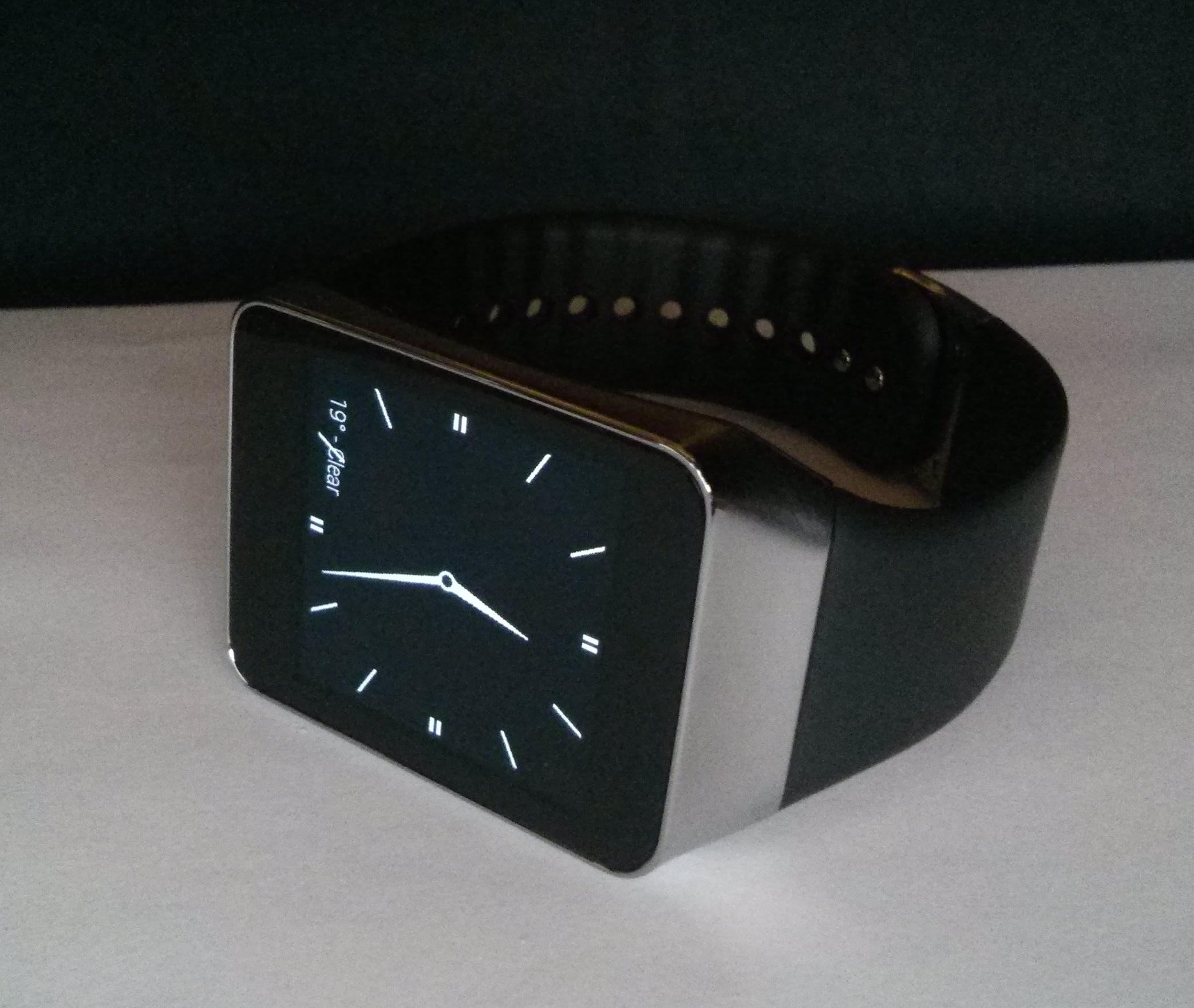
- Developer: Samsung Electronics
- Product family: Gear
- Type: Smartwatch
- Released: June 25, 2014
- Discontinued: May 14, 2015 (Google Store)
- Operating system: Android Wear 4.4.2
- System on a chip: Qualcomm Snapdragon 400 MSM8226
- CPU: Quad-core 1.2 GHz
- Memory: 512 MB
- Storage: 4 GB
- Display: 1.63 in (41 mm) Super AMOLED with RGB matrix 320×320 pixels (1:1 Aspect ratio) (278 ppi)
- Connectivity: Bluetooth Smart
- Power: 300 mAh
- Online services: Google Play, Google Now
- Weight: 59 g (2.1 oz)

The Samsung Gear Live is an Android Wear-based smartwatch announced and released by Samsung and Google on June 25, 2014. It was released along with the LG G Watch as launch devices for Android Wear, a modified version of Android designed specifically for smartwatches and other wearables. Gear Live is the 5th device launched in the Samsung Gear family of wearables. It is compatible with all smartphones running Android 4.3 or higher that support Bluetooth Smart.

Gear Live was initially available in the United States and Canada at US$199 on the Google Play Store, and from Google's Play Store in the UK for £169. As of July 2014, the Gear Live was also available in Australia, France, Germany, India, Ireland, Italy, Japan, South Korea, and Spain.

== Hardware ==
It is IP67 certified for dust and water resistance. It also has a steel exterior and a user-replaceable 22mm strap. The watch features a power button and heart rate monitor.

== Software ==
The notification system is based on Google Now technology, enabling it to accept, receive, transduce and ultimately process spoken commands given by the user.

== Reception ==
JR Raphael of Computerworld preferred the Gear Live's illuminated display compared to the LG G Watch, more distinctive design and the heart-rate sensor but did not like the poor outdoor visibility, the hard to use charger, awkward watch band and that it includes a redundant preinstalled stopwatch application.

== See also ==
- Moto 360
