= LG Watch Style =

Smartwatch model

- Also known as: W270
- Developer: LG Electronics
- Manufacturer: LG Electronics
- Type: Smartwatch
- Released: Feb 09, 2017
- Operating system: Wear OS 2.10 (based on Android 8.0.0 Oreo)
- System on a chip: Qualcomm Snapdragon Wear 2100
- CPU: Quad ARM Cortex A7 @ 1.2GHz
- Memory: 512MB (LPDDR3)
- Storage: 4GB eMMC
- Display: 1.2-inch P-OLED Display (360 x 360 / 299ppi)
- Graphics: Adreno 304
- Input: Capacitive Touch Rotating crown Button; 6-axis sensor(Gyro/ Accelerometer); Microphone Ambient Light Sensor
- Connectivity: Bluetooth 4.2 LE; Wi-Fi 802.11 b/g/n
- Power: 240mAh Wireless Charging
- Online services: Google Play, Google Assistant
- Dimensions: 42.3 x 45.7 x 10.79mm
- Weight: 46g
- Predecessor: LG Watch Urbane

The LG Watch Style is a smartwatch released by LG Corporation on 9 February 2017. The device is one of the first smartwatches to ship with Android Wear version 2.0.
