= LG G Watch R =

2014 Android Wear-based smartwatch

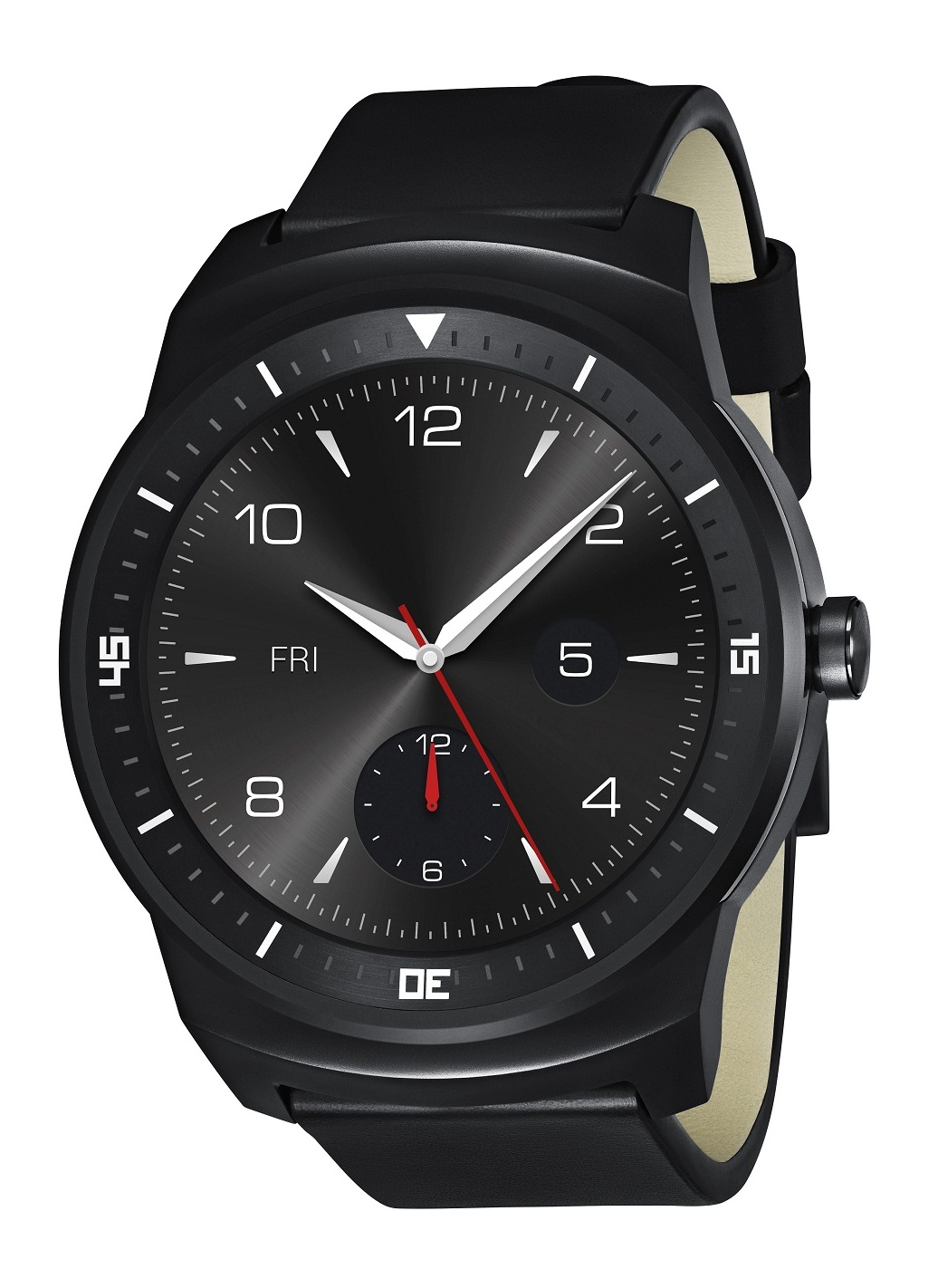
- Also known as: W110
- Developer: LG Electronics
- Manufacturer: LG Electronics
- Type: Smartwatch
- Released: October 24, 2014
- Discontinued: June 3, 2015
- Operating system: Android Wear 2.16.0.214308073 (based on Android 7.1.1 "Nougat")
- System on a chip: Qualcomm Snapdragon 400 MSM8226
- CPU: Quad-core ARM Cortex A7 @ 1.2 GHz (Software locked to single-core 700 MHz)
- Memory: 512 MB LPDDR2
- Storage: 4 GB eMMC
- Display: 1.3 in (33 mm) OLED with RGB matrix 320 x 320 pixels
- Input: Capacitive touch Pedometer (9-axis sensor); Barometer; PPG heart rate monitor Dual microphones
- Connectivity: Bluetooth LE; WiFi 802.11 b/g/n
- Power: 410 mAh
- Online services: Google Play, Google Now
- Weight: 62 g (2.2 oz)
- Predecessor: LG G Watch
- Successor: LG Watch Urbane
- Website: LG G Watch R

The LG G Watch R (model W110) is an Android Wear-based smartwatch announced and released by LG and Google on October 25, 2014. It is the second round-faced smartwatch after the Motorola Moto 360 but, unlike the 360, it is the first to feature a full circular display. It is the successor to LG's original LG G Watch, which features a rectangular display.

== Hardware ==
The G Watch R has IP67 certification for dust and water resistance. It has a user-replaceable buckle-based strap. The watch consists of a 1.2 GHz Quad-Core Qualcomm Snapdragon 400 processor, 4GB internal storage and 512MB RAM. It is encased in a brushed aluminum and stainless steel body, which holds on the P-OLED display. The smartwatch has Bluetooth LE connectivity, a barometer for several uses including atmospheric pressure and altitude, an accelerometer, a gyroscope and a heart rate monitor. Wi-Fi connectivity was enabled in an official patch. While the watch does include a microphone, the lack of a speaker makes it impossible to make calls on it.
