= Mei-Yuh Hwang =

Chinese speech recognition researcher

Mei-Yuh Hwang (Chinese: 黄美玉) is a Taiwanese speech recognition researcher who works for Mobvoi in Redmond, Washington, and holds a position as affiliate professor of electrical and computer engineering at the University of Washington.

== Education and career ==
Hwang was a student at National Taiwan University, where she earned a bachelor's degree in 1986. She went to Carnegie Mellon University for graduate study, completing her Ph.D. in 1993 with Kai-Fu Lee, Raj Reddy, and Xuedong Huang as faculty mentors. Her dissertation was Subphonetic Acoustical Modeling for Speaker-Independent Continuous Speech Recognition.

In 1994 she joined Microsoft with Xuedong Huang. Her projects at Microsoft included the Whisper dictation application, the Microsoft Speech API, multi-language dictation in Office XP, Microsoft Speech Server, Bing Translator, and the Chinese version of the Cortana virtual assistant. She also worked on leave from Microsoft as a researcher at the University of Washington from 2004 to 2008, working there on a system for monitoring Mandarin and Arabic language news media and producing English-language digests of their content.

In 2016 she was hired by Mobvoi to become their vice president of engineering.

== Recognition ==
Hwang was elected as an IEEE Fellow, in the 2019 class of fellows, "for contributions to speech and language technology".
