= Facer (app) =

Watch face platform

- Company type: Watch face platform
- Industry: Smartwatches
- Headquarters: Los Angeles, California
- Key people: Ariel Vardi (CEO & Co-founder)
- Website: https://www.facer.io/

Facer is a watch face platform for Apple Watch, Wear OS, and Tizen-based smartwatches, developed by Los Angeles-based Little Labs, Inc. It allows users to select from premade watch faces or create custom designs through its web-based editor.

== Overview ==
Facer was launched in 2015 as a platform for Android and Wear OS smartwatches. In March 2016, the platform expanded to support iOS and Apple Watch. The platform supports smartwatches including Wear OS, watchOS and Tizen. The platform allows users to browse and download designs themed around various genres and styles. Users can access the platform for free, though some premium watch faces require in-app purchases. Facer also allows users interested in designing to create their own watch faces through its web-based editor, Facer Creator.

Little Labs, Inc., the company behind Facer, is headquartered in Los Angeles, California.
