= Mobvoi =

Chinese electronics company

- Type: Private
- Industry: Artificial Intelligence; Computer software; Consumer electronics; Digital distribution
- Founded: October 1, 2012; 14 years ago, in Beijing, China.
- Founders: Zhifei Li; Yuanyuan Li (Co-Founder)
- Headquarters: Nanjing
- Area served: Worldwide
- Key people: Zhifei Li (Founder & CEO); Yuanyuan Li (Co-Founder); Mike Lei (CTO); Mei-Yuh Hwang (VP. of Engineering)
- Products: Chumenwenwen Mobile Voice Search; TicAuto; TicMirror and TicEye; TicWatch; TicPods
- Website: www.mobvoi.com

Mobvoi Information Technology Company Limited (simplified Chinese: 出门问问; traditional Chinese: 出門問問; pinyin: Chūmén Wènwèn) is a technological company headquartered in Beijing, China that sells and develops consumer electronics and Chinese voice recognition, natural language processing, and vertical search technology in-house.

The core team members include ex-Googlers, AI experts, former Nokia employees, engineers and researchers from top universities such as Johns Hopkins, Harvard, MIT, Cambridge, and Tsinghua or top-tier Internet companies such as Yahoo Beijing, Baidu, Tencent, etc. Since inception, Mobvoi has raised 5 rounds of funding led by Sequoia Capital, ZhenFund, SIG, Perfect Optronics Ltd (HK listed), GoerTek (A- Share listed) and Google with total fundraising amount of US$75 million.

== History ==
Mobvoi was founded in October 2012 by Zhifei Li. In May 2013, Mobvoi released their Voice Search Service featured in the popular messaging app, WeChat. In 2014, Mobvoi launched their independent voice search app called Chumenwenwen, which covers over 60 vertical domains, providing various types of everyday information.

In 2014, Mobvoi released their own smartwatch operating system, TicWear, based on Google's Wear OS. Among the modifications, TicWear removes Google's services, which are banned in China. Mobvoi partnered with Frog Design to release TicWatch.

In 2015 Google formed a strategic partnership with Mobvoi to work together on the efforts to bring Wear OS to China. The Moto 360 was the first Wear OS device in China to carry Chinese voice search and voice controls powered by Mobvoi. Mobvoi also launched the Google-backed Mobvoi Store China.

Then, in June 2015, Mobvoi launched the TicWatch in China, featuring their TicWear operating system. The TicWatch ranked first in sales for Android smartwatches in China, coming in second to Apple Watch on platforms such as JD.com, Tmall, Suning, and Amazon. TicWatch has 100K+ users and 100M+ sales.

In 2016, Mobvoi launched TicAuto, an AI enabled mirror for automobiles. CES 2016 showcased Ticauto and Ticmirror in the automotive field innovations section.

In June 2016, the TicWatch 2 was launched on the JD.com's crowdfunding platform, and sold over RMB 12 million within 11 days. On July 25, 2016, Mobvoi launched the TicWatch 2 Global Edition on Kickstarter. The Kickstarter achieved its goal of US$50,000 in less than ten minutes and generated over 2 million in support in less than 29 days.

In April 2017, Mobvoi launched a chatbot that can communicate with voice-activated smart home devices. In 2020, Mobvoi released an AI anchor for Guangming Daily.

== Products ==
=== Chumenwenwen Mobile Voice Search ===
Chumenwenwen is a voice-activated AI assistance app available on Android and iOS devices. It enables searches in over 60 vertical fields of interest. It provides users the ability to ask it for directions, restaurant suggestions, news, and weather information, among many other options. In 2014, Chumenwenwen became the official voice service provider for Wear OS users in China.

=== TicAuto ===
TicAuto is an in-vehicle voice app, integrating speech recognition, semantic analysis, vertical search, TTS and other advanced technology to provide voice navigation, POI search, instant messaging, and on-board entertainment.

=== TicMirror and TicEye ===
TicMirror is an in-car robot integrating Mobvoi's voice engine. TicMirror allows users to perform everything they could with TicAuto and more, with the addition of 7.84-inch touch screen that doubles as a rear view mirror. It has a 160-degree wide-angle lens, allowing it to be used as a 1080p dashcam. As an accessory to TicMirror, Mobvoi also offers TicEye, an Advanced Driver Assistance System (ADAS) that provides front collision warning and lane departure warnings.

=== TicWatch and TicWatch 2 Global Edition ===
TicWatch is Mobvoi's first attempt at creating a smartwatch powered by their TicWear operating system, a modified version of Google's Wear OS. TicWatch is compatible with Android and iOS devices. It can be used as a standalone fitness tracker and has built in GPS and heart rate sensor chipsets. TicWatch was initially introduced to the market in China. A Ticwatch 2 Global Edition was later launched for the global users on Kickstarter. The version released in China features an eSIM data connection. This feature is removed from the Global Edition due to complications with cellular partners. The Kickstarter raised over 2 million dollars in funding.

=== TicWatch S and E ===
The TicWatch S and E models are Mobvoi's second attempt at crowdfunding a smartwatch device on Kickstarter. The devices are powered by Wear OS 2.0 instead of Mobvoi's TicWear, making it the models the company's first device using Google's operating system. The Kickstarter raised over 3 million dollars with more than 19,000 backers.

=== TicWatch Pro ===
The TicWatch Pro was released in mid-2018 running Google's Wear OS. It features a layered display, combining an AMOLED and LCD to extend the battery life. The watch offers two power-saving modes. In "Smart Mode", the LCD is always enabled, only turning the AMOLED display on when awakened by the user. This mode provides with 2–5 days of battery life. In "Essential Mode", Wear OS is shut down, and only the LCD is active, only featuring time, date, heart rate, steps and battery display. In this mode, the device is expected to provide up to 30 days of battery life.

The watch comes with NFC (supporting Google Pay), GPS or AGPS, accelerometer, gyro, magnetic sensor, PPG heart rate sensor, ambient light sensor and low latency off-body sensor. It is rated as IP68 water and dust resistance.

In 2020 the TicWatch Pro was upgraded to the TicWatch Pro 2020, which retained most of the original model's specifications but doubled the RAM capacity to 1 GB, and added improved durability. In early 2021, a subsequent upgrade was released, the TicWatch Pro S, which again had a very similar specification to its predecessors, but featured improved sports and health tracking capabilities. An error in a press release given to the media led many to report that the storage capacity had been doubled to 8 GB, but Mobvoi confirmed that this was not the case and the internal storage capacity remained at 4 GB as on the two previous TicWatch Pro models.

=== TicWatch C2 ===
The TicWatch C2 was released in H2 2018.

=== TicWatch S2 and E2 ===
The TicWatch S2 and E2 were announced at CES 2019 and were released on 22 January 2019. The two watches are identical except for the design and the fact that the S2 is certified for MIL-STD-810G military-grade durability, while the E2 is not.

Both are powered by the Snapdragon Wear 2100 SOC, commonly used by other Wear OS smartwatches. The S2 & E2 both have plastic cases, heart rate sensors, 415 mAh batteries, and built in GPS. They run Wear OS and have a few Mobvoi apps pre-installed including TicHealth and TicExercise. The 35 mm (1.39 in) diameter, circular OLED screen measures 979 mm^{2} (1.517 sq in) with 400×400 pixels giving a resolution of 114.3 dot/cm (290 DPI). The lugs use standard quick release spring bars and can be swapped with other straps including those sold by Mobvoi. They are both certified waterproof to a pressure of 5 atm (510 kPa) which means they can withstand a depth of up to 50 m (160 ft) underwater and are suitable for swimming. They have a microphone but no speaker. They do not have NFC for contactless payments nor an ambient light sensors for automatic brightness. They use the same proprietary magnetic charger by Mobvoi. They include 512 MB of RAM and 4 GB of storage.

=== TicWatch Pro 3 GPS ===
The TicWatch Pro 3 GPS was launched in September 2020. It is the second watch in Mobvoi's Pro lineup, the TicWatch Pro (2020) being the first. It operates on Google's Wear OS, just like the previous smartwatches from Mobvoi.

The TicWatch Pro 3 GPS is the first Wear OS watch to use Qualcomm's Snapdragon Wear 4100 chipset. It uses a dual-display technology, where the main display is an AMOLED display while the second one is a low power FSTN screen. The 1.4" AMOLED display is protected by Gorilla Glass 3 and comes with an IP68 water resistant rating.

The watch's dimensions are 47 x 48 x 12.2 mm. It has 22 mm replaceable silicon straps. It contains minimal battery capacity of 577 mAh and nominal battery capacity of 595 mAh.

The TicWatch Pro 3 GPS comes with 1 GB RAM and 8 GB storage. The sensors include blood O2 saturation level, night infrared static heart rate sensor, accelerometer, barometer, gyroscope, ambient light sensor and GPS.

For this smart watch Mobovoi launched new applications like TicHearing, TicZen, TicOxygen and TicBreathe, while older applications like TicSleep, TicPulse and TicExercise were updated.

=== TicWatch Pro 3 Ultra GPS ===
The TicWatch Pro 3 Ultra GPS is an updated version of the TicWatch Pro 3 with an upgraded Snapdragon Wear 4100 SoC. It launched with Wear OS 2.5, but was later updated to Wear OS 3 and Wear OS 4. It features multiple quality-of-life updates to the Ticwatch Pro 3.

Mobvoi Ticwatch Pro 5/Pro 5 Enduro
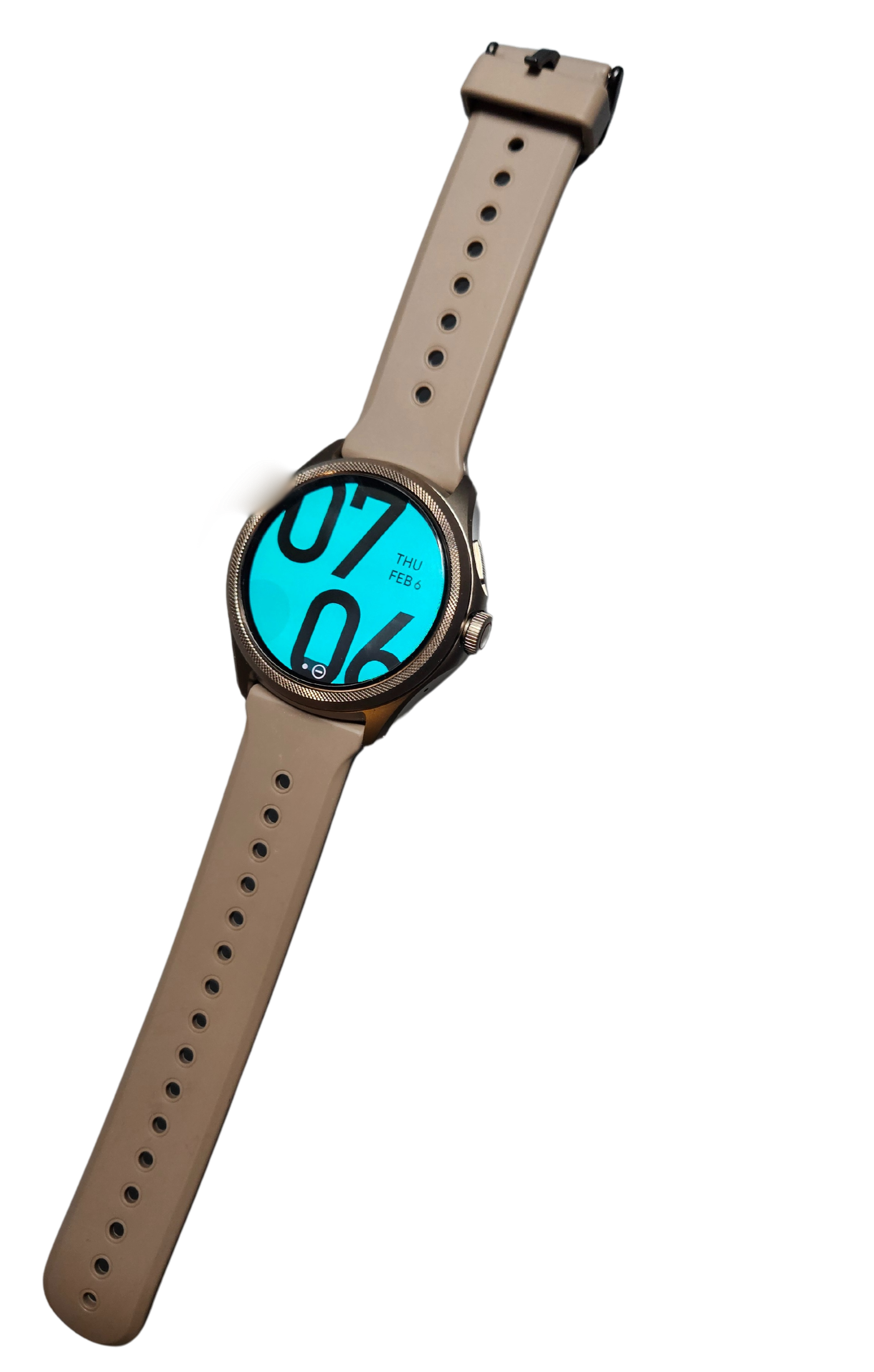
- A Ticwatch Pro 5 in the Sandstone color scheme.
- Manufacturer: Mobvoi Information Technology Company Limited
- Series: Ticwatch Pro
- Family: Ticwatch
- First released: May 5, 2023; 3 years ago
- Predecessor: Mobvoi Ticwatch Pro 3/Pro 3 Ultra
- Successor: Mobvoi Ticwatch Atlas
- Form factor: Circular
- Dimensions: 50.1×48.0×12.2 mm (1.97×1.89×0.48 in)
- Weight: 44.3 g (2 oz)
- Operating system: Wear OS 4.0
- System-on-chip: Snapdragon W5+ Gen 1
- Memory: 2 GB
- Storage: 32 GB
- Battery: 628 mAh
- Charging: Proprietary
- Display: 1.43 in (36 mm) circular AMOLED; 466x466 px
- Connectivity: Bluetooth 5.2, Wi-Fi: 2.4GHz
- Water resistance: 5ATM, MIL-STD-810H
- Other: GNSS, GPS, Beidou, Glonass, Galileo, QZSS

=== TicWatch Pro 5 ===
The Mobvoi Ticwatch Pro 5 was released on May 5, 2023. It was the first smartwatch to feature the new Snapdragon W5+ chipset, promising up to double the processing speed of the prior Pro 3. It features a larger display, 2 gigabytes of RAM, and a longer 48-hour always-on battery life. It launched with Wear OS 3.5, but was updated to Wear OS 4.0 in September 2024, which combined multiple of its proprietary fitness apps: TicBreathe, TicPulse, TicOxygen, and TicZen, into an updated and unified TicHealth app. In addition, it also improved automatic fitness tracking and added new exercise tracking modes.

Due to Google's outsourcing of the Wear OS system app to individual manufacturers, users with Wear OS 4 and above must also install the new Mobvoi Health app to control the watch instead of the 2 prior apps, Wear OS and Mobvoi App. In addition, due to a new security policy, it now requires a Google account to be logged in on the device for many features such as Google Calendar, Play Store, and Google Maps to function properly.

It was initially released in a single color, Obsidian, but later a Sandstone color scheme featuring beige accents was released with otherwise identical specifications. It was rated 4/5 by PCMag, who praised the dual-screen functionality, the resolution of the screen itself, and the battery life but criticized the lack of Google Assistant and cellular options, and 7/10 by The Verge, who praised the performance but was highly critical of the potential software support and delayed release of Wear OS 4.

=== Ticwatch Pro 5 Enduro ===
The Ticwatch Pro 5 Enduro is a version of the Ticwatch Pro 5 with a longer, 90-hour battery life. Physically identical to the Pro 5 save for a new scratch-resistant sapphire front glass, it launched with Wear OS 4.0.

=== Ticwatch Atlas ===
The Mobvoi Ticwatch Atlas is the successor to the Ticwatch Pro 5 Enduro and Pro 5. It features a redesigned bezel and side button, but is otherwise identical to the Enduro in other specifications.

== Discontinuation of Ticwatch ==
In December 2025, after a year of no new product releases or software updates, all Ticwatch listings were removed from Mobvoi's digital storefront and Amazon listings. A spokesperson responded to 9to5Google and stated that they had "no new information to announce about the TicWatch lineup" while confirming that “existing devices will continue to receive essential support.” They did not answer as to whether Ticwatch devices would ever receive Wear OS 5 or Wear OS 6.
