= Moto 360 =

Android smartwatch

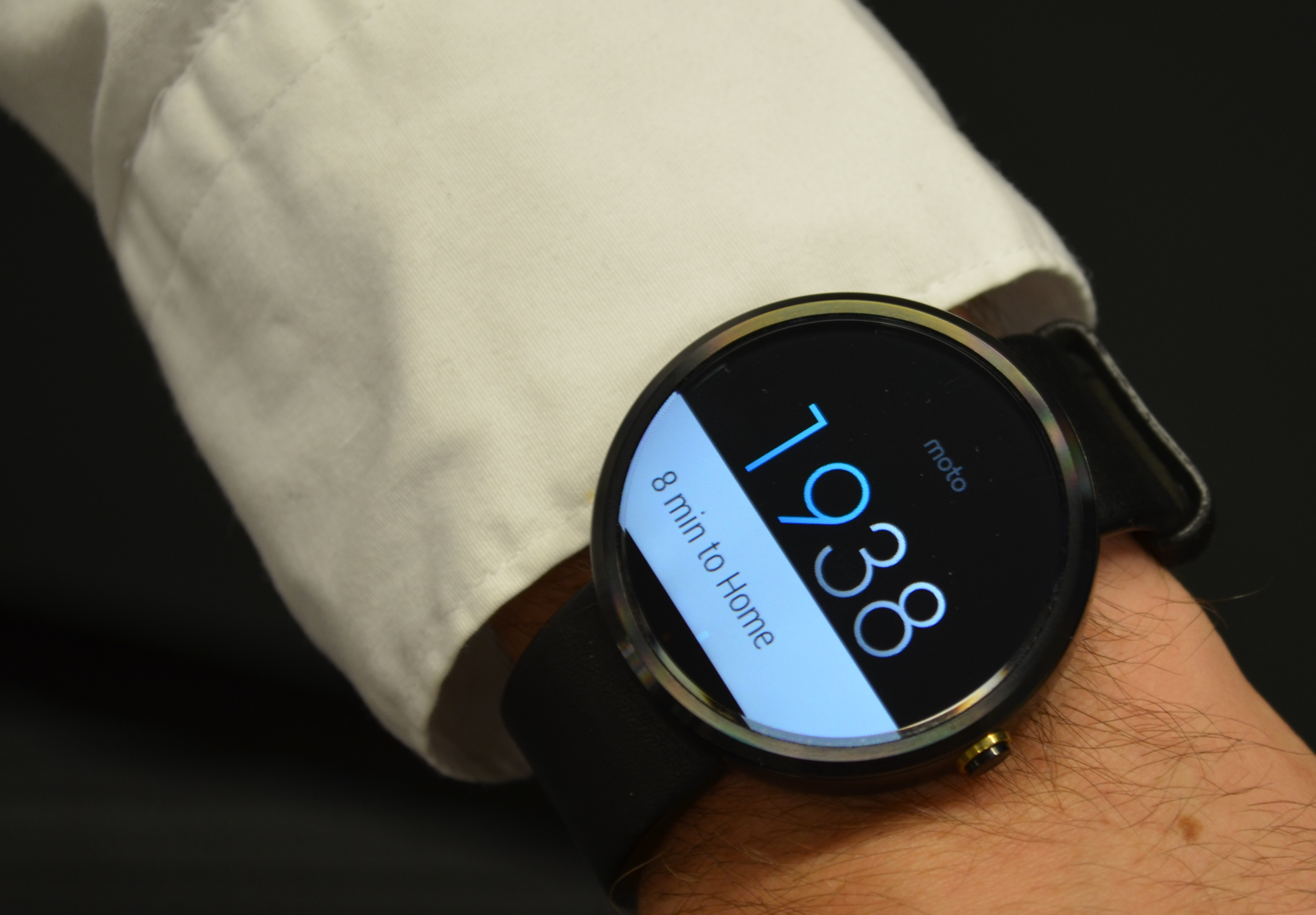
- Moto 360 1st generation
- Also known as: minnow
- Developer: Motorola Mobility eBuyNow (3rd generation)
- Type: Smartwatch
- Released: September 5, 2014 (1st); April 14, 2015 (2nd); December 2019 (3rd)
- Operating system: Wear OS
- System on a chip: 1st gen: TI OMAP 3630; 2nd gen: Qualcomm Snapdragon 400
- CPU: 1st gen: 1 GHz Cortex A8; 2nd gen: 1.2 GHz Cortex A7
- Memory: 512 MB LPDDR
- Storage: 4 GB
- Display: 1st gen: 1.56 in (40 mm) LCD with RGB matrix 320×290 pixels (205 ppi), Corning Gorilla Glass 3; 2nd gen: Always-on 1.37-inch circular backlit IPS display, 360 x 325p resolution, Corning Gorilla Glass 3 (42mm); 1.56-inch circular backlit IPS display, 360 x 330p resolution, Corning Gorilla Glass 3 (46mm)
- Graphics: 1st gen: PowerVR SGX 530; 2nd gen: Adreno 305
- Input: Capacitive touch Pedometer (9-axis sensor); Optical heart rate monitor Ambient light sensor Dual microphones
- Connectivity: Bluetooth Low Energy; WiFi 802.11 b/g
- Power: 320 mAh; All day (mixed use) wireless Qi charging
- Online services: Google Play, Google Now
- Dimensions: 46mm diameter by 11.5mm height
- Weight: 49 g (1.7 oz)
- Website: Moto 360

The Moto 360 is a discontinued Android Wear/Wear OS-based smartwatch developed by Motorola Mobility through three generations.

The original model was announced on March 18, 2014 and was released on September 5, 2014 in the US along with new models of the Moto X and the Moto G. The second generation was announced on September 14, 2015 at the IFA and was released with a starting price of US$300. It was discontinued by Motorola in February 2017. The Moto 360 was revived October 29, 2019 with the introduction of a third generation, albeit this one is not made by Motorola Mobility itself but by a Canadian company called eBuyNow under license.

== Hardware and design ==
The Moto 360's form factor is based on the circular design of traditional watches (also similar to the Huawei Watch and LG Watch Urbane), supporting a 40mm (1.5 in) viewing diameter and circular capacitive touch display. The case is stainless steel and available in different finishes. Removable wrist bands are available in metal and natural leather - these were more readily removable in the second generation Moto 360 as opposed to the first. The watch is water resistant and has only a single physical button.

The watch has an all day battery, and rather than needing to be plugged in, it charges wirelessly by being placed on an included cradle. Internally it has dual microphones for voice recognition and noise rejection and a vibration motor allowing tactile feedback. An ambient light sensor optimizes screen brightness and allows gesture controls such as blanking the screen by placing one's hand over it. Bluetooth 4.0 is included for connectivity and driving wireless headphones. In the June 2015 release notes, Motorola announced Wi-Fi support for the original Moto 360, such that it could be used out of Bluetooth range. A heart-rate sensor and 9-axis accelerometer support health and activity monitoring. It has IP67 certification for dust resistance and fresh water resistance rated at 30-minutes at 1.5 meters (4.9 feet) depth.

It has dual microphones for voice recognition and noise rejection and a vibration motor allowing tactile feedback. An ambient light sensor optimizes screen brightness and allows gesture controls such as dimming the screen by placing one's hand over it. Bluetooth 4.0 LE is included for connectivity and wireless accessories.

== Software ==
The Moto 360 runs Android Wear, later known as Wear OS, Google's proprietary Android-based platform specifically designed for wearable devices. It is able to be paired with devices running Android 4.3 Jelly Bean or higher and any iPhone running iOS 8 or higher. Its software displays notifications from paired phones. It uses paired phones to enable interactive features such as Google Now cards, search, navigation, playing music, and integration with apps such as fitness, EverNote, and others. The second generation Moto 360 shipped with Android Wear version 1.5 and is upgradable to version 2.0.

== Reception ==
Regarding the original Moto 360, Ars Technica criticized the "terrible" battery life and performance, blaming it on the outdated SoC (system-on-chip) used in the Moto 360: "Motorola inexplicably chose an ancient 1GHz single-core Texas Instruments OMAP 3". In a review for Engadget, Jon Fingas wrote, "The interface isn't that great at surfacing the information I need at the time I need it, for that matter. Spotify's Android Wear card always showed up on cue, but Sonos' controls appeared inconsistently even when there was music playing. And the watch frequently defaulted to showing apps that weren't really relevant to the situation at hand; no, I don't need to check out my fitness goals in the middle of the workday. Google may be right that watches are primarily about receiving passive streams of information, but that doesn't excuse doing a poor job when I want to be more active." He concluded, "Even with those quirks in mind, it's pretty clear the Moto 360 has turned a corner in half a year's time. It's no longer the underdeveloped novelty that it was on launch, and it's now my pick of the current Android Wear crop. True, it doesn't have the G Watch R's true circular display, the ZenWatch's custom software or the Sony Smartwatch 3's GPS, but I'd say of the three, it strikes the best balance between looks, functionality and price."

Impressions of the second generation Moto 360 were generally positive, especially in comparison to its predecessor, however the limitations of Android Wear concerned some critics. In contrasting the industrial design with the software, Dan Seifert of The Verge noted "if you buy the Moto 360 smartwatch, you’re paying more for the watch than you are for the smart". The Guardian gave the device four out of five stars, concluding that "it’s no more capable than almost any other Android Wear watch" despite having "fluid performance" and being more comfortable than the first generation.

== See also ==
- Motoactv
- Wearable computer
- Microsoft Band
- Apple Watch
- Pebble
