= Sony Ericsson LiveView =

Wearable device

- Manufacturer: Sony Ericsson
- Released: December 2010
- Successor: Sony SmartWatch
- Website: www.sonymobile.com/global-en/support/accessories/liveview/

The Sony Ericsson LiveView is a wearable device that connects to an Android phone and can display Twitter feeds, RSS feeds, SMS, control the phone's media player, and is capable of running third-party plugins obtainable from Google's Play Store. At launch it was compatible with Android devices running version 2.1 and above.

LiveView comes with a belt clip and watch band and features a 128x128 OLED display, and Bluetooth radio.

LiveView was introduced on 28 September 2010 and released by the end of the year.

== See also ==
- Smartwatch
- Wearable computer
- Sony SmartWatch
- Pebble watch
- Omate TrueSmart
