= Wear OS =

Smartwatch operating system by Google

- Screenshot of Wear OS 6, based on Android 16 with the Classic watch face applied
- Developer: Google
- Written in: C (core), C++, Java
- OS family: Android (Unix-like)
- Working state: Current
- Source model: Closed-source
- Initial release: March 18, 2014; 12 years ago
- Latest release: Wear OS 7 (based on Android 17) / 16 June 2026; 5 months ago
- Marketing target: Smartwatches
- Available in: 93 languages: Azərbaycan - Azerbaijani Bosanski - Bosnian Català - Catalan Čeština - Czech Dansk - Danish Deutsch (Deutschland) - German (Germany) Deutsch (Österreich) - German (Austria) Deutsch (Schweiz) - German (Switzerland) Eesti - Estonian English (Australia) - English (Australia) English (Canada) - English (Canada) English (Ireland) - English (Ireland) English (New Zealand) - English (New Zealand) English (Philippines) - English (Philippines) English (South Africa) - English (South Africa) English (United Kingdom) - English (United Kingdom) English (United States) - English (United States) Español (España) - Spanish (Spain) Español (Estados Unidos) - Spanish (United States) Euskara - Basque Filipino - Filipino Français (Belgique) - French (Belgium) Français (Canada) - French (Canada) Français (France) - French (France) Français (Suisse) - French (Switzerland) Gaeilge - Irish Galego - Galician Hrvatski - Croatian Indonesia - Indonesian Íslenska - Icelandic Italiano - Italian Latviešu - Latvian Lietuvių - Lithuanian Magyar - Hungarian Melayu - Malay Nederlands (België) - Dutch (Belgium) Nederlands (Nederland) - Dutch (Netherlands) Norsk bokmål - Norwegian Bokmål O‘zbek - Uzbek (Latin) Polski (Polska) - Polish (Poland) Polski (Silesian) - Polish (Silesian) Português (Brasil) - Portuguese (Brazil) Português (Portugal) - Portuguese (Portugal) Română - Romanian Shqip - Albanian Slovenčina - Slovak Slovenščina - Slovenian Srpski - Serbian (Latin) Suomi - Finnish Svenska - Swedish Tiếng Việt - Vietnamese Türkçe - Turkish Türkmen dili - Turkmen Ελληνικά - Greek Беларуская - Belarusian Български - Bulgarian Кыргызча - Kyrgyz Қазақ тілі - Kazakh Македонски - Macedonian Монгол - Mongolian Русский - Russian Тоҷикӣ - Tajik Українська - Ukrainian ქართული - Georgian Հայերեն - Armenian עברית - Hebrew اردو - Urdu العربية - Arabic فارسی - Persian नेपाली - Nepali मराठी - Marathi हिन्दी - Hindi অসমীয়া - Assamese বাংলা (বাংলাদেশ) - Bangla (Bangladesh) বাংলা (ভারত) - Bangla (India) ਪੰਜਾਬੀ - Punjabi ગુજરાતી - Gujarati ଓଡ଼ିଆ - Odia தமிழ் - Tamil తెలుగు - Telugu ಕನ್ನಡ - Kannada മലയാളം - Malayalam සිංහල - Sinhala ไทย - Thai ລາວ - Lao မြန်မာ (Unicode) - Burmese (Unicode) မြန်မာ (Zawgyi) - Burmese (Zawgyi) ខ្មែរ - Khmer 한국어 - Korean 日本語 - Japanese 简体中文 (中国) - Simplified Chinese (China) 繁體中文 (台灣) - Traditional Chinese (Taiwan) 繁體中文 (香港) - Traditional Chinese (Hong Kong); Language list as of Wear OS 3.0
- Update method: Over-the-air or phone companion app
- Package manager: APK via Google Play
- Supported platforms: 32-bit ARM, x86
- Kernel type: Monolithic (modified Linux kernel)
- Userland: Bionic libc, shell from NetBSD, native core utilities with a few from NetBSD
- Influenced by: Android
- Default user interface: Graphical (Multi-touch)
- License: Proprietary
- Official website: wearos.google.com

Wear OS (Note: Also known simply as Wear) (formerly Android Wear) is a closed-source Android distribution designed for smartwatches and other wearable computers, created and developed by Google. Wear OS is designed to pair with mobile phones running Android (version 6.0 "Marshmallow" or newer) or iOS (version 10.0 or newer), providing mobile notifications into a smartwatch form factor and integration with the Google Assistant technology.

Wear OS supports Bluetooth, NFC, Wi-Fi, 3G, 4G, and LTE connectivity, as well as a range of features and applications provided through Google Play. Watch face styles include round, square and rectangular. Hardware manufacturing partners include Asus, Broadcom, Fossil, HTC, Intel, LG, MediaTek, Imagination Technologies, Motorola, OnePlus, Google, New Balance, Xiaomi, Qualcomm, Samsung, Huawei, Skagen, Polar, TAG Heuer, Suunto, and Mobvoi.

The operating system was first released in 2014 as Android Wear, and took its current name in 2018. Analysts estimate that over 720,000 Android Wear smartwatches were shipped in 2014, the year of its launch. By mid-October 2022, the Wear OS app had more than 50 million downloads. Wear OS was estimated to account for 17.3% of the smartwatch market in Q3 2021, behind Apple's 21.8%. As of 2025, Samsung accounts for the majority of Wear OS devices sold, due to its switch back from Tizen to Wear OS in 2021.

== History and compatibility ==
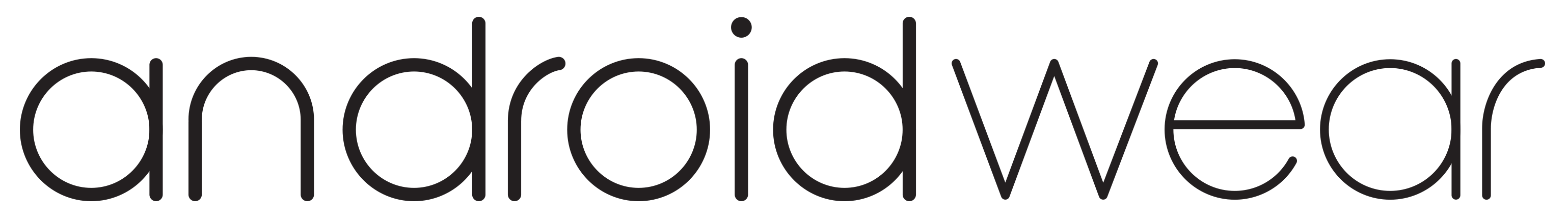
Logo for Android Wear, the previous name of the operating system

The platform was announced on March 18, 2014, along with the release of a developer preview. At the same time, companies such as Motorola, Samsung, LG, HTC and Asus were announced as partners. On June 25, 2014, at Google I/O, the Samsung Gear Live and LG G Watch were launched, along with further details about Android Wear. The LG G Watch is the first Android Wear smartwatch to be released and shipped. Motorola's Moto 360 was released on September 5, 2014.

On December 10, 2014, an update started to roll out, adding new features including a watch face API and changed the software to be based on Android 5.0 "Lollipop".

The LG G Watch and Samsung Gear Live started shipping in July 2014, while the Motorola Moto 360 began shipping in September 2014. The next batch of Android Wear devices, which arrived at the end of 2014, included the Asus ZenWatch, the Sony SmartWatch 3, and the LG G Watch R. As of March 2015, the latest Wear OS devices are the LG Watch Urbane, and the Huawei Watch.

On August 31, 2015, Google launched a Wear OS app for iOS version 8.2 or newer, allowing limited support for receiving iOS notifications on smartwatches running Wear OS. As of September 2015, only the LG Watch Urbane and Huawei Watch are supported, but Google announced support for more smartwatch models.

In March 2018, Android Wear was rebranded as Wear OS. It was stated that the renaming "better reflects our technology, vision, and most important of all — the people who wear our watches." In September 2018, Google announced Wear OS 2.0, which made the personalized Google feed (replacing Google Now) and new fitness tracking platform Google Fit accessible from the watch face, and redesigned the notification area to use a scrolling pane rather than pages, and support automatically generated smart replies (as on Android Pie). In November 2018, the underlying platform of Wear OS was upgraded to a version of Android Pie.

In January 2021, Google completed its acquisition of wearables manufacturer Fitbit; upon its announcement of the purchase in November 2019, Google's head of hardware Rick Osterloh stated that it would be "an opportunity to invest even more in Wear OS as well as introduce Made by Google wearable devices into the market."

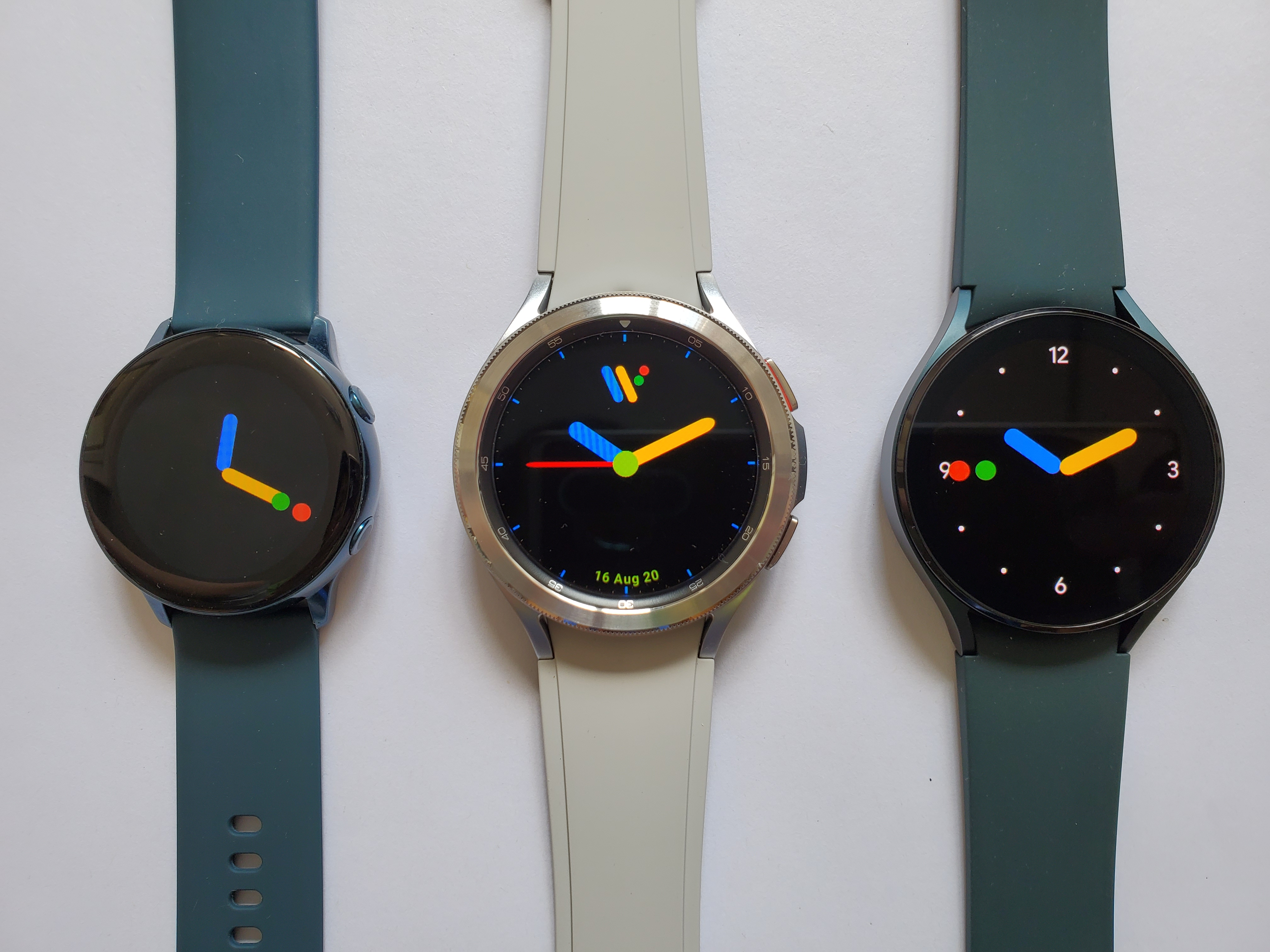
Wear OS devices by Samsung

In May 2021 at Google I/O, Google announced a major update to the platform, internally known as Wear OS 3.0. It incorporates a new visual design inspired by Android 12, and Fitbit exercise tracking features. Google also announced a partnership with Samsung Electronics, who is collaborating with Google to unify its Tizen-based smartwatch platform with Wear OS, and has committed to using Wear OS on its future smartwatch products. The underlying codebase was also upgraded to Android 11. Wear OS 3.0 will be available to Wear OS devices running Qualcomm Snapdragon Wear 4100 system on chip, and will be an opt-in upgrade requiring a factory reset to install.

== Features ==
Wear OS can synchronize notifications from a paired device, and supports voice control with the "OK Google" hotword along with gesture-based input. Wear OS integrates with Google services such as the Google Assistant and Google Mobile Services (including Gmail, Google Maps, and Google Wallet), as well as third-party watch apps from Play Store. From the watch face, the user can swipe up to access their notifications, down to access a quick settings panel, from the left to view their personalized Google feed, and the right to view Google Fit. Via Google Fit and similar applications, Wear OS supports ride and run tracking, and devices containing heart rate sensors can perform a reading on-demand, or at intervals throughout the day. The watch can control media being played or streamed on paired devices.

== Version history ==
=== Android Wear ===
Android Wear version	Android OS version	Release date	New features	Notes
4.4W1	4.4 KitKat	June 2014	Initial release	Announced at Google I/O 2014
4.4W2	4.4 KitKat	October 2014	Offline music playback over Bluetooth; Watch GPS support (for watches with built-in GPS); New music control UI	
1.0 (5.0.1W)	5.0.1 Lollipop	December 2014	Official watch face API; Sunlight mode (brightness boost); Theater mode; Settings shade from top; Battery stats in Android Wear app; Recently used actions added to the top in drawer; Ability to undo dismissed notification	Numbering scheme changed to be independent from underlying Android OS version
1.1 (5.1.1W1)	5.1.1 Lollipop	May 2015	Wi-Fi support (for watches with built-in Wi-Fi); Drawable Emojis (as response to messages); Heads up notifications; Pattern lock screen; Ability to change font size; Add swipe left from watch face to access app drawer; Always on apps; More wrist gestures	
1.3 (5.1.1W2)	5.1.1 Lollipop	August 2015	Interactive watch faces; Google Translate for Wear	
1.4 (6.0.1W1)	6.0.1 Marshmallow	February 2016	More wrist gestures; Speaker support for watches with built-in speaker; Send voice messages directly from the watch	
1.5 (6.0.1W2)	6.0.1 Marshmallow	June 2016	Brought back restart watch option; Added Android security patch level to About screen	
2.0 (7.1.1W1)	7.1.1 Nougat	Feb 2017	Revamped UI with Material Design, darker colors, and a more circular user interface for round watches.; Standalone apps with Google Play Store on watch; Complications for watch faces; Built-in keyboard; Handwriting recognition; Stackable notifications; Smarter notifications; Cellular Support	
2.6 (7.1.1W2)	7.1.1 Nougat	Nov 2017	Text size of notifications adapts to message length; New download progress indicator; New complication for launching previously used app	
2.6 (7.1.1W3, 8.0.0 W1)	8.0 Oreo	Dec 2017	Brings Android 8.0 Oreo features to smartwatches: Notification vibration strength setting; Touch lock option for wet conditions; Support for 7 new countries/languages; Notification Channels; Battery saving background limits	
2.7 (7.1.1W4, 8.0.0 W2)	8.0 Oreo	Dec 2017	Improved typefaces and font weights; Complications now work with Talkback; Text size of notifications adapts to message length; Swipe down in Quick Settings to see connection type (Wi-Fi, Bluetooth, or mobile); Download progress notifications; Recent App complication; Better prevention of accidental side-swipe and long-press gestures	
2.8 (7.1.1W5, 8.0.0W3)	8.0 Oreo	Jan 2018	Improved notification glanceability with a new layout which shows more of the user's message at a glance; Darker background for better readability and less battery usage	
2.9 (7.1.1W6, 8.0.0W4)	8.0 Oreo	Feb 2018	New notification preview complication which allows you to preview messages; Improved glanceability in notification cards with longer titles	

=== Wear OS ===
==== Wear OS 1 and 2 ====
Wear OS version	Android OS versions	Release date	New features	Notes
1.0	Android 8 Oreo	March 2018	Rebranding to Wear OS; Expand Google Pay Support in more countries	Version number reset to "1.0". Wear OS App version: 2.10
1.4	Android 8 Oreo	July 2018	Faster Google Pay startup; More glanceable design for events and appointments; Time zone sync bug fix	Wear OS App version: 2.14
2.0	Android 8 Oreo	September 2018	Swipe actions for faster access to Google Assistant and Google Fit; Google Assistant feed with proactive personalized information; New design for quick toggles and notifications stream; New music controls with physical button support; Bolder font in the app launcher	Wear OS App version: 2.18
2.2	Android 9 Pie H MR1	November 2018	New features for System version H MR1: Brings Android 9.0 Pie features to smartwatches; Enables Battery Saver mode to only display the time once the battery falls below 10%; Improves restoring the state of previously used apps; Watches now enter a deep sleep mode after 30 minutes of inactivity; Holding down the power button now provides options for shutting down or restarting the watch	Wear OS App version: 2.20
2.6	Android 9 Pie H MR1	May 2019	Tiles functionality when swiping left, providing access to next calendar events, weather forecast, heart rate, news headlines and timer functionality	Wear OS App version: 2.24
2.7	Android 9 Pie H MR1	June 2019	Bug fixes	Wear OS App version: 2.25
2.9	Android 9 Pie H MR1	July 2019	Notifications	Wear OS App version: 2.26
2.17	Android 9 Pie H MR1	April 2020	New 'Wash hands' timer regarding coronavirus; New UI and Tiles for Google Fit	Wear OS App Version: 2.35
2.23	Android 9 Pie H MR2	December 2020	Changes in System H MR2: CPU core improvements: app launch and boot time up to 20% faster; SysUI improvements: more intuitive controls for managing different watch modes and workouts; Increased performance with the Qualcomm Snapdragon Wear 4100 and 4100+ platforms; Improved LTE support; Simplified pairing process; Better battery life; Support for an increased numbers of Tiles; New Weather Tile; Ability to turn off Long Press Power Button to activate Google Assistant; Ability to set the screen off time limit; New screen brightness layout; YouTube Music App; Google Fit: Workouts & Breathe Tiles + New home screen & New Sleep features; Social share and challenge	Wear OS App version: 2.41

==== Wear OS 3 and later ====
Wear OS version	Android OS versions	Release date	New features
3.0	Android 11	August 2021	Brings Android 11 features to smartwatches: New UI design; Health features to Google Fit: Stress management; Compatible ECG app; Skin temperature; SpO2 levels; Sleep tracking; Wake up; Hardware improvements: Long battery life with Bluetooth improvements (up to a week); Social integration: Social challenges
3.2	Android 11	February 2022	App drawer and notification tray icons tweaked
3.5	Android 11	October 2022	Integration with Fitbit; Improved Google Assistant; Added new watch faces; Removed: Compatibility with iPhones
4.0	Android 13	July 2023	Material You; Animated Tiles; New XML watch face format (Watch Face Format); Improved battery life; Native backups; App permission syncing with connected phone; More granular permission handling for health data; Improved golf tracking
5.0	Android 14	19 July 2024	Grid-based app launcher; Media output device choices; Watch Face Format enhancements; Screenshot detection; Health Services updates
5.1	Android 15	19 March 2025	Force Global AOD Experience; Active watch face tweak; New accent color; Settings > Modes; Improved step tracking algorithm; Media Controls Upgrade
6.0	Android 16	22 July 2025	Introduced Material 3 Expressive UI
6.1	Android 16	9 December 2025	New gesture controls; Improves Smart Replies
7.0	Android 17	16 June 2026	Introduced Wear Widgets; Introduced Live Updates for Wear OS

== See also ==
- List of Wear OS devices
- Android
- Android Auto
- Android TV
- AsteroidOS
- Google Glass
- watchOS
- Facer.io
