= Huawei Watch =

Smartwatch by Huawei

Huawei Watch Series
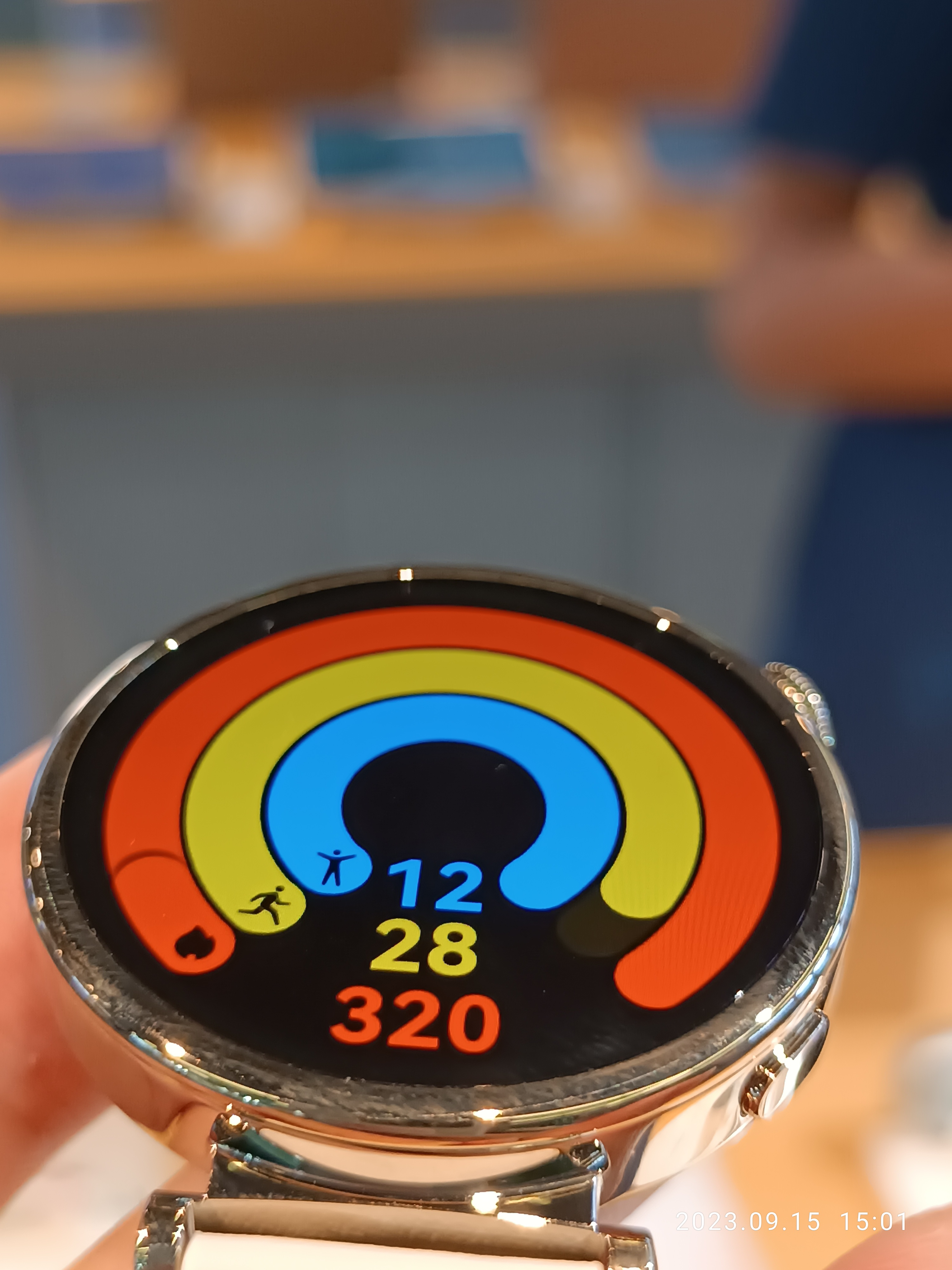
- Developer: Huawei
- Manufacturer: Huawei
- Type: Smartwatch
- Released: First generation September 2, 2015; 11 years ago with Android Wear
- Operating system: HarmonyOS
- Connectivity: Bluetooth; Wi-Fi
- Online services: AppGallery, HMS Core
- Website: consumer.huawei.com/uk/wearables/watch-3/

The Huawei Watch and latest Huawei Watch 4 series are HarmonyOS-based (formerly Android Wear and LiteOS-based) smartwatches developed by Huawei. The Huawei Watch is the first smartwatch produced by Huawei. It was announced at the 2015 Mobile World Congress and released at IFA Berlin on September 2. The Huawei Watch 3 was introduced in June 2021 after the United States Department of Commerce added Huawei to its Entity List in May 2019.

== Hardware ==
First generation Huawei Watch's form factor is based on the circular design of traditional watches, supporting a 42 mm (1.4 inch) AMOLED screen. The screen's resolution is 400 x 400 pixels and 285.7 ppi. The case is 316L stainless steel, covered with sapphire crystal glass in front and available in six finishes: Black Leather, Steel Link Bracelet, Stainless Steel Mesh, Black-plated Link Bracelet, Alligator-pressed Brown Leather, and Rose Gold-plated Link Bracelet.

The watch uses a 1.2 GHz Qualcomm Snapdragon 400 APQ8026 processor. All versions of the Huawei Watch have 512MB of RAM and 4GB of internal storage, along with a gyroscope, accelerometer, vibration motor, and heart rate sensor. It supports Wi-Fi and Bluetooth 4.1 LE, and support for GPS locating. The watch uses a magnetic charging cradle, with a day and a half of battery life.

== Software ==
The first generation Huawei Watch runs on the Android Wear operating system. It works with iOS (8.2 and later) and Android (4.3 and later) devices. It currently supports Google Now voice commands and is compatible with Wear OS. The watch can process calls and receive messages and emails.

== Reception ==
In Tech Advisor's review, Chris Martin wrote, "This is a great looking smartwatch, although it is quite large. Specs match other Android Wear smartwatches but we're worried about the small battery." The President of Huawei U.S., Xu Zhejiang, said, "It embodies Huawei's technology innovation heritage, pursuit of premium design, and integration of useful functionality that we strive to develop in each product." The Phandroid said, "it is the classiest Android Wear smartwatch available right now".

== Versions ==
In March 2020, Huawei announced the Huawei Watch GT 2e powered by Huawei's proprietary OS. It launched in India in May 2020. The smartwatch features the same 1.39-inch AMOLED touch display with a 454 x 454p resolution. It is powered by Huawei’s in-house Kirin A1 chipset along with GPS and Bluetooth audio that has 4GB of onboard storage. The onboard software can track over 100 different sports and exercises. The watch also features oxygen saturation monitoring with an SpO2 sensor that can calculate the wearer's maximum rate of oxygen consumption.

Huawei Watch GT 2 Pro released September 2020 powered by LiteOS In June 2021, Huawei announced the Huawei Watch 3 running on HarmonyOS 2.0. Huawei launched the Huawei Watch GT 3 SE on October 29, 2022, intended as a more cost-effective iteration of their Watch GT3 Pro. The watch targets customers who seek a more budget-friendly option. Initially, the Huawei Watch GT 3 SE will be on the market for only Vietnam and Poland, with plans for a later release in other regions. The model is available in two colors, black and green, and is priced at around €170 in Poland.

As a successor to the Huawei Watch GT 3, Huawei launched Watch GT 4 and Watch Ultimate Design on 25 September, 2023 alongside Watch 4 released earlier in the year in June 2023. This version runs on HarmonyOS 4 and works with HarmonyOS, Android and iOS smartphones. Huawei Watch Fit 3 successor to Huawei Watch Fit (2020) and Huawei Watch Fit 2 (2022) series, announced and released on May 7, 2024 with a smaller screen and HarmonyOS 4.2 preinstalled.

Huawei Watch 5 was announced in 2025. The Huawei Watch 5 is a stylish watch and has several health tracking features utilising AI with HarmonyOS 5.1 built in. It is available in two sizes: 46mm and 42mm, with the larger model featuring a titanium case and the smaller one offering a stainless steel option. One of the standout features of the Huawei Watch 5 is its X-Tap sensor, which allows users to perform health scans such as including heart rate, ECG, and respiratory health.

The Huawei Watch 5 is compatible with both iOS and Android devices, making it versatile for users across different platforms However, it lacks extensive third-party app support, which limits its functionality compared to other smartwatches such as the Apple Watch or those running Google's Wear OS. The watch is priced starting at £399 for the 46mm model and is not available in the United States due to restrictions.

Next in the series: the HUAWEI WATCH 6 was announced in September 2026 as part of Huawei's smartwatch lineup. The device features a design available in two sizes, 46 mm and 42 mm, with AMOLED displays protected by sapphire glass. It runs in Huawei's HarmonyOS operating system and incorporates several health and fitness tracking features, including heart rate monitoring, electrocardiogram (ECG) measurements, and the X-TAP sensor system, which enables users to access multiple hearth indicators.

The WATCH 6 supports eSIM connectivity and is compatible with both Android and iOS devices. It also includes various sports and fitness tracking modes, alongside features designed to monitor physical activity and overall health. Battery life varies depending on the model and usage conditions, with the 46 mm version offering up to 4.5 days of typical use and the 42 mm version providing up to 3 days. However, access to third-party applications remains more limited than on competing smartwatches running Apple's watchOS or Google's WearOS.

Also, on August 31st 2026, Huawei unveiled the Huawei WATCH D3 in Munich, Germany a device that addresses a key gap in wearable technology as it is the worlds first device that measures exercise- related blood pressure that complies with ISO standards. This device accurately records data before and after physical activity, provides personalized recommendations on intensity and helps build sustainable exercise habits, with high clinical grade accuracy, event at high heart rates.

== See also ==
- Wearable computer
- Microsoft Band
- Apple Watch
- Pebble
