= Sony SmartWatch =

Line of smartwatches by Sony

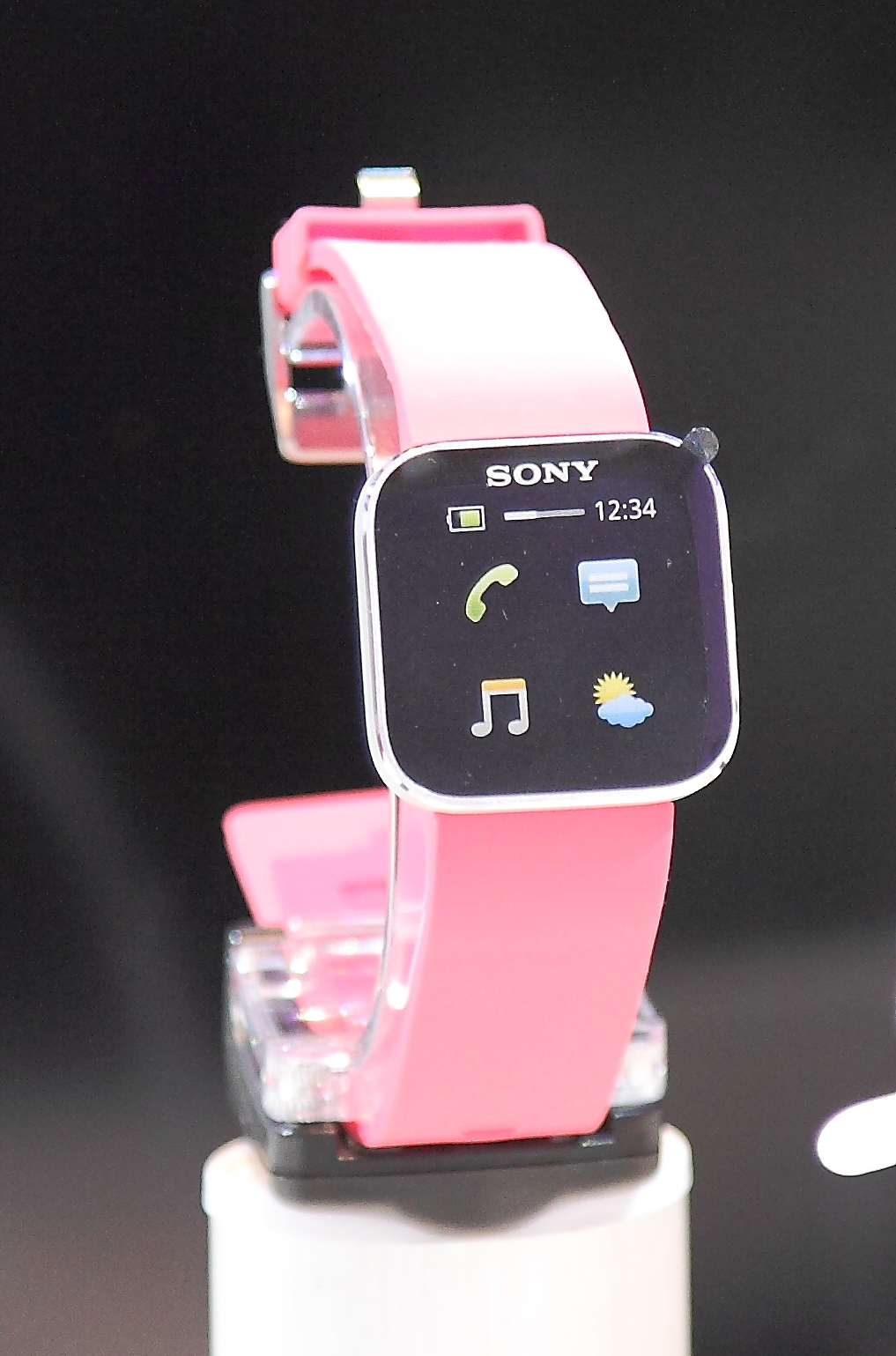
The original "MN2" Sony SmartWatch from 2012

The Sony SmartWatch is a line of wearable devices developed and sold by Sony Mobile from 2012 to 2016 through three generations. They connect to Android smartphones and can display information such as Twitter feeds and SMS messages, among other things.

== Original ==
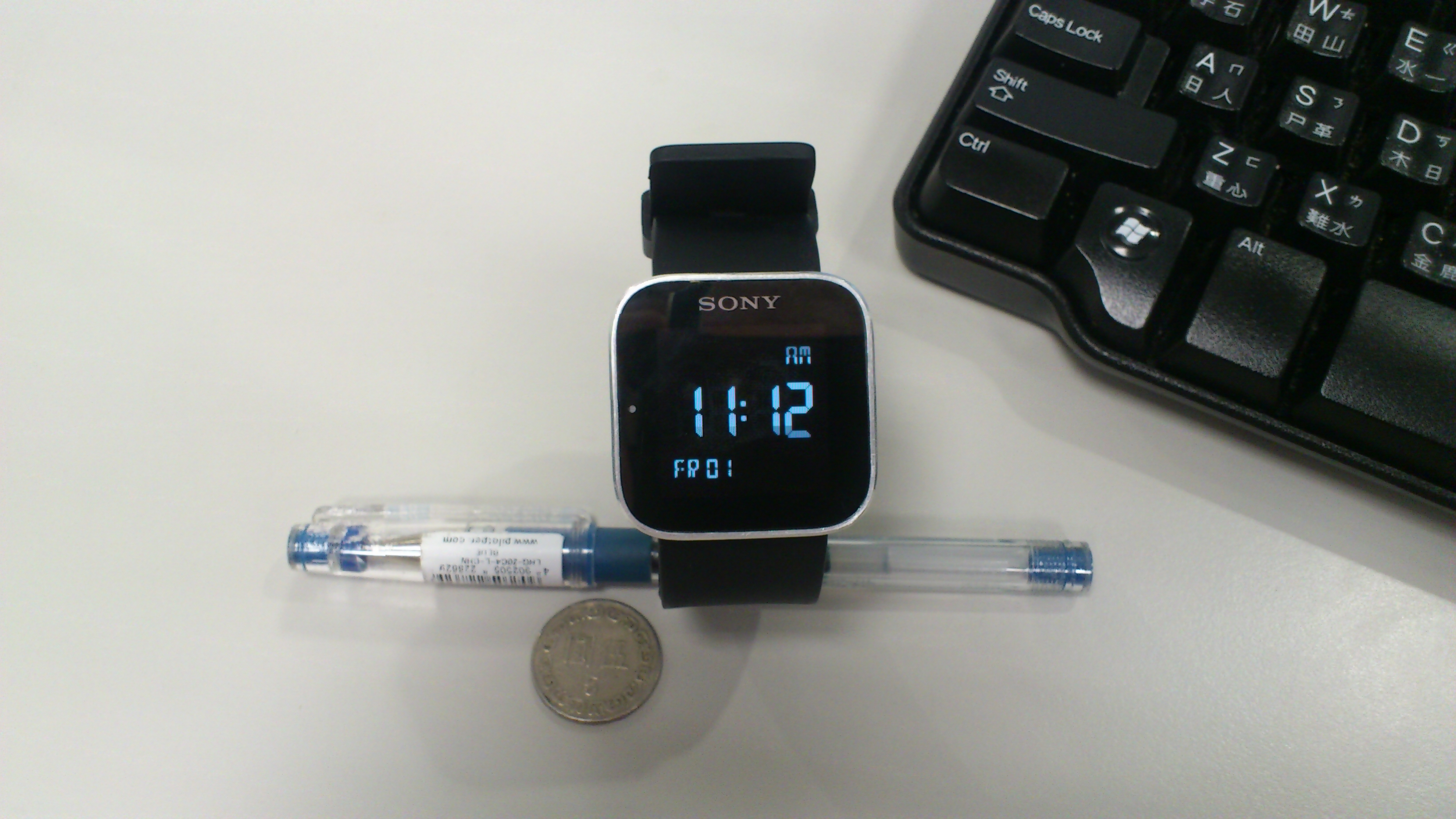
Sony SmartWatch MN2

The original Sony SmartWatch, model MN2SW, came with a flexible silicone wristband with multiple colors available. It was introduced at Consumer Electronics Show 2012 and launched later in March 2012.

== Sony SmartWatch 2 ==
The Sony SmartWatch 2, model SW2, was launched in late September 2013. The SW2 supported working together with any Android 4.0 (and higher) smartphone, unlike Samsung's competing Galaxy Gear smartwatch, which only worked with some of Samsung's own Galaxy handsets. The watch featured an aluminum body and came with the option of a silicone or metal wristband, but could be used with any 24mm wristband. It was 1.65 inches tall by 1.61 inches wide by 0.35 inch thick, weighed 0.8 ounces and sported a transflective LCD screen with a 220x176 resolution. The SW2 connected to the smartphone using Bluetooth, and supported NFC for easy pairing. It was rated IP57 so it could be submersed in water up to a meter for 30 minutes and was dust resistant.

== Sony SmartWatch 3 ==
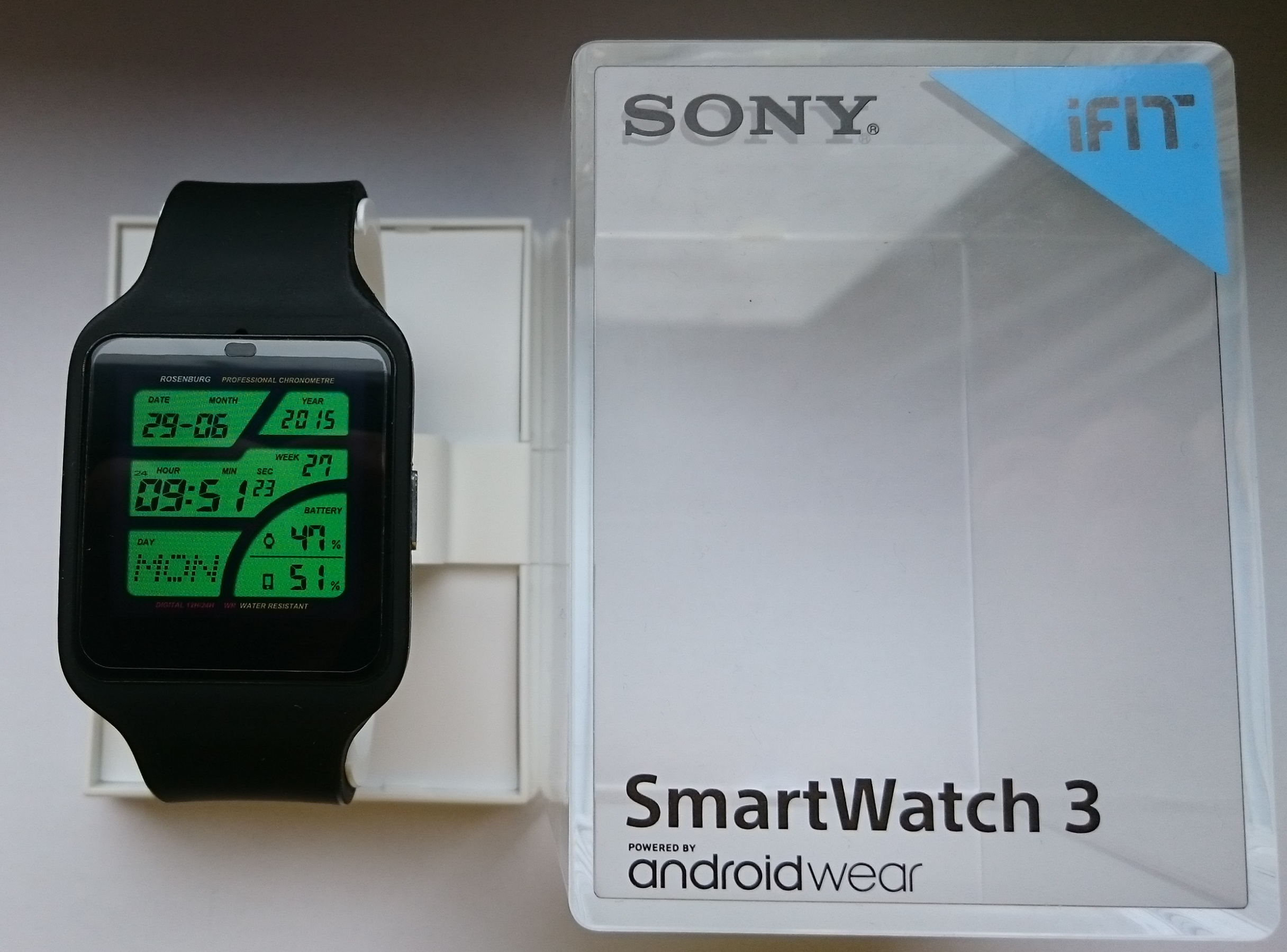
SmartWatch 3

At IFA Berlin 2014 the company announced the Sony Smartwatch 3. Its processor switched from previous generations' ARM Cortex-M MCU to an ARM Cortex-A CPU.

As noted by ABI Research, "The SmartWatch 3 has many new features such as waterproof (IP68 rated, not just resistant), improved styling, transition to Android Wear, and introduction of a new wearable platform from Broadcom. ... [It's] based on the Broadcom system-on-chip (SoC) platform which includes a 1.2GHz Quad-core ARM Cortex A7 processor (BCM23550), an improved GPS and ambient light sensor processing SoC (BCM47531) capable of simultaneously tracking five satellite systems (GPS, GLONASS, QZSS, SBAS, and BeiDou), the now popular Wi-Fi 802.11n/BT/NFC/FM quad-combo connectivity chip (BCM43341), and a highly integrated power management IC (BCM59054)."

Several apps are capable of using the Smartwatch 3's GPS, including:

- Google MyTracks (since 2014, December)
- RunKeeper (since 2014, December)
- Endomondo (since 2015, March)
- iFit
- Ghostracer (can upload to Strava)
- Strava (Beta)
- Rambler

The watch is also capable of tracking swimming with swim.com and golf swings with vimoGolf.

The Sony SmartWatch 3 will not be upgraded to version 2.0 of Android Wear.

== Model comparison ==
Product	Launch Date	CPU	Connectivity	Display	OS	Memory	Battery Capacity	Dimensions	Weight
Sony SmartWatch (MN2)	March 2012		Bluetooth v3.0	1.3" OLED display 128 x 128 pixels 65k (16 bits) color	Micrium uC/OS-II		472 mAh (46mm) 270 mAh (42mm)	36 mm (1.4 in) H 36 mm (1.4 in) W 8 mm (0.31 in) D 12.8 mm (0.50 in) D (includes clip)	15.5 g (0.55 oz) main unit 26 g (0.92 oz) watchband
Sony SmartWatch (SW2)	September 2013		Bluetooth v3.0, NFC	1.6", 220x176	Android Wear	4GB (2 and 3)	340 mAh	42 x 9 x 41 mm	122.5 g (4.32 oz) total
Sony SmartWatch 3 (SWR50)	November 2014	Broadcom 1.2 GHz Quad-core ARM Cortex A7 processor	Bluetooth 4.0 LE, NFC, Wi-Fi		Android Wear	eMMC 4 GB, 512MB RAM	247 mAh (30mm) 361 mAh (34mm)		

== See also ==
- Smartwatch
- Pebble (watch)
- Moto 360 (2nd generation), a smartwatch by Motorola
- Sony Ericsson LiveView
- Samsung Galaxy Gear
