= Yahoo Beijing Global R&D Center =

Yahoo Beijing Global R&D Center was one of three global Yahoo R&D Centers.

== History ==
It was founded in June 2009. The center conducts research in four areas: personalization, advertising, mobile and cloud computing. It employs almost 400 full-time researchers and engineers. The center operates under a mission of Platform as a service (PaaS) through a combination of science and engineering.

The center maintains a research agenda that concentrates on four areas:

- Personalization–research on modeling content understanding, user behavior, and interests, as well as machine-learning ranking. The research sought to improve to select, match and sort contents and to understand what users like. A learning infrastructure was built to support the engineering life cycle: streamline the steps from user activity instrumentation to signal collection and processing, feature extraction, model training, offline evaluation, and online bucket testing.
- Advertising–research on targeted advertising, real-time bidding and search advertising.
- Mobile–research on mobile backend services, application and mobile SDK(basic building blocks).
- Cloud computing–infrastructure to build big data platforms that enable next-generation mathematical models, real-time insights and predictive analytics, by improving service containers to scale only horizontally and vertically across abstraction layers. The next-generation data storage system supports multi-petabyte scale data, and offers storage services to Yahoo Mail, Yahoo Messenger and Flickr.

== University relations ==
=== Hack day ===
On May 19, 2013, Yahoo Beijing R&D Hack Day was held in Beijing, the first in mainland China. This event attracted thousands of university students. Through 24-hour competition, three students from Tsing Hua Universities and Zhejiang Universities won the champions with the project of "Easy Travel".

On November 8, 2005, Yahoo organized the first "Hack Day". Originally it was a competition of skills and creativity as well as entertaining activities only for Yahoo employees.
