= Asus ZenWatch =

Smartwatch

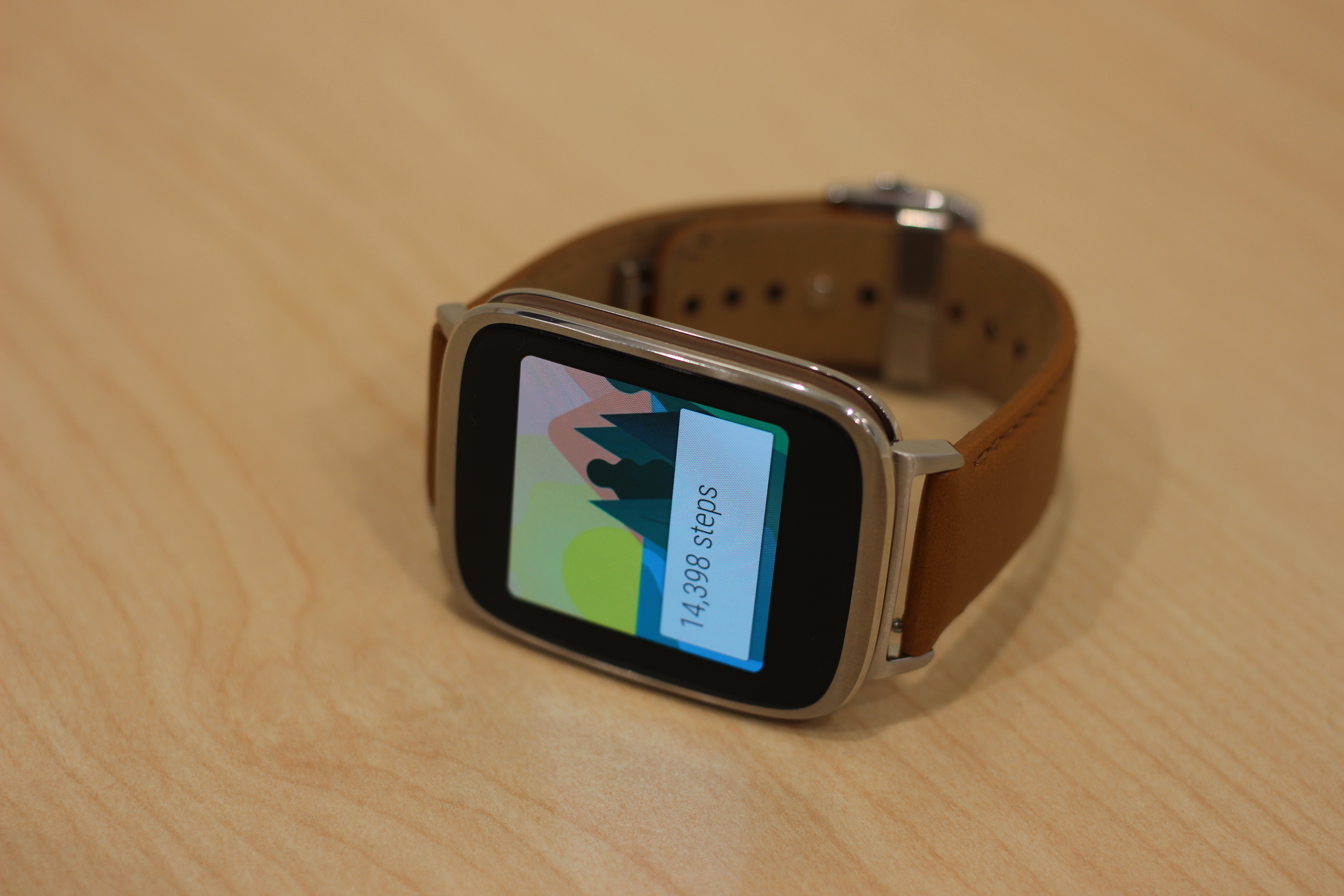
- Also known as: WI500Q
- Developer: Asus
- Type: Smartwatch
- Released: 9 November 2014; 11 years ago
- Discontinued: yes
- Operating system: Original: Android 4.4W.2; Current: Android Wear 6.0.1
- System on a chip: Qualcomm Snapdragon 400
- CPU: Quad-core 1.2 GHz
- Memory: 512 MB
- Storage: 4 GB
- Display: 1.63 in (41 mm) Super AMOLED 320x320 pixels, 278 ppi
- Connectivity: Bluetooth LE
- Power: 369mAh
- Online services: Google Play, Google Now
- Dimensions: 51 x 39.9 x 7.9 mm (LxWxH)
- Weight: 75 g (2.6 oz)
- Successor: Asus ZenWatch 2

The Asus ZenWatch was an Android Wear-based smartwatch announced on September 3, 2014 at IFA and released by Asus on November 9, 2014. It used Android Wear, a modified version of Android designed specifically for smartwatches and other wearables. ASUS has also provided a custom app manager for this watch called the ZenWatch manager.

== Applications ==
For health tracking, people could use the ASUS ZenFit app as well as other health apps including Google Fit. It was compatible with all smartphones running Android 4.3 or higher that support Bluetooth LE. Android Wear features a notification system based on Google Now technology that enables it to receive spoken commands from the user.

== Reception ==
The Verge praised the design, bright display and the comfort on the wrist, but disliked the inaccurate pedometer and short battery life, and said Android Wear's interface still needed work.

== See also ==
- Alba (watch)
- ADINA Watches
