= LG Watch Urbane =

2015 smartwatch by LG Corporation

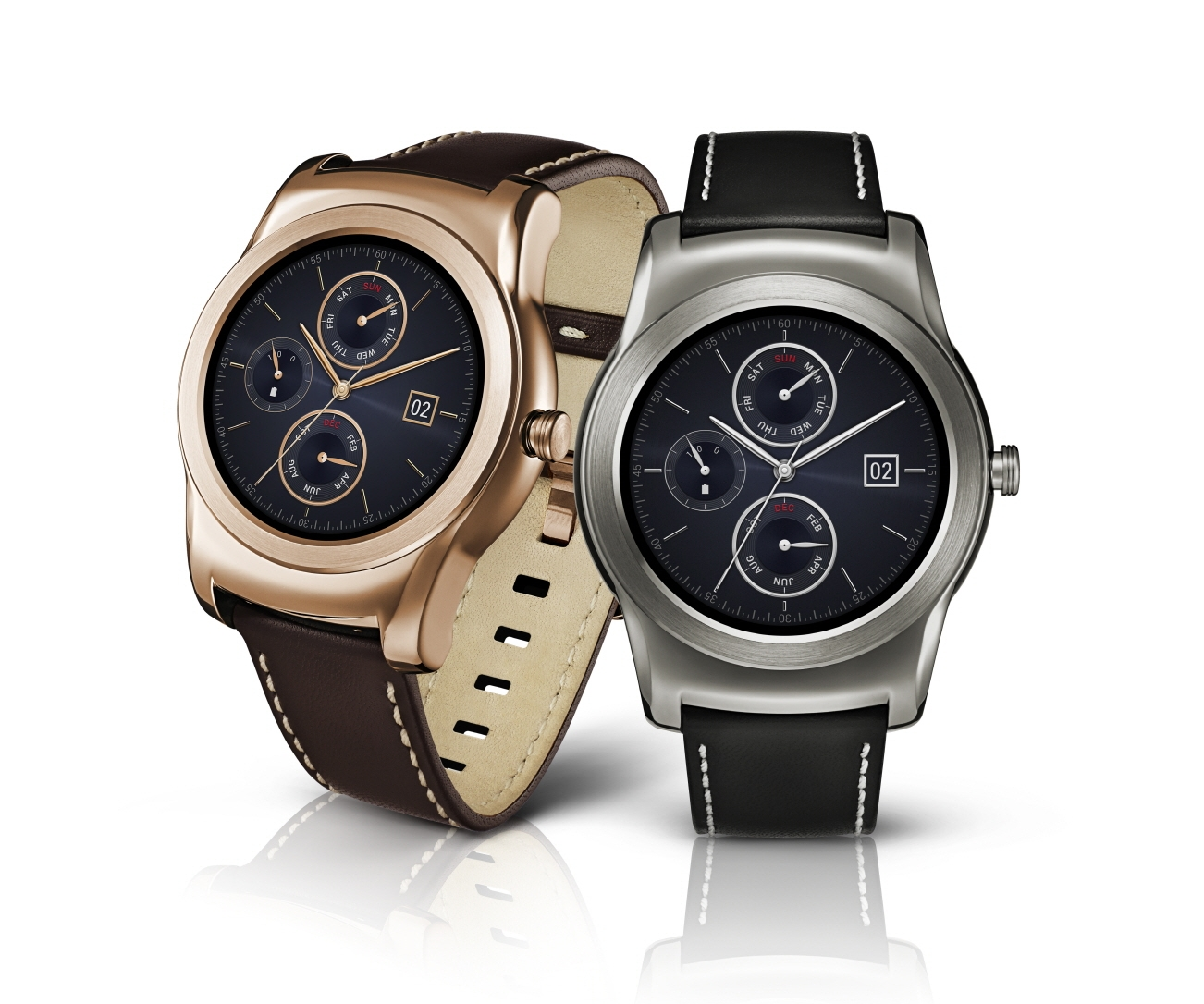
- Left to right: Rose Gold and Silver
- Also known as: W150
- Developer: LG Electronics
- Manufacturer: LG Electronics
- Type: Smartwatch
- Released: April 27, 2015
- Discontinued: May 24, 2016
- Operating system: Wear OS 2.15 (based on Android 7.1.1 Nougat)
- System on a chip: Qualcomm Snapdragon 400
- CPU: Quad-core ARM Cortex A7 @ 1.2GHz
- Memory: 512 MB (LPDDR2)
- Storage: 4 GB eMMC
- Display: 1.3-inch circular P-OLED display, 320 x 320p resolution, Corning Gorilla Glass 3
- Graphics: Adreno 305
- Input: Capacitive touch 9-axis sensor(Gyro/ Accelerometer / Compass); Barometer; PPG heart rate monitor Microphone; WiFi 802.11 b/g/n
- Connectivity: Bluetooth 4.1 LE; Wi-Fi 802.11 b/g/n
- Power: 410 mAh battery
- Online services: Google Play, Google Now
- Dimensions: 45.5 x 52.2 x 10.9 mm
- Weight: 66.5g (2.34oz)
- Predecessor: LG G Watch R
- Successor: LG Watch Style
- Website: LG W150

The LG Watch Urbane is a smartwatch released by LG Corporation on April 27, 2015. There are gold and silver models, each with a 22mm-wide interchangeable strap. The watch has IP67 dust and water resistance.

The LG Watch Urbane runs Android Wear and is equipped with a Qualcomm Snapdragon 400 SoC, 512MB of LPDDR2 RAM, and 4GB of eMMC storage. The OLED display is a POLED variant with an equivalent resolution to a square display of 320x320, and has capacitive touch input.

The watch communicates with its companion Android phone or iPhone using Bluetooth v4.1LE, and has 2.4 GHz 802.11b/g/n WiFi for synchronizing Google Services data.

The watch has nine axis movement sensors (gyro, accelerometer, compass), barometer, and a heart rate sensor. The watch has a microphone which is used with Google Assistant's speech recognition. Unlike newer Wear devices it does not have a speaker, so it can only vibrate for alerts. The watch charges through contacts on its back, which connect via sprung "pogo" pins to a magnetically clamped puck, and the puck has a microUSB connector and thus requires an external power source.

A second model, the Watch Urbane LTE, has cellular connectivity and runs WebOS instead of Android.
