= Heart rate monitor =

Personal monitoring device

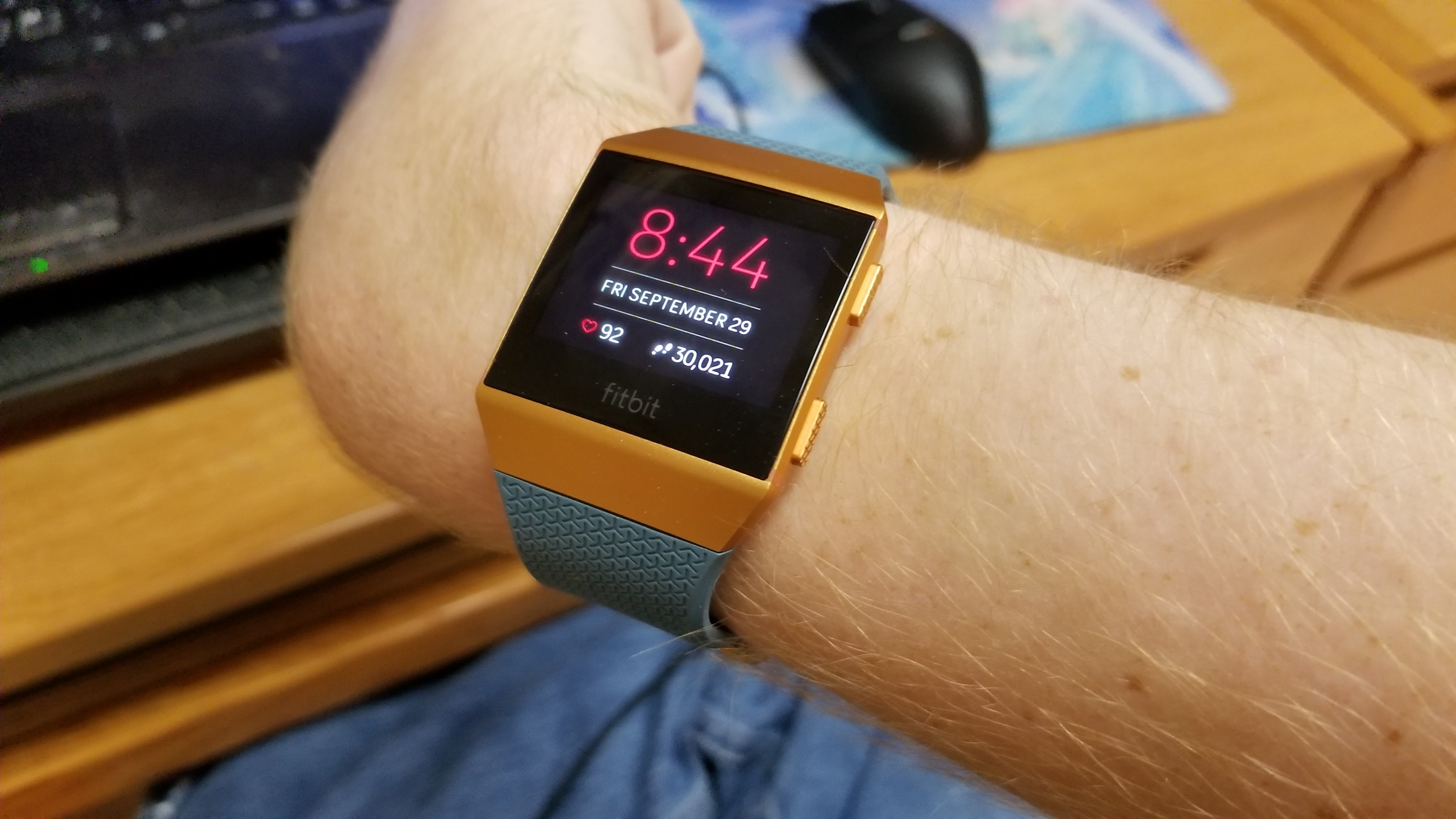
Smartwatch displaying a reading of 92 beats per minute

audio sample of heart rate monitor

A heart rate monitor (HRM) is a personal monitoring device that allows one to measure/display heart rate in real time or record the heart rate for later study. It is largely used to gather heart rate data while performing various types of physical exercise. Measuring electrical heart information is referred to as electrocardiography (ECG or EKG).

Medical heart rate monitoring used in hospitals is usually wired and usually multiple sensors are used. Portable medical units are referred to as a Holter monitor. Consumer heart rate monitors are designed for everyday use and do not use wires to connect.

== History ==
Early models consisted of a monitoring box with a set of electrode leads which attached to the chest. The first wireless EKG heart rate monitor was invented in 1977 by Polar Electro as a training aid for the Finnish National Cross Country Ski team. As "intensity training" became a popular concept in athletic circles in the mid-80s, retail sales of wireless personal heart monitors started in 1983.

== Technologies ==
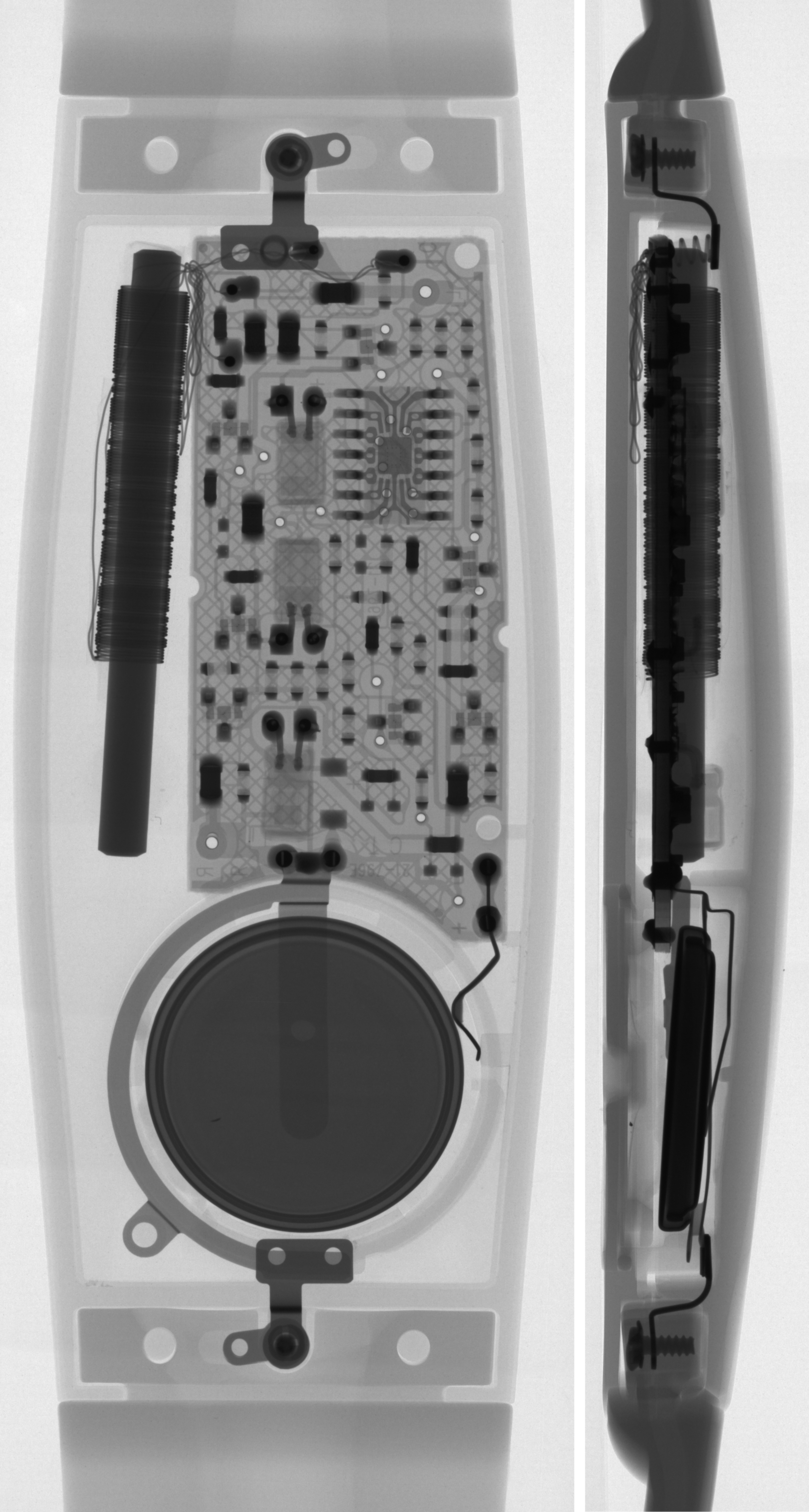
X-ray image of a chest strap (left: frontal view; right: side view). Visible is the circuit board, the antenna for data transfer, the battery and the connections to the electrodes in the adjoining belt at picture top and bottom.

Modern heart rate monitors commonly use one of two different methods to record heart signals (electrical and optical). Both types of signals can provide the same basic heart rate data, using fully automated algorithms to measure heart rate, such as the Pan-Tompkins algorithm.

ECG (Electrocardiography) sensors measure the bio-potential generated by electrical signals that control the expansion and contraction of heart chambers, typically implemented in medical devices.

PPG (Photoplethysmography) sensors use light-based technology to measure the blood volume controlled by the heart's pumping action.

=== Electrical ===
The electrical monitors consist of two elements: a monitor/transmitter, which is worn on a chest strap or upper arm band, and a receiver. When a heartbeat is detected, a radio signal is transmitted, which the receiver uses to display/determine the current heart rate. This signal can be a simple radio pulse or a unique coded signal from the chest strap (such as Bluetooth, ANT, or other low-power radio links). Newer technology prevents one user's receiver from using signals from other nearby transmitters (known as cross-talk interference) or eavesdropping. Note, that the older Polar 5.1 kHz radio transmission technology is usable underwater. Both Bluetooth and Ant+ use the 2.4 GHz radio band, which cannot send signals underwater.

=== Optical ===
Welsh Government video: a smart phone heart rate monitor, 2016

More recent devices use optics to measure heart rate by shining light from an LED through the skin and measuring how it scatters off blood vessels. In addition to measuring the heart rate, some devices using this technology are able to measure blood oxygen saturation (SpO_{2}). Some recent optical sensors can also transmit data as mentioned above.

Newer devices such as cell phones or watches can be used to display and/or collect the information. Some devices can simultaneously monitor heart rate, oxygen saturation, and other parameters. These may include sensors such as accelerometers, gyroscopes, and GPS to detect speed, location and distance. In recent years, it has been common for smartwatches to include heart rate monitors, which has greatly increased in popularity. Some smartwatches, smart bands and cell phones often use PPG sensors.

The method for measuring heart health parameters from the pulse waveform is implemented by the manufacturer of the ACCO (Accofrisk) AI watch using the PAH8011ES optical low-power heart rate monitoring chip developed by PixArt Imaging Inc.. The vendor claims that the artificial intelligence system and wearable device measure the following cardiac parameters: Fibrinogen (FIB), Coronary Perfusion Pressure (CCP), Central Venous Pressure (CVP), Myocardial Perfusion (CMBV), Cardiac Output (CO), Cardiac Output Force (CPO), Myocardial Blood Supply and Consumption Rate (CMBR), Right Ventricular Stroke Work (RVSW), Myocardial Blood Demand (CMBN), Myocardial Oxygen Consumption (HOV), Global Ejection Fraction (GEF), Coronary Heart Disease Risk Index (CHD-RI), Cardiac Function Index (CFI), Cardiac Index (CI), Left Ventricular Stroke Work Index (LVWI), and Global End-Diastolic Volume Index (GEDV).

=== Fitness metrics ===
Garmin (Venu Sq 2 and Lily*), Polar Electro (Polar H9, Polar H10, and Polar Verity Sense), Suunto, Samsung Galaxy Watch (Galaxy Watch 5 and Galaxy Watch 6*), Google (Pixel Watch 2*), Spade and Company, Vital Fitness Tracker**, Apple Watch (Series 7**, Series 9*, Apple Watch SE*, Apple Watch Ultra 2*), Mobvoi (TicWatch Pro 5*) and Fitbit (Versa 3** and Versa 4*) are vendors selling consumer heart rate products. Most companies use their own proprietary heart rate algorithms.

== Accuracy ==
The newer, wrist based heart rate monitors have achieved almost identical levels of accuracy as their chest strap counterparts with independent tests showing up to 95% accuracy, but sometimes more than 30% error can persist for several minutes. Optical devices can be less accurate when used during vigorous activity, or when used underwater.

Currently, heart rate variability is less available on optical devices. Apple introduced HRV data collection to the Apple Watch devices in 2018. Fitbit started offering HRV monitoring on their devices starting from the Fitbit Sense, released in 2020.

=== Heart rate prediction ===
Heart rate prediction using machine learning has gained significant attention in health monitoring and sports performance research. Namazi et.al., 2025 evaluated various models including Long Short-Term Memory (LSTM), Physics-Informed Neural Networks (PINNs), and 1D Convolutional Neural Networks (1D CNNs), using physiological data such as heart rate (HR), breathing rate (BR), and RR intervals collected from wearable sensors during sports activities. The study introduced a hybrid approach combining Singular Spectrum Analysis (SSA) with these models to enhance predictive performance. Among the tested models, the SSA-LSTM method yielded the lowest prediction error, particularly when multivariate inputs (HR + BR + RR) were used. These findings support the use of AI-driven, multivariate prediction models for real-time cardiovascular monitoring in athletic and healthcare settings.

== See also ==
- Activity tracker
- Apple Watch
- E-textiles
- eHealth
- GPS watch
- Pedometer
