= Audacy =

American internet radio platform

- Type: Subsidiary
- Branding: Internet radio Music recommender system
- Country: United States
- Availability: Nationwide
- Headquarters: Philadelphia, Pennsylvania, U.S.
- Owner: Audacy, Inc.
- Launch date: July 2010; 16 years ago
- Former names: Radio.com (2010–2021)
- Affiliations: Audacy, Inc.; Bonneville International; Connoisseur Media; Townsquare Media; Mid-West Family Broadcasting; Cox Media Group; Cumulus Media; Salem Media Group; Beasley Media Group; iHeartMedia; Spanish Broadcasting System; Urban One; WVRC Media
- Official website: www.audacy.com

Audacy, previously known as Radio.com, is an American free broadcast and Internet radio platform developed by its parent company Audacy, Inc. (formerly known as Entercom). The Audacy platform functions as a music recommender system and is the national umbrella brand for the company's radio network aggregating its over 235 local radio stations across the United States. In addition, the service includes thousands of podcasts created for the platform, hosted elsewhere or station programming on demand. It was initially developed by CBS Radio and was acquired by the former Entercom as part of the company's takeover of CBS Radio. The service's main competitors are rival station groups iHeartMedia's iHeartRadio and TuneIn. Audacy is available online via mobile devices and devices such as Chromecast and Amazon Fire TV.

== History ==
Radio.com logo used 2017-2018

The radio.com domain was formerly owned by CNET Networks, which purchased it, and tv.com from the nonprofit Internet Multicasting Service for $30,000 in 1996. CNET, and in turn the radio.com domain, was acquired by CBS Corporation (the parent company of CBS Radio at the time) in 2008.

Radio.com launched on July 16, 2010, under CBS Radio. It was originally launched as a central website to stream all of CBS's then 130 radio stations, Last.fm and other CBS properties. The original features were currently-playing information, song history, station and genre search, presets, blogs, newsfeeds, and social media tools. Later that year the service launched its first app for iOS. In addition the service added custom channels and music from AOL Radio and Yahoo Music. In 2015, the service added a music video streaming option. These deals eventually ended quietly, especially after AOL and Yahoo's mergers into Oath.

Entercom acquired CBS Radio, including Radio.com, on November 17, 2017.

Throughout early and mid-2018, disparate individual mobile apps and sites for Entercom's legacy stations (sometimes developed outside Entercom by local third parties for individual stations and often not being hosted universally by one provider) were withdrawn from the iTunes Store and Google Play, uniting all of Entercom's web and mobile efforts for their properties solely under the Radio.com app and website. The CBS Radio stations, which were part of "CBS Local" sites with their former sister television stations, also saw their main web presences moved to sub-domains of Radio.com. Some of the former CBS Local domains in markets where CBS only had radio stations remained online until late 2021 despite no longer hosting local radio content, instead carrying content from the nearest CBS-owned television station.

Final logo as Radio.com

On June 25, 2018, Entercom announced that Radio.com would become the exclusive streaming provider for all of its stations, ending its relationship with the third-party service TuneIn. Stations previously owned by Entercom pre-merger were removed on July 6, and former CBS Radio stations were removed on August 1. At that time, Entercom's stations would also begin promoting the service, in particular, suffixing "a Radio.com station" after their legal station identifications at the top of each hour. Smart speaker integration of the service was launched within the same period.

In October 2019, the app debuted a feature called "Rewind", where several of Entercom's spoken word content stations maintain a 24-hour on-demand buffer of programming that can be accessed through rewind, fast-forward, and skip back/forward controls.

On March 30, 2021, Entercom rebranded the company and Radio.com as Audacy. The end tag of Audacy's station identifications was then changed to identify them as "an Audacy station", along with a seven-note sounder whose tone varies with a station's format (such as a guitar playing it for a rock station, or a softer sound for a 'Mix'-like station). The end tag for all Audacy's stations was changed once again in July 2022 to "Always live on the free Audacy app." Audacy, Inc. put the Radio.com domain up for auction on December 29, 2022, with a minimum required bid of $2.5 million (USD); by June 1, 2023, the auction had closed without a winner. As of March 2025, Audacy has sold its Radio.com domain & the website is operational as of December 2025.

On July 19, 2022, Audacy announced a redesign of their player on their website and their app to include enhanced features such as "Enhanced Rewind" allowing listeners to rewind spoken-word programming, curated discovery of content, seamless cross-device functionality, and enriched podcast listening.

In early January 2024, it was announced that Audacy would be preparing to file for bankruptcy within the upcoming weeks. On January 7, 2024, Audacy filed for Chapter 11 bankruptcy protection. As part of the bankruptcy reorganization, Audacy has made a deal with its creditors to transfer control to them while cutting approximately $1.6 billion of its debt.

Investment firm Soros Fund Management has emerged as the largest creditor in Audacy's prepackaged Chapter 11 bankruptcy proceedings, holding over $400 million of its highest-ranking debt. This debt is planned to be converted into equity in the restructured company, making Soros a significant shareholder.

This investment aligns with Soros' recent media interests, including involvement in the acquisitions of Vice Media and a minority stake in Crooked Media. Under its proposed plan, existing shareholders will be wiped out, while high-ranking creditors will receive equity in the reorganized company. The plan requires court approval.

=== Content partnerships ===
Since 2019, the company under its previous Radio.com branding made several content partnerships to bring audio simulcasts of cable news channels as well as popular radio networks. With the exception of CBS News and additional local radio stations from companies outside Audacy's footprint, most of these national content deals have ended around 2024.

On February 7, 2019, Entercom launched stations for CNN, CNN International, HLN, Bloomberg Radio and Bloomberg Television on Radio.com along with podcasts from Turner Podcast Network via deals with Bloomberg L.P. and Turner Broadcasting. Two weeks later, Radio.com reached deals to add Bonneville International and Cox Media Group stations and podcasts to the platform.

On September 25, 2019, Salem Media Group and Alpha Media stations were made available on the service. Beasley Broadcast Group stations joined the service on November 11, 2020.

On November 25, 2019, Disney Channels Worldwide agreed to terms to feature Radio Disney and Radio Disney Country's streams on the service; they were removed in January 2021 as Disney wound down their American radio operations, excluding ESPN Radio. Disney-branded music stations returned to the Audacy app in a new deal in August 2022.

On August 17, 2021, Audacy announced a content distribution partnership with Urban One to add its stations to Audacy. On September 15, 2021, Audacy announced that Cumulus Media-owned radio stations and podcasts would be added.

On May 23, 2023, Audacy signed a deal with Allen Media Group's The Weather Channel to carry the audio of the cable network, along with the streams of the Pattrn and Weather Channel en Español FAST channels.

After a five-year absence, Audacy's stations returned to TuneIn at the end of June 2023 as part of a new content partnership with the latter.

== Availability and supported devices ==
In addition to traditional desktop availability, the service is available via iOS/WatchOS and Android mobile and tablet devices, along with Amazon Alexa and Google Assistant-compatible smart speakers and other devices. An app on Roku was discontinued in July 2025.

Streaming of Audacy content is Geo-restricted to the United States. In addition, local advertising from the advertisers of the nearest Audacy cluster of stations to a listener is substituted over a station's advertising, along with traditional national advertising, public service announcements and Audacy features such as music news, trivia, and other minutia. Professional sports play-by-play are also geo-restricted to within the station's broadcast area, with either alternate/regular programming or a disclaimer airing instead online outside its market area.

== See also ==
- Channel Q, an LGBTQ radio network
- iHeartRadio – main competitor
- TuneIn
