= Google Nest (smart speakers) =

Line of voice-enabled smart speakers and displays by Google

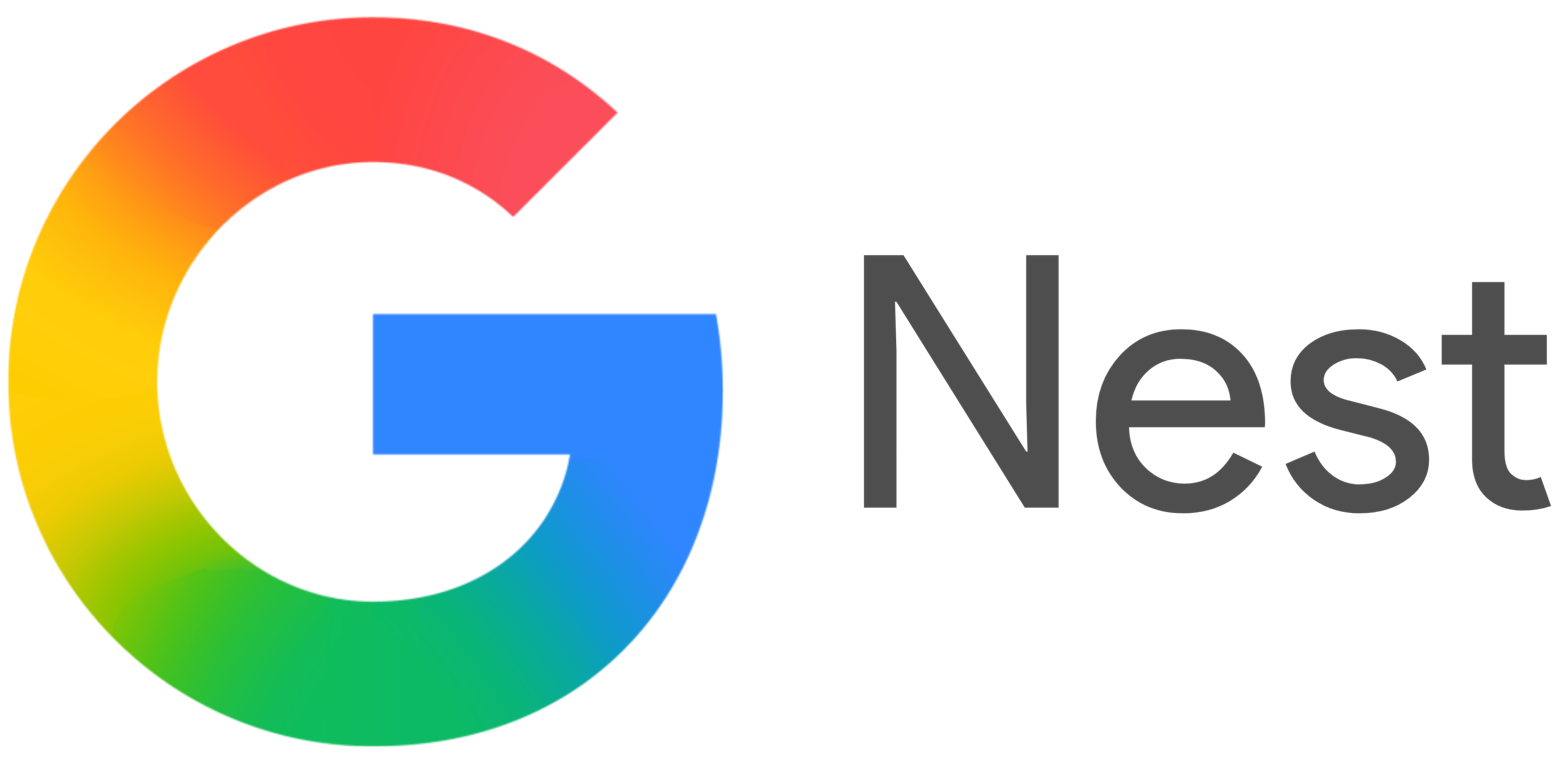

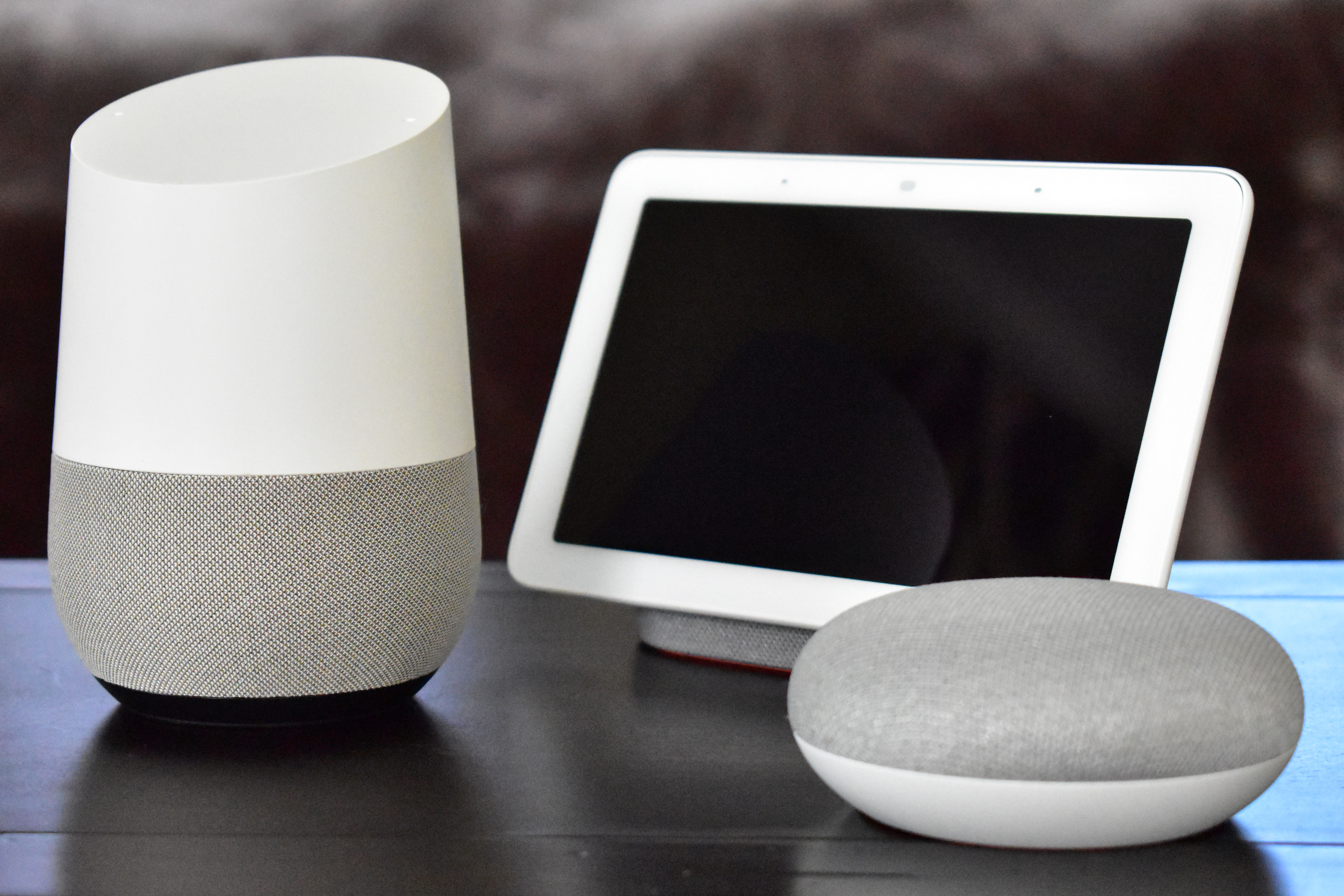
- Several products released under the Google Home name: Google Home, Google Home Hub, and Google Home Mini
- Developer: Google
- Type: Smart speaker
- Released: November 4, 2016; 9 years ago
- Units sold: 52 million
- Input: Voice commands, limited physical touch surface
- Connectivity: Wi-Fi dual-band (2.4/5 GHz) 802.11b/g/n/ac, Bluetooth
- Website: home.google.com

Google Nest, formerly known as Google Home, is a line of smart speakers developed by Google under the Google Nest brand. The devices enable users to speak voice commands to interact with services through Google Assistant, the company's virtual assistant, and with a touchscreen display on some models. Both in-house and third-party services are integrated, allowing users to listen to music, control playback of videos or photos, or receive news updates entirely by voice. Google Nest devices also have integrated support for home automation, letting users control smart home appliances with their voice command. The first device, Google Home, was released in the United States in November 2016; subsequent product releases have occurred globally since 2017.

Through software updates to Google Nest devices and Google Assistant, additional functionality has been added over time. For example, multiple speakers can be set up for synchronized playback of music. An update in April 2017 brought multi-user support, allowing the device to distinguish between up to six people by voice. In May 2017, Google announced multiple updates, including: hands-free phone calling at no cost in Canada and the United States; proactive reminders ahead of scheduled events; visual responses on mobile devices or Chromecast-enabled televisions; Bluetooth audio streaming; and the ability to add reminders and calendar appointments.

The original Google Home speaker released in November 2016 featured a cylindrical shape with colored status LEDs on top. In October 2017, Google announced two additions to the product lineup, the miniature puck-shaped Google Home Mini and a larger Google Home Max. In October 2018, the company released the Google Home Hub, a smart speaker with a 7-inch touchscreen. In May 2019, Google announced that Google Home devices would be rebranded under the Google Nest banner, and it unveiled the Nest Hub Max, a larger smart display.

== History ==
In March 2016, reports were published about Google developing a wireless speaker to compete against the Amazon Echo. Google Home was officially announced at the company's developer conference in May 2016, where it was also announced that Home would run the Google Assistant (a conversational evolution of Google Now intended to be integrated in other products announced at the conference as well).

In October 2016, the iOS and Android mobile app used to initially set up Google Home and Google's other streaming devices was renamed from "Google Cast" to "Google Home", leaving Google Cast as the name solely of the protocol that "sends" audio/video content to play back on another device. The Google Home smart speaker was released in the US on November 4, 2016, and in the UK on April 6, 2017. In May 2017, Google announced that Home would be heading to Australia, Canada, France, Germany, and Japan in middle 2017, and the device subsequently became available for pre-order in Canada on June 2, 2017, with a retail date of June 26. In July 2017, Google announced the release of Google Home in Australia on July 20, 2017, France on August 3, 2017, Germany on August 8, 2017, and Italy on March 27, 2018.

On October 4, 2017, Google announced Google Home Mini, a smaller, less expensive variant that was released on October 19, 2017, as well as Google Home Max, a larger, more expensive variant that was released on December 11, 2017.

The Google Home and Home Mini were released in India on April 10, 2018, and the Nest Hub was released on August 26, 2019.

As of May 8, 2018, the Google Home was planned for release in Denmark, South Korea, Mexico, the Netherlands, Norway, Spain, and Sweden.

On May 7, 2019, during the Google I/O keynote, Google announced that all of their smart home products will henceforth be marketed under the Nest brand. Nest had been subsumed by Google's home hardware unit in July 2018.

On July 10, 2019, a report published by Belgian broadcaster VRT NWS managed to gain access to more than a thousand audio excerpts recorded by Google Assistant in Belgium and the Netherlands. The audio files were sent to Google employees to develop Google Assistant's speech technology. According to the VRT NWS report, 153 of the 1,000 audio files should have never been recorded and during which the command "OK Google" was clearly not given. In some cases, the recordings included "bedroom conversations, conversations between parents and their children, but also blazing rows and professional phone calls containing lots of private information".

Google defended the practice in a blog post: "As part of our work to develop speech technology for more languages, we partner with language experts around the world who understand the nuances and accents of a specific language," Google wrote. "These language experts review and transcribe a small set of queries to help us better understand those languages. This is a critical part of the process of building speech technology and is necessary to creating products like the Google Assistant."

== Models ==
=== Google Home ===
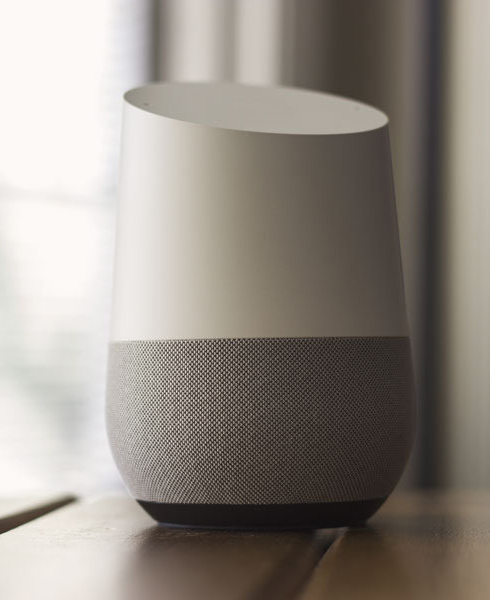
The original Google Home

The original Google Home model is a cylindrical speaker that is 5.62 inches (143 millimetres) tall and 3.79 inches (96 millimetres) in diameter. The top surface of the device features colored status LEDs, and features capacitive touch controls to start and stop music, and adjust volume. A mute button is located on the back of the device, which disables the microphones.

The base of the device is covered by a shell acting as a speaker grille, which is designed to be removed and replaced with one that suits the decor of a room. As of November 2016, Google offers fabric shells in "Mango", "Marine", and "Violet" color finishes, and metallic shells in "Carbon", "Copper", and "Snow" finishes.

The Information reported that Google Home's internal hardware was very similar to that of the Chromecast, with the same ARM processor and Wi-Fi chip. In November 2016, a teardown of the original model by iFixit confirmed that the device featured many of the same hardware components as the second-generation Chromecast.

=== Home Mini ===
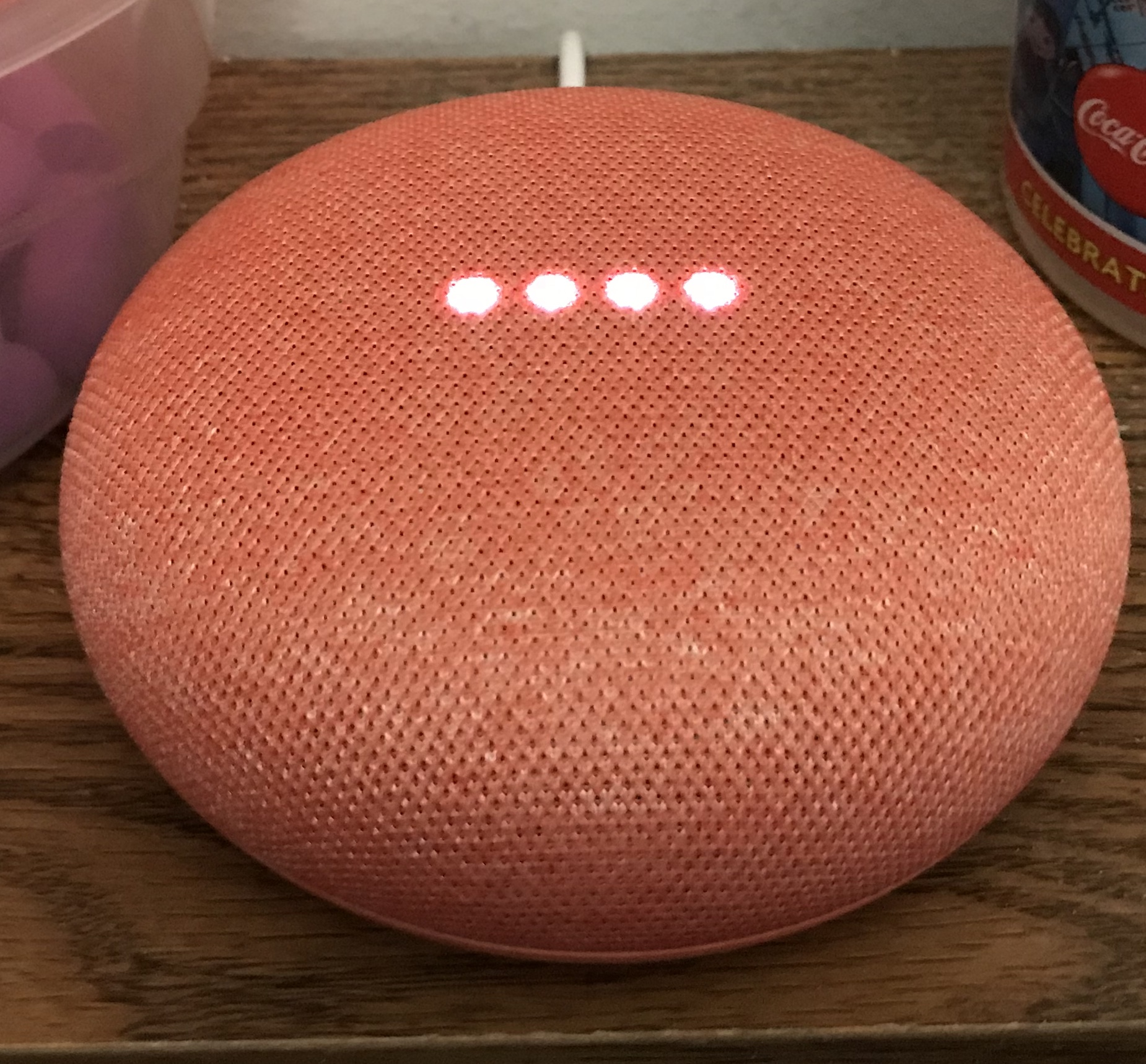
A coral-colored Home Mini, listening

Google unveiled the Google Home Mini during a hardware-focused event on October 4, 2017, which was released on October 19, 2017. It is a variant of Google Home with the same overall functionality, but in a smaller pebble-like form factor around 4 inches (10 cm) in diameter, with a fabric top that its white-colored status lights shine through. It has a mute switch rather than a mute button, and uses a micro USB connection for power. It is available in the colors "aqua", "chalk", "charcoal", and "coral". Analysts compared the Google Home Mini to Amazon's equivalent Echo Dot model.

Prior to its release, a "phantom input" bug was discovered, where its touch-sensitive surface—which could be tapped to activate Assistant without using a hotword command—inadvertently activated on its own, resulting in unwanted voice recording. Due to privacy concerns, Google removed the feature entirely from all units via a software update. In December 2017, Google released an update to Home Mini, allowing users to long-press the volume buttons to play and pause audio.

=== Home Max ===
During its October 4, 2017, event, Google unveiled the Google Home Max, which was released on December 11, 2017. It is a larger version of the Google Home device with stereo speakers (including two tweeters and subwoofers), an audio connector (input), and a USB Type-C connector intended for a wired Ethernet adapter. It was released in the colors "chalk" and "charcoal", and has a magnetically attached stand for vertical orientation, and "Smart Sound", an adaptive audio system that uses machine learning to automatically adjust sound output based on factors such as the environment (including placement and sources of noise) and time of day. Reviewers compared the Home Max to Sonos smart speakers and Apple's HomePod. The Google Home Max was discontinued from sale on December 14, 2020.

=== Home Hub / Nest Hub ===
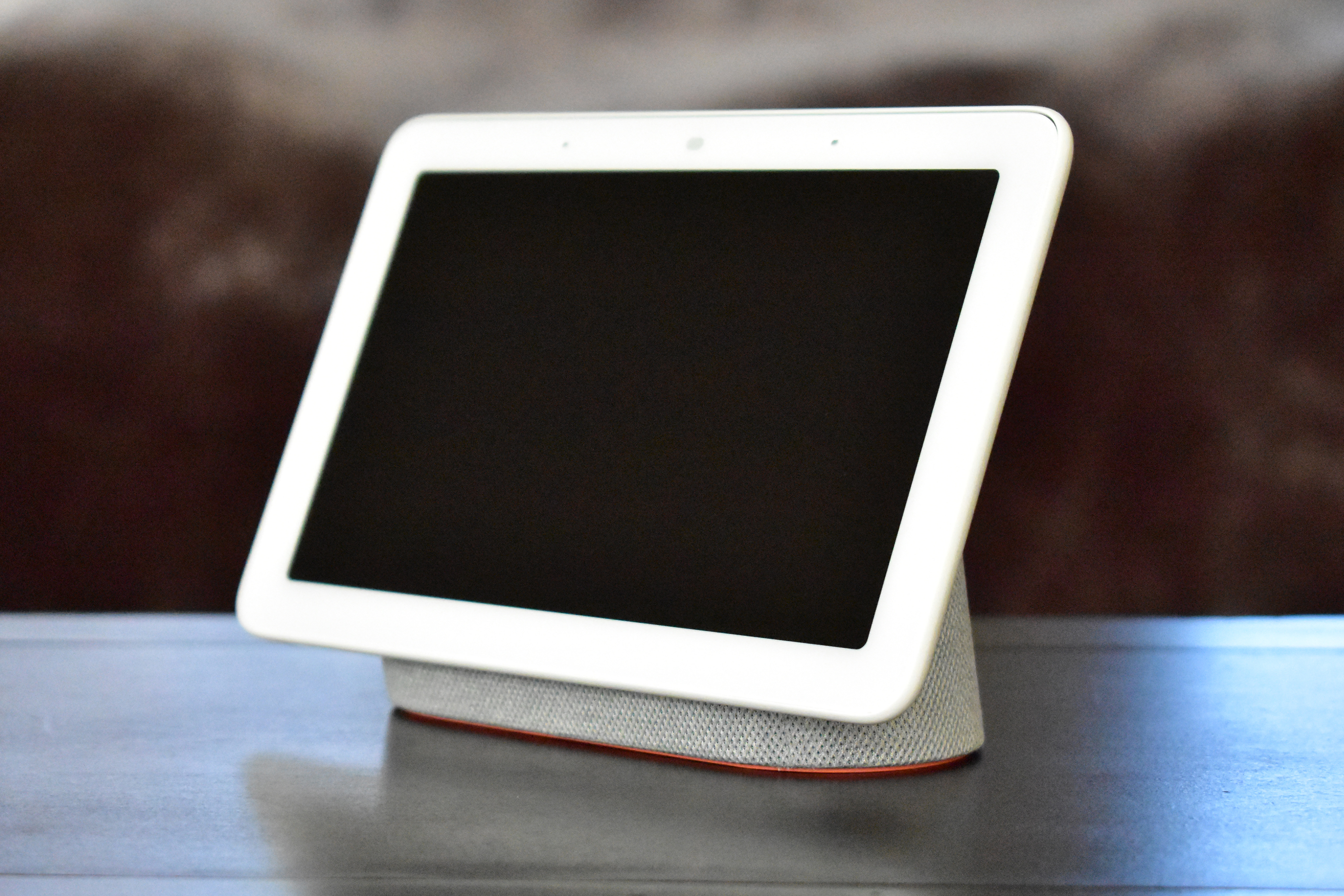
The Google Home Hub smart display, now named the Nest Hub

On October 9, 2018, Google unveiled the Google Home Hub, which features a 7-inch (1024 x 600) touchscreen display that can be used to provide visual feedback for queries. The "Home View" feature provides a centralized, visual interface for controlling supported smart home devices and Nest video cameras (other vendors such as Wyze and Arlo can also be streamed). Unlike its closest competitor, the Amazon Echo Show, the Home Hub does not include a camera for video calls, citing customer privacy concerns. Although Google has developed an OEM solution for Assistant-powered smart display devices based on Android Things and a Qualcomm system-on-chip, the Home Hub utilizes a different hardware platform. The device is available in light gray, dark gray, pink, and aqua blue. A reported security issue in the Home Hub was dismissed by Google as a non-issue, as an attack would require access to the same Wi-Fi network as the device.

On May 7, 2019, the Google Home Hub was rebranded and renamed to the Google Nest Hub.

On May 25, 2021, an update for the Preview Program released to the first generation model replaced the Linux-based Cast OS with Google Fuchsia, becoming the first commercial device to ever feature the operating system.

==== Second generation ====
On March 30, 2021, a second generation of the Google Nest Hub was released. The second generation sported 50% more bass and a sleep sensor. The Nest Hub kept its 7-inch touchscreen.

=== Nest Hub Max ===
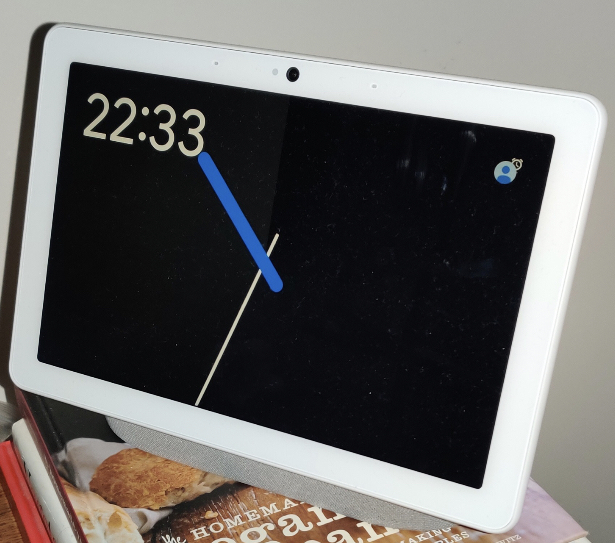
Nest Hub Max with a camera, displaying a clock screensaver

A larger version of the Google Nest Hub, called the Google Nest Hub Max, was announced on May 7, 2019. It features a 10-inch (1280 x 800) display, integrated camera (which can be used for face recognition, Google Duo video calls, and as a security camera), and larger speakers with a rear-facing subwoofer. It was released in September 2019.

=== Nest Mini ===
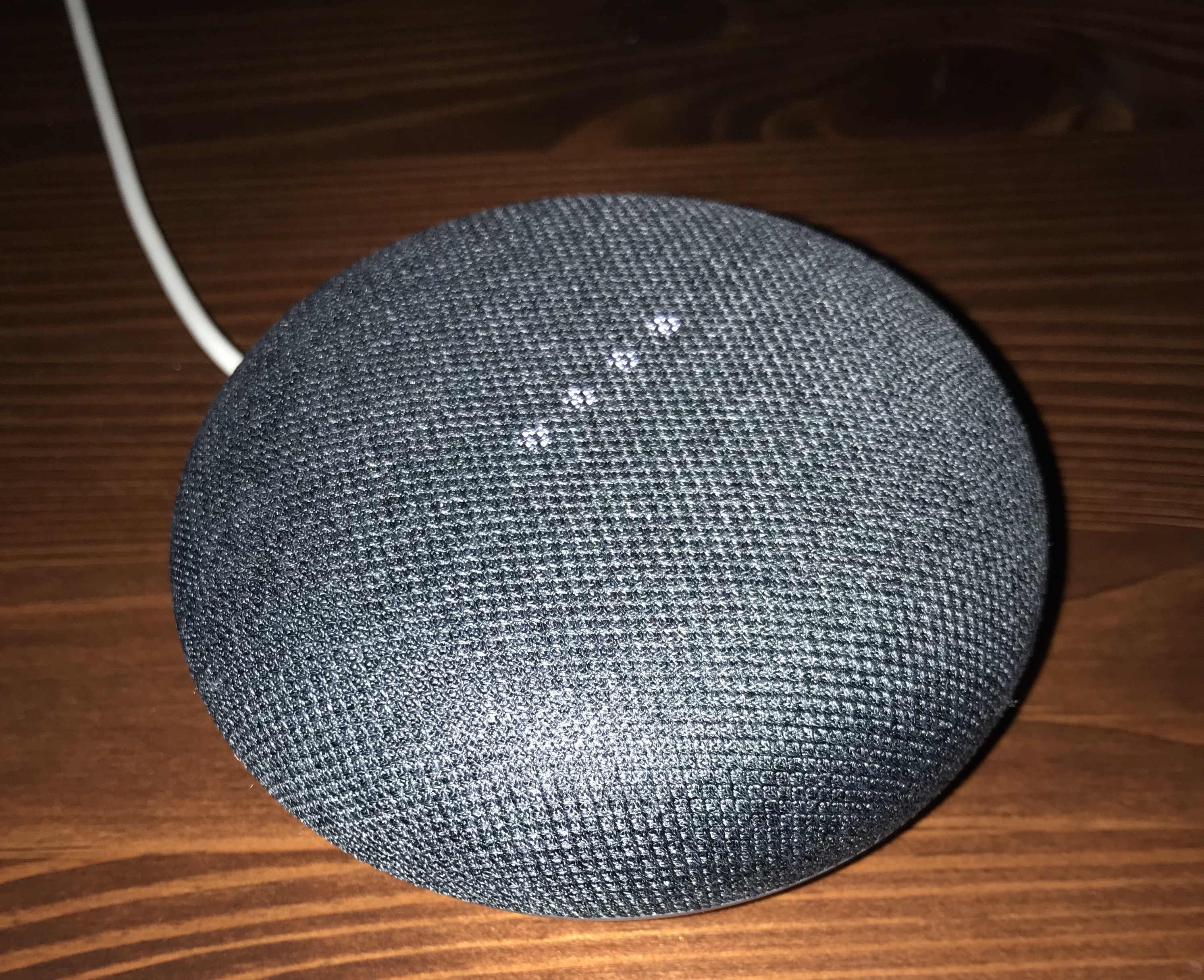
A charcoal-colored Nest Mini (2nd gen.)

On October 15, 2019, Google unveiled a second-generation model of the Home Mini branded as the Google Nest Mini. It was released on October 22. The device is similar in design to the first-generation Home Mini with several small improvements. The fabric of the Nest Mini is made of recycled consumer plastic bottles. The device is powered by a proprietary pin-style DC plug with higher energy input and reliability than the previous iteration's Micro-USB. The upgrades include a larger speaker, an additional microphone, a machine learning chip that can cache voice recognition data for commonly used commands locally. It contains LED lights that highlight the touch areas for volume control and makes use of "ultrasound sensing", allowing for findability in dark environments. The bottom of the Nest Mini contains a hole for wall-mounting with a screw. It is available in the colors "chalk", "charcoal", "coral", and "sky blue".

=== Nest Audio ===
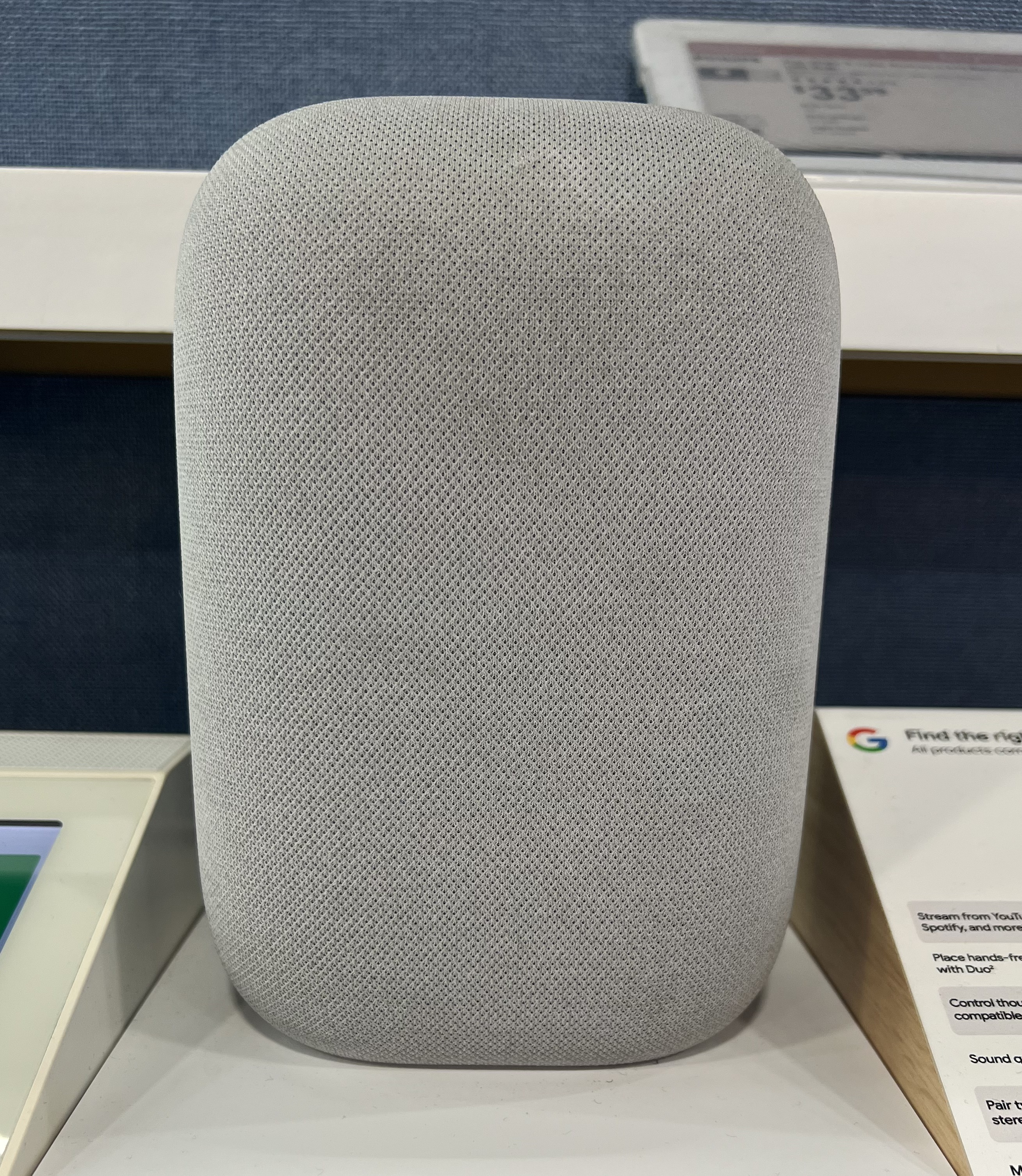
A chalk-colored Nest Audio

On September 30, 2020, Google released the Google Nest Audio, which acts as the successor to the original Google Home and incorporates some design elements of the Home Max.

In June 2026, Google ended production of both the Nest Mini and Nest Audio, while stating that existing devices would continue to receive software and security updates.

=== Home Speaker ===
On October 1, 2025, Google returned to the Google Home name for their smart speakers with the announcement of the Google Home Speaker. These models will now allow pairing with supported Google TV devices such as the Google TV Streamer for surround audio, and is the first speaker to be explicitly designed to be used with Gemini for Home. It was launched on June 25, 2026.

=== Model comparison ===
| Model | Google Home | Home Mini (1st gen) | Home Max | Home Hub / Nest Hub | Nest Hub Max | Nest Mini (2nd gen) | Nest Audio | Nest Hub (2nd generation) | Home Speaker |
|---|---|---|---|---|---|---|---|---|---|
| Release date | November 4, 2016 | October 19, 2017 | December 11, 2017 | October 22, 2018 | September 9, 2019 | October 22, 2019 | September 30, 2020 | March 30, 2021 | June 25, 2026 |
| Launch price | US$129 | $49 | $399 | $149 | $229 | $49 | $99.99 | $99 | $99 |
| Processor | Marvell 88DE3006 Armada 1500 Mini Plus 1.2 GHz dual-core ARM Cortex-A7 | Marvell 88DE3006 Armada 1500 Mini Plus 1.2 GHz dual-core ARM Cortex-A7 | Amlogic A113G 1.5 GHz quad-core ARM Cortex-A53 | Amlogic S905D2 1.5 GHz quad-core ARM Cortex-A53 | Amlogic T931 based on hexa-core Amlogic S922 with added NPU | Synaptics AS-370 1.4 GHz quad-core ARM Cortex-A53 | Synaptics AS-370 A1 1.8 GHz quad-core ARM Cortex-A53 | Amlogic S905D3 1.9 GHz quad-core ARM Cortex-A55; High-performance ML hardware engine | Quad Core A55 2.0 GHz with NPU |
| Display | —N/a | —N/a | —N/a | 7-inch, 1,024×600 pixel touchscreen | 10-inch, 1,280×800 pixel touchscreen | —N/a | —N/a | 7-inch, 1,024×600 pixel touchscreen | —N/a |
| Built-in camera | —N/a | —N/a | —N/a | —N/a | 6.5 megapixel camera | —N/a | —N/a | —N/a | —N/a |
| Bluetooth version supported | Bluetooth 4.1 | Bluetooth 4.1 | Bluetooth 4.2 | Bluetooth 5.0 | Bluetooth 5.0 | Bluetooth 5.0 | Bluetooth 5.0 | Bluetooth 5.0 | Bluetooth 5.4 |
| Dimensions | 3.79 in (96 mm) diameter, 5.62 in (143 mm) high | 3.86 in (98 mm) diameter, 1.65 in (42 mm) high | 13.2 in (340 mm) wide, 7.4 in (190 mm) high, 6.0 in (150 mm) deep | 2.65 in (67 mm) deep, 7.02 in (178 mm) wide, 4.65 in (118 mm) high | 3.99 in (101 mm) deep, 9.85 in (250 mm) wide, 7.19 in (183 mm) high | 3.85 in (98 mm) diameter, 1.65 in (42 mm) high | 6.89 in (175 mm) high, 4.89 in (124 mm) wide, 3.07 in (78 mm) deep | 2.7 in (69 mm) deep, 7.00 in (178 mm) wide, 4.7 in (120 mm) high | 4.2 in (107 mm) diameter, 3.4 in (86 mm) high |
| Weight | 477 g (1.05 lb) | 173 g (0.38 lb) | 5.3 kg (11.68 lb) | 480 g (1.06 lb) | 1.32 kg (2.91 lb) | 181 g (0.40 lb) | 1.2 kg (2.65 lb) | 558 g (1.23 lb) | 408 g (0.9 lb) |
| Matter support | Yes | Yes | —N/a | Yes | Yes | Yes | Yes | Yes | Yes |
| Thread support | No | No | No | No | Yes | No | No | Yes | Yes |

== Features ==
Google Assistant, an intelligent personal assistant, is included as the main and only assistant in Google Home. Unlike its predecessor, Google Now, Assistant is able to engage in two-way conversations with users. The Wall Street Journal reported in October 2016 that Google hired writers from Pixar movies and The Onion satirical newspaper to develop a personality for the Assistant, with a long-term goal being to invoke a sense of emotional rapport in users.

Various forms of both in-house and third-party services are integrated into Google Home, allowing users to speak voice commands to control interaction with them. Examples of supported services include Google Play Music, Spotify and iHeartRadio for audio, Netflix, YouTube and Google Photos for videos and photos, Google Calendar and Google Keep for tasks, and CNN, CNBC, BBC and The Wall Street Journal for news updates. New services are integrated on an ongoing basis.

Users are able to connect and group together multiple speakers connected to or as part of Google Home for synchronized playback of music in every room. A notable feature omission, multiple accounts, was criticized by JR Raphael of Computerworld in November 2016, but an update for users in the United States in April 2017 enabled the feature. Google Home can recognize up to six different voices, pulling information from their different accounts depending on who's talking. Google Home has integration with each user's calendar, for adding reminders or appointments verbally.

Google Home includes home automation features, enabling owners to use it as a central hub to control smart devices. Examples of supported devices include the Chromecast digital media player, and products from Nest, SmartThings, Philips Hue, LIFX, LightwaveRF, and Logitech Harmony.

In May 2017, Google announced multiple updates to Google Home's functionality. Google's speakers could now support hands-free calling, letting users make calls to any landline or mobile phone in the United States, Canada and later, the UK for free using a virtual number generated by google integrated into the device. In December 2021 an update to Google's Terms of Service restricted the feature of calling through Google Nest speakers to only numbers that are on the user's contacts. Google Voice users can set Google Home with voice number to make personal and business calls. There is no 9-1-1 emergency services support, however, Google Home users who live in the United States can subscribe to "Nest Aware". "Nest Aware" allows users to contact emergency call center located close to the residents home. This security feature works when users are inside of the home and when you are away on vacation. "Proactive Assistance" enables the device to dictate updates to users without being asked, including updates on traffic before a scheduled event. "Visual Responses" let users send answers from Google Home onto their mobile device or Chromecast-enabled television. The device now also supports Bluetooth audio streaming through compatible devices (including phones, tablets and computers), and the ability to schedule calendar appointments, with upcoming support for reminders.

On March 28, 2018, Google made the announcement via their blog that users would be able to pair any of their Google Home devices to their own Bluetooth speakers without requiring the use of a Chromecast streamer.

On November 5, 2018, Google announced their partnership with Disney to bring interactive read-along books to Google Home. In 2019, Apple, Google, Amazon, and Zigbee Alliance announced a partnership to make smart home products work together.

== Data storing and security methods ==
To use Google Assistant, a user of any Nest or Google Home device must register and sync an account using the Google Home mobile app. In the app, a setting allows the user to teach Google Assistant their voice. The Google voice technology can be used in digital forensics, where the words "OK, Google" are capable of unlocking mobile locks. A mobile device can be found, unlocked, and data can be extracted through the use of a suspect's voice file. "Hey Google" can also be used to wake up the device. Some features of Nest devices require the voice to be verified as to determine if the user is the owner. The device can also tell if it is connected to other smart devices, which can find stored data.

== Reception ==
=== Original Google Home speaker ===
The original Google Home received favorable reviews. The Google Home's design and sound input/output received significant praise, while a lack of interoperability between other Google Assistant-enabled devices was criticized. Critics also expressed concerns about Google's intentions with the device, particularly whether or not features would be more tightly integrated into other Google products.

David Pierce of Wired compared Google Home to Amazon Echo, writing in a summary that "Sometimes Home feels like sci-fi magic. Sometimes it reaches beyond its grasp and falls flat. The Echo is less impressive, but more reliable". Pierce praised the look of Google Home, writing that it feels "minimalist, thoughtful, and warm" in the environment, and also praised its speaker, describing it as "richer, brighter and more dynamic than the Echo, and loud enough to fill a room". While noting that Home's use of the Google Assistant functioned in different ways than it does through the Allo app or Pixel smartphone, meaning quick instructions rather than longer tasks, he praised its search abilities, writing that "you’d expect Home to excel at search. It does", despite some wrong search hiccups. Pierce criticized its lack of interoperability with other Google Assistant-enabled devices, though he called its future potential for connecting information across Google's product lines "enormous".

Ron Amadeo of Ars Technica praised Google Home's setup process and its ability to pick up voice commands even from a distance, calling the latter "absolutely incredible". He noted the device's limiting of its Bluetooth capabilities at the time (before the May 2017 update), however, writing that "it's important to know that Google Home is not a Bluetooth speaker; it's purely a Google Cast device. If you want to play audio on a Google Home, the service needs to have a Google Cast button". He similarly criticized the Assistant's lack of cross-device functionality, writing that "Pretty much all the actions you send to a Google Home will stay on that Google Home, and there's never an interaction with your phone", and he noted concerns and questions regarding whether Google has an intention to incorporate the functionality deeper into its product lines. Additionally, in his summary, he wrote that "Why pay $129 for a device that is less capable than an Android phone?".

== See also ==
- IFTTT
- Invoke
