= Weave (protocol) =

Network application layer protocol

- Developed by: Google Nest
- Introduced: 2013; 13 years ago
- Industry: Home automation
- Superseded by: Matter (standard)
- Website: openweave.io

Weave is a network application layer protocol and, in implementation, a comprehensive toolkit for building connected Internet of things-class applications, with a primary and current focus on consumer and residential applications.

Weave works across multiple IPv6-bearing link technologies such as Ethernet, Wi-Fi, cellular, and Thread and has adaptations for Bluetooth Low Energy point-to-point wireless links.

On December 19, 2019, Google stated that it had "joined Amazon, Apple, and the Zigbee Alliance to form the Connected Home over IP working group... Google is contributing Weave as part of this effort." Due to this, Google has stopped development on Weave, replacing it with the new Matter (standard).

== History ==
Weave was originally created by Nest Labs and launched in and with its Nest Protect (1st Generation) product in 2013. It has since been adopted and continued by Google following the Google acquisition of Nest Labs in 2014. A second wave of architectural revisions were made to Weave to support the Nest Secure security system, the Nest Connect, and the Nest x Yale Lock. Since its acquisition of Nest Labs, Google has planned to integrate Weave with its own Android Things embedded operating system (codenamed Brillo) in order to create an end-to-end solution for IoT devices.

== OpenWeave ==
OpenWeave
- Developer: Google
- Release: June 28, 2017; 9 years ago
- Stable release: 4.1.0 / January 10, 2019; 7 years ago
- Written in: C++
- Operating system: Android, iOS, Linux, macOS
- Platform: ARM, x86
- License: Apache 2.0
- Website: openweave.io

Google released its implementation of Weave as an open source project, OpenWeave, on GitHub in June 2017 under the Apache 2.0 license.

== See also ==
- HomeKit
- Internet of things
- Z-Wave
- Zigbee
- Matter (standard)
