= Cortana (virtual assistant) =

Discontinued personal assistant developed and launched by Microsoft

- Logo

- Cortana white interface on Windows 10 Mobile
- Developer: Microsoft
- Release: April 2, 2014; 12 years ago

Final release(s)
- 2023 (v4.2308.1005.0) / August 11, 2023

Preview release(s) [±]
- Android: 3.3.3.2753 / November 29, 2019; 6 years ago
- Written in: C#, C++, with Microsoft .NET Framework
- Operating system: Windows, Windows Phone, iOS, Android, Xbox OS
- Platform: Windows Phone 8.1; Windows 10; Windows 10 Mobile; Windows 11 (until v22H2); Harman Kardon Invoke; Microsoft Band 2; Microsoft Band; Surface Headphones; Skype; Windows Mixed Reality; Amazon Alexa
- Successor: Microsoft Copilot (Formerly Bing Chat), and Voice Access
- Available in: English; French; Chinese (Mandarin); German; Spanish; Italian; Japanese; Brazilian Portuguese
- Type: Intelligent personal assistant
- License: Proprietary
- Website: www.microsoft.com/en-us/cortana

Cortana is a deprecated and discontinued virtual assistant developed by Microsoft and first released in April 2014 that used the Bing search engine to perform tasks such as setting reminders and answering questions for users.

Cortana was available in English, Portuguese, French, German, Italian, Spanish, Chinese, and Japanese language editions, depending on the software platform and region in which it was used.

In 2019, Microsoft began reducing the prevalence of Cortana and converting it from an assistant into different software integrations. It was split from the Windows 10 search bar in April 2019. In January 2020, the Cortana mobile app was removed from certain markets, and on March 31, 2021, the Cortana mobile app was shut down globally. On June 2, 2023, Microsoft announced that support for the Cortana standalone app on Microsoft Windows would end in late 2023 and would be replaced by Microsoft Copilot, an AI chatbot. Support for Cortana in the Microsoft Outlook and Microsoft 365 mobile apps was discontinued in late 2023.

== History ==
=== Beginnings (2009–2014) ===
The development of Cortana started in 2009 in the Microsoft Speech products team with general manager Zig Serafin and Chief Scientist Larry Heck. Heck and Serafin established the vision, mission, and long-range plan for Microsoft's digital personal assistant and they built a team with the expertise to create the initial prototypes for Cortana. Some of the key researchers in these early efforts included Microsoft Research researchers Dilek Hakkani-Tür, Gokhan Tur, Andreas Stolcke, and Malcolm Slaney, research software developer Madhu Chinthakunta, and user experience designer Lisa Stifelman. To develop the Cortana digital assistant, the team interviewed human personal assistants. The interviews inspired a number of unique features in Cortana, including the assistant's "notebook" feature. Originally, Cortana was meant to be only a codename, but a petition on Windows Phone's UserVoice site proved to be popular and made the codename official.

Cortana was demonstrated for the first time at the Microsoft Build developer conference in San Francisco in April 2014. It was launched as a key ingredient of Microsoft's planned "makeover" of future operating systems for Windows Phone and Windows.

The virtual assistant is named after the Halo character of the same name.

It was named after Cortana, a synthetic intelligence character in Microsoft's Halo video game franchise originating in Bungie folklore, with Jen Taylor, the character's voice actress, returning to voice the personal assistant's US-specific version.

=== Expansion (2015–2018) ===
In January 2015, Microsoft announced the availability of Cortana for Windows 10 desktops and mobile devices as part of merging Windows Phone into the operating system at large.

On May 26, 2015, Microsoft announced that Cortana would also be available on other mobile platforms. An Android release was set for July 2015, but the Android APK file containing Cortana was leaked ahead of its release. It was officially released, along with an iOS version, in December 2015.

During E3 2015, Microsoft announced that Cortana would come to the Xbox One as part of a universally designed Windows 10 update for the console.

Microsoft integrated Cortana into numerous products such as Microsoft Edge. Microsoft's Cortana assistant was deeply integrated into the browser. Cortana was able to find opening hours when on restaurant sites, show retail coupons for websites, or show weather information in the address bar. At the Worldwide Partners Conference 2015 Microsoft demonstrated Cortana integration with products such as GigJam. Conversely, Microsoft announced in late April 2016 that it would block anything other than Bing and Edge from being used to complete Cortana searches, again raising questions of anti-competitive practices by the company.

Microsoft's "Windows in the car" concept included Cortana. The concept makes it possible for drivers to make restaurant reservations and see places before they go there.

At Microsoft Build 2016, Microsoft announced plans to integrate Cortana into Skype (Microsoft's video-conferencing and instant messaging service) as a bot to allow users to order food, book trips, transcribe video messages and make calendar appointments through Cortana in addition to other bots. As of 2016, Cortana was able to underline certain words and phrases in Skype conversations that relate to contacts and corporations. A writer from Engadget has criticised the Cortana integration in Skype for responding only to very specific keywords, feeling as if she was "chatting with a search engine" due to the impersonal way the bots replied to certain words such as "Hello" causing the Bing Music bot to bring up Adele's song of that name.

Microsoft also announced at Microsoft Build 2016 that Cortana would be able to cloud-synchronise notifications between Windows 10 Mobile's and Windows 10's Action Center, as well as notifications from Android devices.

In December 2016, Microsoft announced the preview of Calendar.help, a service that enabled people to delegate the scheduling of meetings to Cortana. Users interact with Cortana by including her in email conversations. Cortana would then check people's availability in Outlook Calendar or Google Calendar, and work with others Cc'd on the email to schedule the meeting. The service relied on automation and human-based computation.

In May 2017, Microsoft announced INVOKE, a voice-activated speaker featuring Cortana, in collaboration with Harman Kardon. The premium speaker has a cylindrical design and offers 360-degree sound, the ability to make and receive calls with Skype, and all of the other features currently available with Cortana.

In 2017, Microsoft partnered with Amazon to integrate Echo and Cortana with each other, allowing users of each smart assistant to summon the other via a command. This feature preview was released in August 2018. Windows 10 users were able to just say "Hey Cortana, open Alexa" and Echo users were able to say "Alexa, open Cortana" to summon the other assistant.

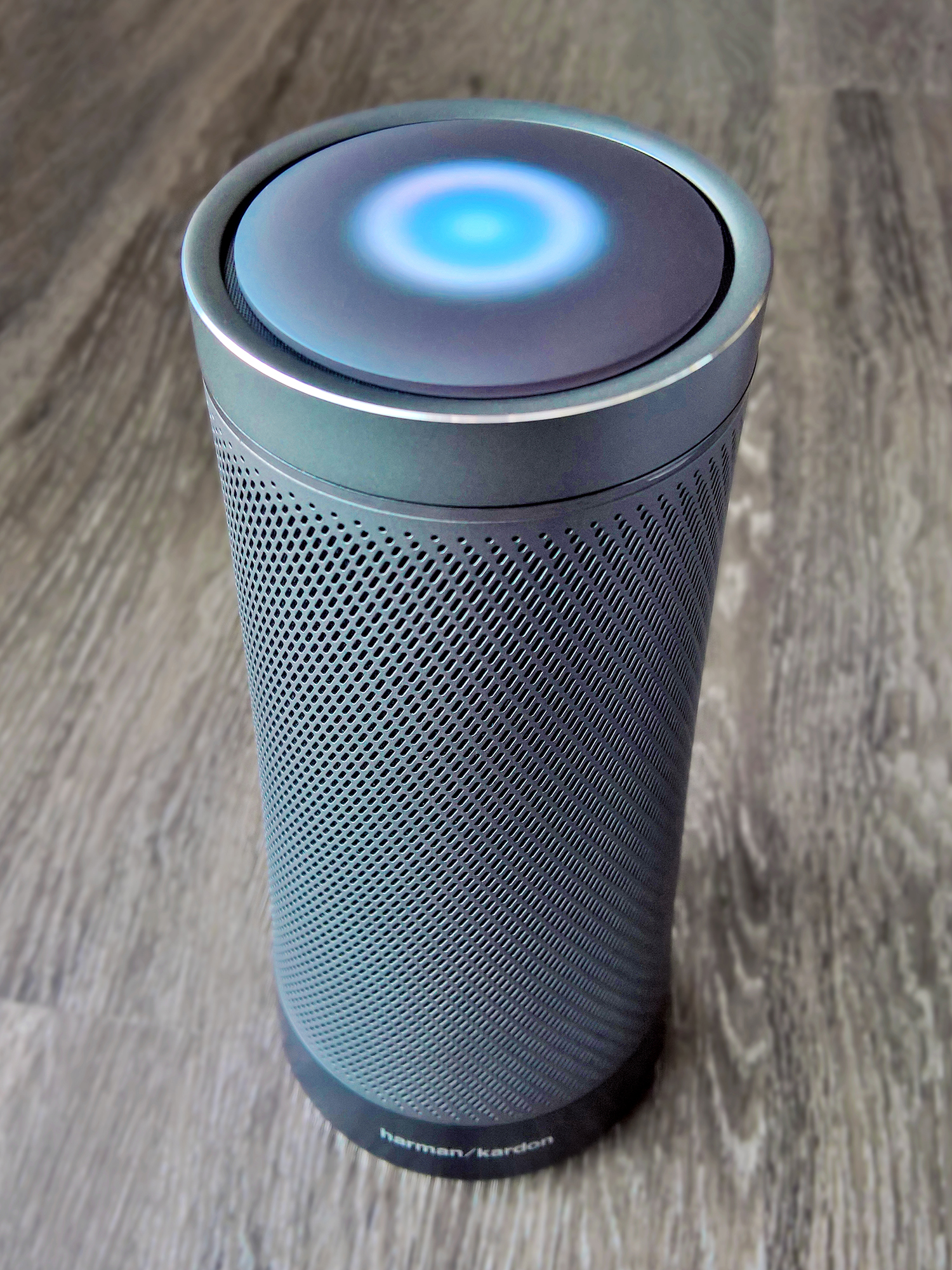
The Harman Kardon Invoke speaker, powered by Cortana

=== Decreasing focus and discontinuation (2019–2024) ===
In January 2019, Microsoft CEO Satya Nadella stated that he no longer saw Cortana as a direct competitor against Alexa and Siri.

Shortly thereafter, Microsoft began reducing the prevalence of Cortana and converting it from an assistant into different software integrations. It was split from the Windows 10 search bar in April 2019.

In January 2020, the Cortana mobile app was removed from certain markets, and then, on July 24, 2020, Cortana was removed from the Xbox dashboard as part of a redesign. On January 31, 2021, Microsoft removed the Cortana mobile application in many markets, including the UK, Australia, Germany, Mexico, China, Spain, Canada, and India.

On March 31, 2021, Microsoft shut down the Cortana apps globally for iOS and Android and removed the apps entirely from their corresponding app stores. To access previously recorded content, users had to use Cortana on Windows 10 or other specialized Microsoft applications.

Microsoft also reduced emphasis on Cortana in Windows with the 2021 release of Windows 11. Cortana was not used during the device setup process or pinned to the taskbar by default.

Cortana login screen on Windows 10 version 22H2, from 2022

On June 2, 2023, Microsoft announced the Cortana standalone app on Windows 10 and Windows 11 which would deprecate and shut down later in the year. In its support article, Microsoft listed several alternatives, most of which have since been rebranded as Microsoft Copilot. They also added that the change would not impact Cortana in Office 365 and Teams environments.

On August 11, 2023, Microsoft updated the Cortana standalone app in Windows, informing it was now deprecated and could no longer be used. Microsoft's support article announcing the deprecation of Cortana was updated to reflect this change. Along with the deprecation of the standalone app, it was announced that Cortana support in Teams mobile, Microsoft Teams displays, and Teams rooms would end in late 2023. The support article states that Cortana in the “Play my emails” feature of the Microsoft Outlook mobile app would continue to be available.

In late June 2024, the support article was updated, stating that Cortana in the voice search and the "Play my emails" feature were now removed from the Microsoft Outlook mobile app, officially marking the discontinuation of Cortana across all Microsoft products.

On May 22, 2024, Microsoft announced Windows 11, version 24H2, which removed Cortana, Tips, and WordPad from systems.

== Functionality ==
Cortana was able to set reminders, recognize natural voice without the requirement for keyboard input, and answer questions using information from the Bing search engine. Searches using Windows 10 are made only with the Microsoft Bing search engine, and all links will open with Microsoft Edge, except when a screen reader such as Narrator was being used, where the links will open in Internet Explorer. Windows Phone 8.1's universal Bing SmartSearch features were incorporated into Cortana, which replaced the previous Bing Search app, which was activated when a user presses the "Search" button on their device. Cortana includes a music recognition service. Cortana was able to simulate rolling dice and flipping a coin. Cortana's "Concert Watch" monitored Bing searches to determine the bands or musicians that interest the user. It integrates with the Microsoft Band watch band for Windows Phone devices if connected via Bluetooth, it was able to make reminders and phone notifications.

Since the Lumia Denim mobile phone series, launched in October 2014, active listening was added to Cortana enabling it to be invoked with the phrase: "Hey Cortana". It was able to then be controlled as usual. Some devices from the United Kingdom by O2 received the Lumia Denim update without the feature, but this was later clarified as a bug and Microsoft has since fixed it.

Cortana integrated with services such as Foursquare to provide restaurant and local attraction recommendations and LIFX to control smart light bulbs.

=== Notebook ===
Cortana stored personal information such as interests, location data, reminders, and contacts in the "Notebook". It was able to draw upon and add to this data to learn a user's specific patterns and behaviors. Users were able to view and specify what information was collected to allow some control over privacy, said to be "a level of control that goes beyond comparable assistants". Users were able to delete information from the "Notebook".

=== Reminders ===
Cortana had a built-in system of reminders, which were able to, for example, be associated with a specific contact; Cortana would then remind a user when in communication with that contact, possibly at a specific time or when the phone was in a specific location. Originally, these reminders were specific to the device Cortana was installed on but starting on February 12, 2015, Cortana synchronized reminders across devices.

=== Design ===
Most versions of Cortana took the form of two nested circles, which were animated to indicate activities such as searching or talking. The main color scheme would include a black or white background and shades of blue for the respective circles.

=== Phone notification syncing ===
Cortana on Windows mobile and Android were capable of capturing device notifications and sending them to a Windows 10 device. This allowed a computer user to view notifications from their phone in the Windows 10 Action Center. The feature was announced in early 2016 and released later in the year.

=== Miscellaneous ===
Cortana had a "do-not-disturb" mode in which users were able to specify "quiet hours", as was available for Windows Phone 8.1 users. Users were able to change the settings so that Cortana calls users by their names or nicknames. It also had a library of "Easter Eggs", pre-determined remarks.

When asked for a prediction, Cortana correctly predicted the winners of the first 14 matches of the football 2014 FIFA World Cup knockout stage, including the semi-finals, before it incorrectly picked Brazil over the Netherlands in the third place play-off match; this streak topped Paul the Octopus who correctly predicted all 7 of Germany's 2010 FIFA World Cup matches as well as the Final. Cortana was able to forecast results in various other sports such as the NBA, the NFL, the Super Bowl, the ICC Cricket World Cup and various European football leagues. Cortana was able to solve mathematical equations, convert units of measurement, and determine the exchange rates between currencies including Bitcoin.

== Integrations ==
Microsoft integrated Cortana into numerous products such as Microsoft Edge. Microsoft's Cortana assistant was deeply integrated into the browser. Cortana was able to find opening hours when on restaurant sites, show retail coupons for websites, or show weather information in the address bar. At the Worldwide Partners Conference 2015 Microsoft demonstrated Cortana integration with products such as GigJam. Conversely, Microsoft announced in late April 2016 that it would block anything other than Bing and Edge from being used to complete Cortana searches, again raising questions of anti-competitive practices by the company.

Microsoft's "Windows in the car" concept included Cortana. The concept makes it possible for drivers to make restaurant reservations and see places before they go there.

Cortana was able to integrate with third-party apps on Windows 10 or directly through the service. Starting in late 2016, Cortana integrated with Microsoft's Wunderlist service, allowing Cortana to add and act on reminders.

At Microsoft's Build 2017 conference, Microsoft announced that Cortana would get a consumer third-party skills capability, similar to that in Amazon Alexa.

On February 16, 2018, Microsoft announced connected home skills were added for Ecobee, Honeywell Lyric, Honeywell Total Connect Comfort, LIFX, TP-Link Kasa, and Geeni, as well as support for IFTTT. At Microsoft's Ignite 2018 conference, Microsoft announced an Technology Adopters Program that Enterprises could build skills that could be developed and deployed into Azure tenants, accessible by organizational units or security groups.

== Privacy concerns ==
Cortana indexed and stored user information. Cortana could be disabled; this would cause Windows search to search Bing as well as the local computer, but that could also be disabled. Turning Cortana off did not in itself delete user data stored on Microsoft's servers, but data was able to be deleted by user action. Microsoft was further criticized for requests to Bing's website for a file called "threshold.appcache", which contained Cortana's information through searches made through the Start Menu, even when Cortana was disabled on Windows 10.

As of April 2014, Cortana was disabled for users aged under 13 years.

== Regions and languages ==
The Chinese version of Cortana, Xiao Na

The British version of Cortana spoke with a British accent and used British idioms, while the Chinese version, known as Xiao Na, spoke Mandarin Chinese and had an icon featuring a face and two eyes, which was not used in other regions.

As of 2020 the English version of Cortana on Windows devices was available to all users in the United States (American English), Canada (French/English), Australia, India, and the United Kingdom (British English). Other language versions of Cortana are available in France (French), China (Simplified Chinese), Japan (Japanese), Germany (German), Italy (Italian), Brazil, Portugal (Portuguese), Mexico, and Spain (Spanish). Cortana listens generally to the hot word "Hey Cortana" in addition to certain languages' customized versions, such as "Hola Cortana" in Spanish.

The English United Kingdom localized version of Cortana was voiced by voice actress Ginnie Watson, while the United States localised version was voiced by Jen Taylor. Taylor was the voice actress who voices Cortana, the namesake of the virtual assistant, in the Halo video game series.

The following table identifies the former localized version of Cortana. Except where indicated, this applied to both Windows Mobile and Windows 10 versions of the assistant.

Language	Region	Variant	Status	Platforms
English	United States	American English	Available	Windows, Android, iOS
English	United Kingdom	British English	Available	Windows, Android
English	Canada	Canadian English	Available	Windows, Android, iOS
English	Australia	Australian English	Available	Windows, Android, iOS
English	India	Indian English	Available	Windows
French	France	European French	Available	Windows, Android, iOS
French	Canada	Canadian French	Available	Windows, Android, iOS
German	Germany	Standard German	Available	Windows
Italian	Italy	Standard Italian	Available	Windows
Spanish	Spain	European Spanish	Available	Windows
Spanish	Mexico	Mexican Spanish	Available	Windows
Traditional Chinese	Taiwan	Taiwanese Mandarin	Not Available	
Traditional Chinese	Hong Kong	Cantonese	Not Available	
Traditional Chinese	Macau	Cantonese	Not Available	
Simplified Chinese	China	Mandarin Chinese	Available	Windows, Android, iOS
Portuguese	Portugal	European Portuguese	Available	Windows
Portuguese	Brazil	Brazilian Portuguese	Available	Windows
Japanese	Japan	Standard Japanese	Available	Windows, iOS
Russian	Russia	Standard Russian	Not Available	Windows, iOS

== Technology ==
The natural language processing capabilities of Cortana were derived from Tellme Networks (bought by Microsoft in 2007) and were coupled with a Semantic search database called Satori.

While many of Cortana's U.S. English responses were voiced by Jen Taylor, organic responses required the use of a text-to-speech engine. Microsoft Eva was the name of the text-to-speech voice for organic response in Cortana's U.S. English.

== Updates ==
Cortana updates were delivered independently of those to the main Windows Phone OS, allowing Microsoft to provide new features at a faster pace. Not all Cortana-related features could be updated in this manner, as some features such as "Hey Cortana" required the Windows Phone update service and the Qualcomm Snapdragon SensorCore Technology.

== See also ==
- List of speech recognition software
- Siri
- Google Assistant
- Amazon Alexa
