= Amazon Echo Show =

Touchscreen smart speaker produced by Amazon

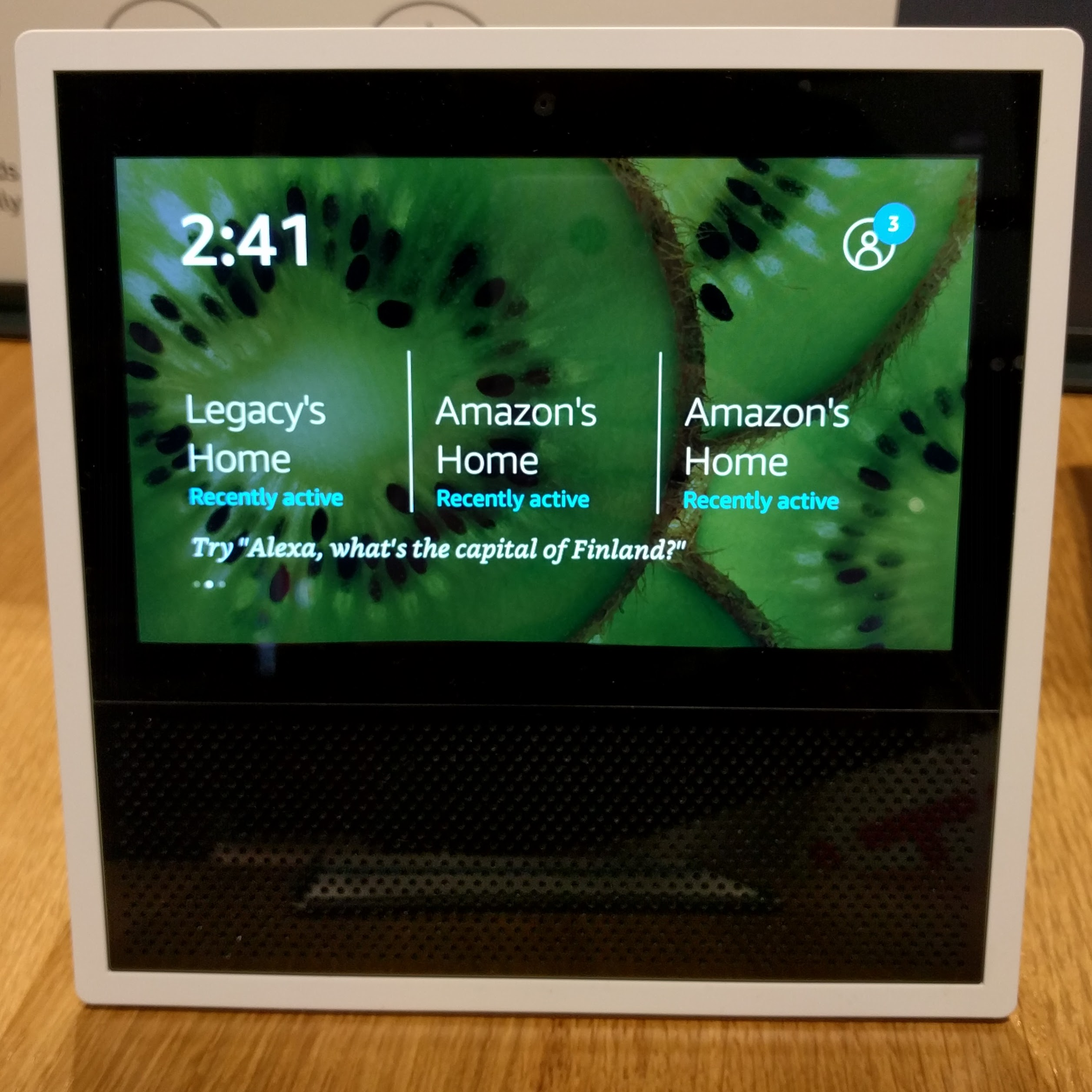
- The first-generation Echo Show in white
- Developer: Amazon
- Manufacturer: Amazon
- Type: Smart speaker
- Released: June 28, 2017 (First generation); October 11, 2018 (Second generation); February 25, 2021 (Third generation)
- Operating system: Fire OS (Used 2017-2023) (Android-based) Echo Ship/Vega OS (Used 2023+) (Linux-based)
- Input: Voice command, Touchscreen
- Connectivity: WiFi and Bluetooth
- Website: Amazon.com product listing

Amazon Echo Show is a smart speaker with a screen that is part of the Amazon Echo line of products. Similarly to other devices in the family, it is designed around Amazon's virtual assistant Alexa, but additionally features a touchscreen display that can be used to display visual information to accompany its responses, as well as play video and conduct video calls with other Echo Show users. The video call feature was later expanded to include all Skype and Zoom users.

The Echo Show was unveiled on May 9, 2017, and released in the United States on June 28, 2017. It has received positive reviews, with critics noting its improved sound quality over the standard Echo speaker, its simplicity, and how the screen is used to supplement Alexa rather than act as a full-featured tablet. Critics have also noted that many third-party Alexa functions have not been updated to fully utilize the screen.

== History ==
The Echo Show was unveiled on May 9, 2017, and released in the United States on June 28, 2017.

A second generation of the Echo Show was unveiled at an Alexa-themed product event by Amazon on September 20, 2018, for release the following month. This device has a 10 inches (250 mm) touchscreen, improved speakers, and mesh casing.

An Echo Show with a smaller, 5.5-inch screen was announced in May 2019 and launched in 12 countries in June 2019.

== Hardware ==
=== First generation ===
The first-generation Echo Show (released in June 2017) contains a pair of two-inch speakers and is distinguished from other Echo products by containing a 7-inch touchscreen. As with other Echo devices, it can conduct voice calls, as well as video calls to other Echo Show users and through Skype with its 5-megapixel front-facing camera.

=== Second generation ===
The second-generation Echo Show (released in October 2018) is completely redesigned from the first generation. The new device replaces the black plastic with a mesh casing while keeping the same device shape. The speakers were moved to the side and back of the device to allow a 3-inch larger display. Amazon claims that the new version will have better sound quality. It also integrates a Zigbee hub, similar to the Echo Plus.

=== Echo Show 5 ===
The Echo Show 5 is a variation with a 5.5-inch display.

=== Echo Show 8 ===
The Echo Show 8 is a variation with an 8" display, announced in September 2019 for shipment in November 2019.

=== Echo Show 10 (Third Generation) ===
The third-generation Echo Show (released in February 2021) changed the form factor to have a cylindrical speaker base with a screen which can rotate around it, with voice direction detection and computer vision human detection.

=== Echo Show 5 (Second Generation) ===
The Echo Show 5 was updated in June 2021 with an improved 2 MP camera.

=== Echo Show 8 (Second Generation) ===
The Echo Show 8 was updated in June 2021 with an improved 13 MP camera.

=== Echo Show 15 ===
The Echo Show 15 is a 15.6-inch, 1080p Full HD device designed to be wall-mounted (a departure from previous tabletop forms). Announced on September 28, 2021, in Amazon's 'Devices and Services Event' it also includes a 5 MP camera.

=== Echo Show 5 (Third Generation) ===
The Echo Show 5 was updated in 2023 with new processors, including the Amazon AZ2, and a larger speaker. This was also the first device to ever run Vega OS, Amazon's new OS as a replacement to FireOS on smart home devices.

=== Echo Show 8 (Third Generation) ===
The Echo Show 8 was updated in October, 2023 with a faster processor, spatial audio and supports Matter, Thread and Zigbee.

=== Echo Show 15 (Second Generation) ===
The Echo Show 15 was updated on November 20, 2024 with better audio quality and noise reduction, an upgraded auto-framing camera with more than double the field of view and 65% more zoom than 1st Gen Echo Show 15. It also acts as a Matter smart home hub, connecting directly to Thread and Zigbee devices. It is one of the first Echo devices (alongside the new Echo Show 21) to feature Wi-Fi 6E.

=== Echo Show 21 ===
The Echo Show 21 is a 21-inch, 1080p Full HD touchscreen device designed to be wall-mounted. It was announced by Amazon on November 20, 2024, "with nearly double the viewing area of" the newly introduced 2nd Gen Echo Show 15. It also acts as a Matter smart home hub, connecting directly to Thread and Zigbee devices. It is one of the first Echo devices (alongside the 2nd Gen Echo Show 15) to feature Wi-Fi 6E.

=== Echo Show 8 (Fourth Generation) ===
The Echo Show 8 was redesigned and is available with an improved AZ3 Pro processor, changed styling, an improved 8.7" HD touchscreen, built-in smart home hub, and Omnisense technology for highly personalized experiences.

=== Echo Show 11 ===
The new Echo Show 11 is a larger version of the 4th Gen Echo Show 8, with all the above features.

=== Comparison ===
Model	Echo Show (1st Gen)	Echo Show (2nd Gen)	Echo Show 5 (1st Gen)	Echo Show 8 (1st Gen)	Echo Show 10 (3rd Gen)	Echo Show 5 (2nd Gen)	Echo Show 8 (2nd Gen)	Echo Show 15 (1st Gen)	Echo Show 5 (3rd Gen)	Echo Show 8 (3rd Gen)	Echo Show 15 (2nd Gen)	Echo Show 21 (1st Gen)	Echo Show 8 (4th Gen)	Echo Show 11 (1st Gen)
Released	June 2017	October 2018	June 2019	November 2019	February 2021	June 2021	June 2021	September 2021	May 2023	October 2023	November 2024	November 2024	November 2025	November 2025
Processor	Intel Atom x5-Z8350	Intel Atom x5-Z8350	MediaTek MT8163	MediaTek MT8163	MediaTek MT8183 + Amazon AZ1	MediaTek MT8163	MediaTek MT8183	Amlogic PopcornA + Amazon AZ2	MediaTek MT8169B + Amazon AZ2	Octa-Core SoC + AZ2 Engine	Octa-Core SoC + AZ2 Engine	Octa-Core SoC + AZ2 Engine	AZ3 Pro with AI Accelerator	AZ3 Pro with AI Accelerator
Screen size	7"	10.1"	5.5"	8"	10.1"	5.5"	8"	15.6"	5.5"	8"	15.6"	21"	8.7"	11"
Resolution	1024×600	1280×800	960×480	1280×800	1280×800	960×480	1280×800	1920×1080	960×480	1280×800	1920x1080	1920x1080	1340x800	1920x1200
Camera	5 MP	5 MP	1 MP	1 MP	13 MP	2 MP	13 MP	5 MP	2 MP	13 MP auto-framing	13 MP auto-framing	13 MP auto-framing	13 MP auto-framing	13 MP auto-framing
Microphone /camera off button	✔ (top)	✔	✔	✔	✔	✔	✔	✔	✔	✔	✔	✔	✔ (side)	✔ (side)
Camera cover			✔	✔	✔	✔	✔	✔	✔	✔	✔	✔	-	-
Zigbee hub		✔			✔					✔	✔	✔	✔	✔
Matter hub									"compatible"	✔	✔	✔	✔	✔
Thread radio										✔	✔	✔	✔	✔
Speakers	2 × 2"	2 × 2.2", 10 W	1 × 1.7", 4 W	2 × 2.0", 10 W	2 × 1.0” tweeters + 3.0” woofer	1 × 1.7", 4 W	2 × 2.0", 10 W	2 × 1.6"	1 × 1.75"	2 × 2.0"	2 × 2” woofers + 2 × 0.6” tweeters	2 × 2” woofers + 2 × 0.6” tweeters	2.8” woofer + 2 full-range drivers	2.8” woofer + 2 full-range drivers
Motorized Rotation					✔									
Alexa+ Compatible					✔	✔		✔	✔	✔	✔	✔	✔	✔

== Features ==
The screen on Echo Show can be used to display visual output for Alexa assistant responses. The devices contain motion sensors to automatically wake its screen when someone enters a room; in this state, it can also display prompts regarding news headlines, suggested Alexa commands, and other information. Alexa can also be used to request the playback of videos on its screen, such as Amazon Video content.

The "Drop In" feature allows users to, between designated contacts, automatically begin a call unannounced.

The Echo Show initially supported YouTube videos; on September 26, 2017, it was revealed that Google (who manufactures Google Home, a direct competitor to the Amazon Echo line) had blocked the device's access to the service, citing violations of its terms of service and ongoing negotiations. While Amazon later worked around the restriction by using the web version, Google announced that it would block YouTube from the Echo Show, as well as the Fire TV platform, citing Amazon's ongoing restrictions against the sale of products which compete with its own video ecosystem, and refusal to support its own video platform on Google devices. At the launch of the second-generation Echo Show, Amazon claimed that the issue was now fixed. YouTube searches are now performed using the Silk or Firefox web browsers on the device.

== Security ==
In November 2019, a security research team in the Pwn2Own hacking contest hacked into an Amazon Echo Show 5. They did so by hacking into the "patch gap" that meshed older software patched onto other platforms, as the smart screen used an old version of Chromium. The security team exploited the code using "an integer overflow JavaScript bug to hijack the device while it was connected to a malicious WiFi network." The bug allowed them to take "full control" of the device. The team shared the findings with Amazon, which said it was investigating the hack, and would take "appropriate steps."

In 2025, a community developer published methods for unlocking the bootloader and installing a custom recovery (TWRP) on the first-generation Amazon Echo Show 5 (codename checkers) and Amazon Echo Show 8 (codename crown). The work, hosted on developer forums and accompanied by publicly available source code, describes exploit-based procedures and warns of a significant risk of device bricking.

The published procedure describes two exploit variants: a user-facing method that leverages the device's fastboot interface (intended for functional devices) and a second, lower-level method that abuses the device bootrom (BROM/USBDL) path. The latter method only works on units manufactured in 2019, as Amazon disabled BROM USBDL access on later hardware revisions; it is principally useful for recovering bricked units or devices that cannot be updated to a vulnerable firmware version.

Additionally, unofficial builds of LineageOS 18.1 (based on Android 11) were released in 2025 for both devices. These community ROMs replace the stock Fire OS firmware and allow the devices to function more like conventional Android tablets.

== Reception ==
The Verge compared the Echo Show to previous "internet appliances" such as the 3Com Audrey and Chumby, but acknowledged that neither of them was equipped with a voice-activated virtual assistant, and both were built with too much functionality. In comparison, Amazon was praised for having intentionally limited the amount of touchscreen-oriented functionality on the Echo Show, so that the device would not be complex. It was noted that few third-party Alexa Skills actually took advantage of the screen, and there were limited options for video services that integrated with Alexa. The sound quality of the Echo Show was perceived as being superior to the standard Echo, but lower than other dedicated speakers at the same price point. The camera was also panned for being angled upwards (thus making it harder for shorter people to use), and for not handling backlighting well. In conclusion, it was felt that "from nearly any other company, adding a screen would have resulted in feature-itis of the worst kind. By holding back, the Echo Show feels like it does more. Its strength is in its simplicity."

Pocket-lint felt that the white model had an "air of modern", but the black model looked "kind of dated, oddly boxy, and just downright blah to us". The updated mesh fabric covering on the second-generation product addressed these complaints. Its sound quality was praised for being able to "fill your entire room and then some", and the ability to look up and view YouTube videos was "not the fastest experience", but "quick enough and has yet to glitch out on us." The "Drop In" feature was praised as being potentially useful for checking on "elderly loved ones". The device was also praised for integrating with smart home products (such as home security cameras, which can display their feeds on the screen). However, it was felt that the "unfinished" Alexa still hampered the experience (noting an error where it played the film Creed when asked to play music by the band Creed), and that some Skills had not been updated to fully support the screen, but that "if nothing else, it is fun to poke around and explore what else Alexa can do." In conclusion, it was argued that at its price point, it could have featured higher-quality speakers and a full OS with an app store, but the sound quality alone justified its higher price over the original Echo.

In a review of the second-generation model, Pocket-lint praised its improvements to audio quality (albeit being "bass-heavy"), screen size, Zigbee support, and "neater" design. The display was panned for being too reflective and having a near-720p resolution. In addition, it was noted that optimization of third-party Skills for the Echo Show was still inconsistent.

Reports suggest that Amazon has increased the frequency of full screen ads.

== See also ==
- Google Nest Hub (Smart displays)
- Home automation
