= Invoke (smart speaker) =

Cortana-powered smart speaker by Harman Kardon

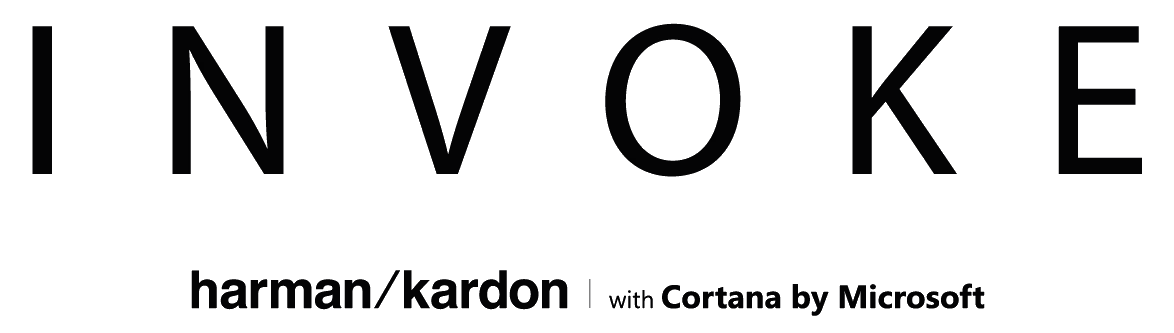

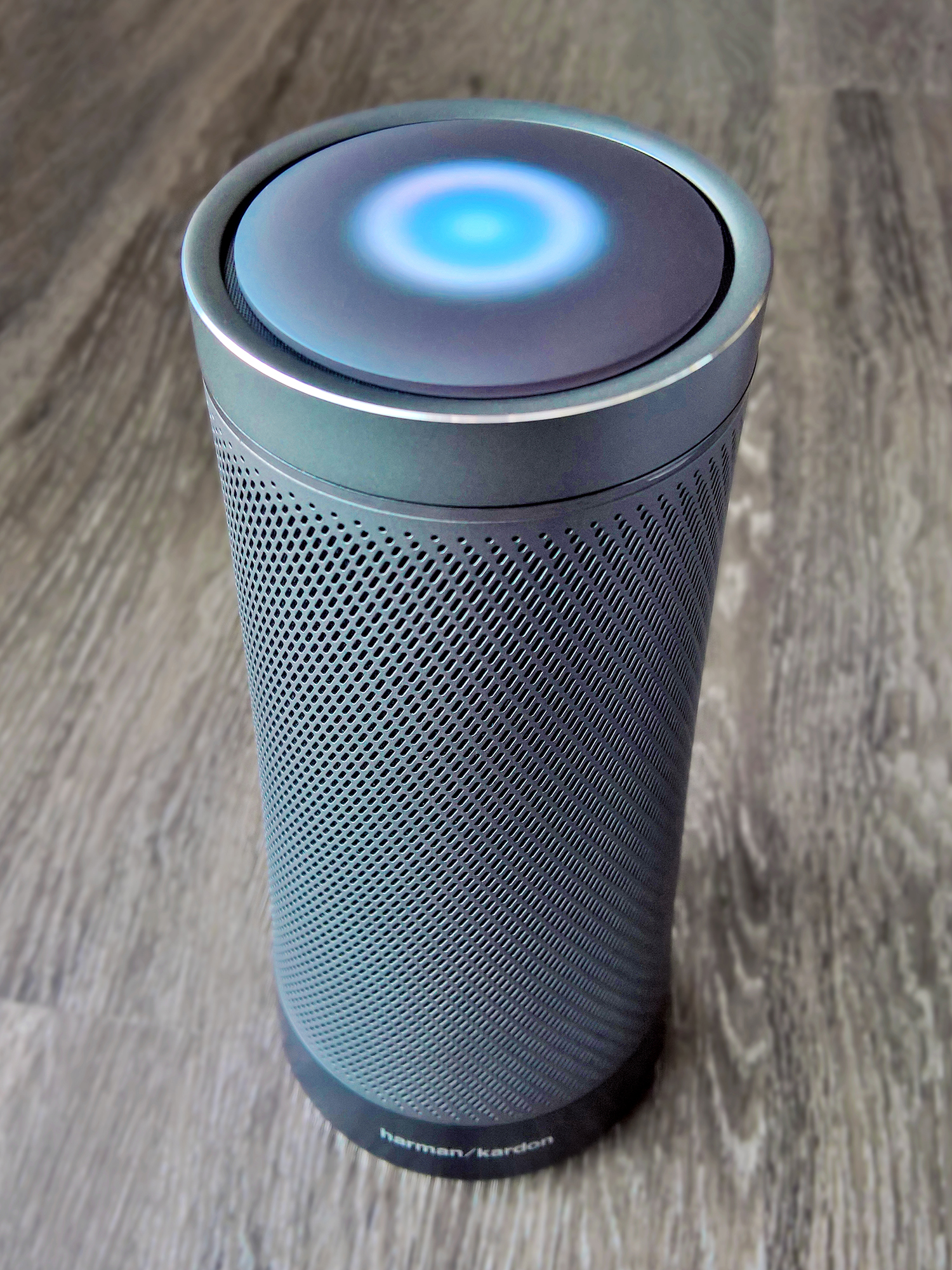
- Developer: Harman Kardon
- Type: Smart speaker
- Released: October 22, 2017; 8 years ago (United States)
- Introductory price: US$199
- Operating system: Linux
- Input: Voice commands/limited physical touch surface
- Connectivity: Wi-Fi dual-band (2.4/5 GHz) IEEE 802.11/b/g/n/ac, BT 4.1
- Dimensions: 4.2 in (106.68 mm) diameter, 9.5 in (241.30 mm) high
- Weight: 2.3 lb (1 kg)
- Website: Harman Kardon Invoke

Invoke (stylized as INVOKE) was a smart speaker developed by Harman Kardon. It was powered by Microsoft's intelligent personal assistant, Cortana. Voice interaction with Cortana provides features such as setting alarms, facts, searches, weather, news, traffic, flights, and other real-time information. Additionally, the speaker's Cortana integration with one's Microsoft Account enabled calendars, reminders, commutes, to-do lists, and home automation features, among others.

The device supported music streaming from Spotify, iHeartRadio, and TuneIn. and was also the first smart speaker to support voice calls using Skype. The inside of the speaker consists of seven far-field microphones, three woofers, three tweeters, two passive radiators, and a 40-watt amplifier.

== History ==
=== Release ===
In December 2016, Microsoft announced it was partnering with Harman Kardon to develop a Cortana-powered smart speaker for release in 2017 and teased a preview of the device on YouTube.

The device was officially unveiled on October 2, 2017 and became available for purchase on October 22, 2017 at Microsoft Store and select retailers, such as Best Buy, for an introductory price of $199.95. Over the Thanksgiving weekend during Black Friday sales, the speaker was discounted to $99.

=== End of life ===
Microsoft announced in July 2020 that they would end support for Cortana on the Invoke speaker in January 2021. The speaker received an update in 2021 to make it into an ordinary Bluetooth speaker. Microsoft offered a $50 gift card to Invoke owners who had used the Cortana feature after July 31, 2019 and before its end-of-life announcement.

== Features ==
=== Standalone audio ===
By itself, the Harman Kardon Invoke can function as a standalone Bluetooth wireless speaker and also has Spotify Connect integration for audio streaming. Manufactured by a home audio equipment manufacturer, the Invoke contains 3 woofers and 3 tweeters for full range, 360-degree sound as well as 2 passive radiators which aid the bass performance in a small enclosure.

=== Cortana ===
The integration of Microsoft's Cortana brand smart speaker features to the Invoke including virtual assistant, music streaming, home automation, and calls to/from mobile and landlines, as well as Skype-to-Skype calls, all via Skype.

Cortana could be activated through saying the wake phrase "Hey Cortana" or by a three-second long touch of the capacitive touch area on the top of the speaker. Cortana can then subsequently be controlled through voice commands in the same way it can be controlled on Windows 10, Windows 10 Mobile, Windows Phone 8.1, Xbox One, iOS, Android devices.

Because Cortana synchronizes with one's Microsoft account, the Invoke offered interoperability between all devices on which a user has Cortana, such as their phone, allowing for synchronization with a user's Cortana Notebook including appointments, reminders, lists, places, lifestyle recommendations, traffic, commutes, packages, flights, alarms, weather, and news topics.

The Invoke also had access to Cortana Skills Kit which enabled features such as home automation, music streaming, and other mobile app integration.

== Reception ==
Initial reviews praised the Invoke for both its high end design and build quality as well as its superior sound quality versus competitors such as Amazon Echo and Google Home, and called it "a compelling option for anyone who values music quality".

Molly Price of CNET compared the Invoke to Amazon Echo and Google Home, noting that the Invoke's metal outer casing design, smooth-turning volume control, and touchpad, "feels high-end, and that's good news for a speaker with a higher price tag than the Amazon Echo and Google Home." She also found "the Invoke's 360-degree sound to deliver fuller bass and cleaner treble than Amazon's Echo line of speakers." Another CNET editor, Ty Pendlebury, compared the Invoke to Alexa-powered Sonos One and "found it well matched -- though each speaker had its strengths and weaknesses"

Engadget's Devindra Hardawar highly praised the Invoke's audio quality, stating "It sounds amazing, so it's particularly well-suited for audiophiles" and that "Invoke's audio is much richer and nuanced, while the Echo sounds cheap and flat by comparison." He also noted the high build quality, mentioning the "huge difference in build quality: The Echo is made entirely of plastic, while the Invoke features a more premium-feeling metallic case, with only a bit of plastic around the base. Even the control dial feels much better than the Echo's; it turns more smoothly and feels like controlling a piece of high-end audio gear." Hardawar credited Harman Kardon's long history in the audio equipment industry for its success of Invoke's as an audio device.

Both reviews also mentioned that while (at the time of Invoke's release) Microsoft's Cortana was behind other assistants in terms of skillset, that Microsoft and Amazon's partnership to integrate Alexa into Cortana, and vice versa would soon resolve that shortfall. As of February 2020, this has not happened.

== See also ==
- Amazon Echo
- Google Home
- HomePod
