= Bing Audio =

- Developer(s): Microsoft
- Operating system: Windows Phone (7.5+)
- Type: Music Recognition Software
- License: Proprietary

Bing Audio (also known as Bing Music) was a music recognition application created by Microsoft which is installed on Windows Phones running version 7.5 and above, including Windows Phone 8. On Windows Phone 8.1, and in regions where the Microsoft Cortana voice assistant is available, Bing Music is integrated with Cortana and the music search history is a part of Cortana's "Notebook".

The service is only designed to recognize recorded songs, not live performances or humming. Xbox Music Pass subscribers can immediately add the songs to their playlists. A unique feature compared to similar services is that Bing Audio continuously listens and analyzes music while most other services can only listen for a fixed amount of time. Bing Research developed a fingerprinting algorithm to identify songs.

On March 30, 2016, Microsoft announced they will create bots based on Bing features in Skype, which Bing Music was one such feature.

As of 2025, Windows Phone, Cortana, Xbox Music Pass, and Skype have all been discontinued and the feature does not appear in the Bing mobile app, likely meaning the service has been discontinued although no official statement has been issued by Microsoft.

== See also ==
- Gracenote's MusicID-Stream
- Play by Yahoo Music
- Shazam
- Sony TrackID
- SoundHound
- Groove Music (known as Zune in versions prior to Windows Phone 8, and as Xbox Music in Windows Phone 8.x)
