= Microsoft Inspire =

Annual conference

- Genre: Conference
- Frequency: Annually
- Venue: Varies each year
- Location: Varies each year
- Country: United States
- Years active: 2003–2023
- Inaugurated: July 12, 2002
- Most recent: July 19, 2023
- Organiser: Microsoft
- Sponsor: Main sponsors: Huawei, Tech Data. BitTitan and Dell EMC
- Website: partner.microsoft.com/en-us/inspire

Microsoft Inspire (formerly the Microsoft Worldwide Partner Conference) was a conference held annually by the Microsoft Corporation for its partner community. It was announced in 2024 that it would be replaced by Microsoft's new virtual event, MCAPS Start for Partners.

At Inspire, partners are taught about Microsoft's roadmap for the upcoming year, network and build connections, share best practices, experience the latest product innovations, and learn new skills and techniques. There are also keynote addresses from Microsoft executives, featured speakers, business-track specific offerings, and hundreds of sessions.

In its current form, it has been held since 2003. Before 2003, it was two different events, Microsoft Fusion and the Microsoft Business Solutions Stampede. In recent years, not including the Virtual Online events, it has been co-located with the Microsoft internal Microsoft Ready conference.

Year	Dates	Venue	Location	Participants (est.)
2002	July 12–15	Los Angeles Convention Center	Los Angeles, California	4,700
2003	October 9–11	Morial Convention Center	New Orleans	5,500
2004	July 11–13	Metro Toronto Convention Centre	Toronto, Canada	5,500 attendees
2005	July 8–10	Minneapolis Convention Center	Minneapolis	10,000 attendees 6,500 Microsoft employees
2006	August 11–13		Boston, Massachusetts	
2007	July 10–12	Colorado Convention Center	Denver, Colorado	
2008	July		Houston, Texas	
2009	July 13	New Orleans Morial Convention Center	New Orleans	
2010	July 11–15	Washington Convention Center	Washington, D.C.	13,000
2011	July 10–14		Los Angeles, California	
2012	July 8–12	Metro Toronto Convention Centre and the Air Canada Centre	Toronto, Ontario	15,000
2013	July 7–11		Houston, Texas	
2014	July 13–17	Walter E. Washington Convention Center	Washington, D.C.	
2015	July 12–16	Orange County Convention Center	Orlando, Florida	
2016	July 10–14	Metro Toronto Convention Centre and the Air Canada Centre	Toronto, Canada	
2017	July 9–13	Walter E. Washington Convention Center	Washington, D.C.	16,000
2018	July 14–19	Mandalay Bay Convention Center	Las Vegas, Nevada	17,000
2019	July 13–19	Mandalay Bay Convention Center	Las Vegas, Nevada	
2020	July 21–23	Virtual Online Event	Worldwide	
2021	July 14–15	Virtual Online Event	Worldwide	
2022	July 19–20	Virtual Online Event	Worldwide	
2023	July 18–19	Virtual Online Event	Worldwide	
