= Google Assistant =

Defunct virtual assistant from Google

- Screenshot Google Assistant on the Pixel smartphone
- Developer: Google
- Release: May 18, 2016; 10 years ago

Stable release(s) [±]
- Android: 0.1 (Build 884448652) / 23 March 2026; 7 months ago
- iOS (Note: Including iPadOS): 1.9.148701 / July 23, 2025; 15 months ago
- Written in: C++
- Operating system: Android 6+; iOS 15+; Linux, Android TV, Discontinued: Chromebook, ChromeOS; Chrome, Wear OS (2026); LG TV (2025); KaiOS (2021)
- Platform: Android; Google Nest; Android TV; Chrome; Chromebook; ChromeOS; Smart speakers; Headphones; KaiOS; LG TV; Smart displays; Google Allo; iOS; iPadOS; Ubuntu; Raspberry Pi; Wear OS
- Predecessor: Google Now
- Successor: Google Gemini
- Available in: English, Arabic, Bengali, Chilean Spanish, Colombian Spanish, Chinese (Simplified), Chinese (Traditional), Danish, Dutch, French, German, Gujarati, Hindi, Hindi (Traditional), Indonesian, Italian, Japanese, Kannada, Korean, Malayalam, Marathi, Norwegian, Polish, Portuguese, Russian, Spanish, Swedish, Tamil, Telugu, Thai, Turkish, Urdu, Vietnamese
- Type: Virtual assistant
- License: Proprietary
- Website: assistant.google.com

Google Assistant is a virtual assistant software application and cloud-based service developed by Google that was primarily available on home automation and mobile devices. Based on artificial intelligence, Google Assistant could engage in two-way conversations, unlike the company's previous virtual assistant, Google Now.

Users primarily interacted with Google Assistant through natural voice, though keyboard input was also supported. Assistant was able to answer questions, schedule events and alarms, adjust hardware settings on the user's device, show information from the user's Google account, play games, and other features. Over time, it also gained abilities such as identifying objects using a device's camera, purchasing products and sending money. By 2020, it was available on more than 1 billion devices, used by more than 500 million users monthly, and was available in more than 90 countries and over 30 languages.

Google Assistant debuted in 2016, as part of Google's instant messenger Allo, and its voice-activated speaker Google Nest, and for a period of time was exclusive on the Google Pixel smartphones. By 2018, Google Assistant availability was expanded to all Android devices as well as iOS, wearable and smart home devices, cars, smart displays and other consumer electronics.

The last Pixel models to feature Assistant was the Pixel 8 series, which later experimented with "Assistant with Bard" (now Gemini).

On September 28, 2026, Google ended support of Assistant for mobile users and fully replaced it with the LLM-based chatbot Google Gemini, and was discontinued on Android devices running Android 9 and later. The option to switch between Gemini and Google Assistant was also removed. Assistant still runs on Android devices running Android 8 and older, as well as cars and smart home devices that have not yet made the planned transition to Gemini.

== History ==
Google Assistant was unveiled during Google's developer conference on May 18, 2016, as part of the announcement of the Google Nest smart speaker and messaging app Allo; Google CEO Sundar Pichai explained that the Assistant was designed to be a conversational and two-way experience, and "an ambient experience that extends across devices". Later that month, Google assigned Google Doodle leader Ryan Germick and hired former Pixar animator Emma Coats to develop "a little more of a personality".

=== Platform expansion ===
Google Assistant in Spanish

For system-level integration outside of the Allo app and Google Nest, the Google Assistant was initially exclusive to the Google Pixel smartphones. In February 2017, Google announced that it had begun to enable access to the Assistant on Android smartphones running Android 6.0.1 or 7.0, beginning in select English-speaking markets. Android tablets did not receive the Assistant as part of this rollout. The Assistant was also integrated in Wear OS 2.0, and would be included in future versions of Android TV and Android Auto. In October 2017, the Google Pixelbook became the first laptop to include Google Assistant. In November 2017, Google Assistant was added to the Google Pixel Buds. In December 2017, Google announced that the Assistant would be released for phones running Android 5.0 through an update to Google Play Services, as well as tablets running 6.0 Marshmallow and 7.0 Nougat. In February 2019, Google reportedly began testing ads in Google Assistant results.

==== iOS ====
On May 15, 2017, Android Police reported that the Google Assistant would be available on the iOS operating system as a separate app. The information was confirmed two days later at Google's developer conference.

==== Smart displays ====
In January 2018, at the Consumer Electronics Show, the first Assistant-powered "smart displays" were released. Smart displays were shown at the event from Lenovo, Sony, JBL and LG. These devices had support for Google Duo video calls, YouTube videos, Google Maps directions, a Google Calendar agenda, viewing of smart camera footage, in addition to services which work with Google Home devices.

These devices were based on Android Things and Google-developed software. Google unveiled its own smart display, Google Nest Hub in October 2018, and later Google Nest Hub Max, which utilized a different system platform.

=== Developer support ===
In December 2016, Google launched "Actions on Google", a developer platform for the Google Assistant. Actions on Google allowed third party developers to build apps for Google Assistant. In March 2017, Google added new tools for developing on Actions on Google to support the creation of games for Google Assistant. Originally limited to the Google Nest smart speaker, Actions on Google became available to Android and iOS devices in May 2017, at which time Google also introduced an app directory or application directory for overview of compatible products and services. To incentivize developers to build Actions, Google announced a competition, in which first place won tickets to Google's 2018 developer conference, $10,000, and a walk-through of Google's campus, while second place and third place received $7,500 and $5,000, respectively, and a Google Home.

In April 2017, a software development kit (SDK) was released, allowing third-party developers to build their own hardware that could run the Google Assistant. It was integrated into Raspberry Pi, cars from Audi and Volvo, and Home automation appliances, including fridges, washers, and ovens, from companies including iRobot, LG, General Electric, and D-Link. Google updated the SDK in December 2017 to add several features that only the Google Home smart speakers and Google Assistant smartphone apps had previously supported.

The features included:

- Third-party device makers can incorporate their own "Actions on Google" commands for their respective products
- Text-based interactions and many languages
- Users can set a precise geographic location for the device to enable improved location-specific queries.

On May 2, 2018, Google announced a new program that focuses on investing in the future of Google Assistant through early-stage startups. Their focus was to build an environment where developers could build richer experiences for their users. This included startups that broaden Assistant's features, building new hardware devices, or simply differentiating in different industries.

=== Voices ===
Google Assistant launched using the voice of Kiki Baessell for the American female voice, who is also the voice for the Google Voice voicemail system since 2010.

On October 11, 2019, Google announced that Issa Rae had been added to Google Assistant as an optional voice, which could be enabled by the user by telling Google to "talk like Issa". This option, however, was discontinued by April 2022.

=== Launches of Bard and Gemini ===
In October 2023, a mobile version of the Gemini chatbot, originally titled Assistant with Bard and simply Bard, was announced during the Pixel 8 event. It was set to replace Assistant as the main assistant on Android devices, although the original Assistant would remain optional. However, Samsung, the largest Android device manufacturer, rejected Google's plan and stated that it would continue to develop its own Bixby assistant that ships side-by-side with Google Assistant on its hardware. The Google Bard chatbot was released on February 8, 2024, in the United States.

On March 14, 2025, it was announced that Assistant would no longer be supported on Android devices using Android 9 and higher, iOS, and other devices such as the Google Nest, being mostly replaced by Gemini. Assistant remained available for low-range phones, phones running Android 8.1 "Oreo" and lower, and devices running Android Go.

=== Discontinuation ===
In August 2026, Google announced that Assistant would no longer be supported on September 4, 2026, and encouraged Assistant users to switch to Gemini. On September 28, 2026, Assistant was automatically redirected to Gemini on phones running Android 9 and later, as well as newer smart home devices.

== Interaction ==
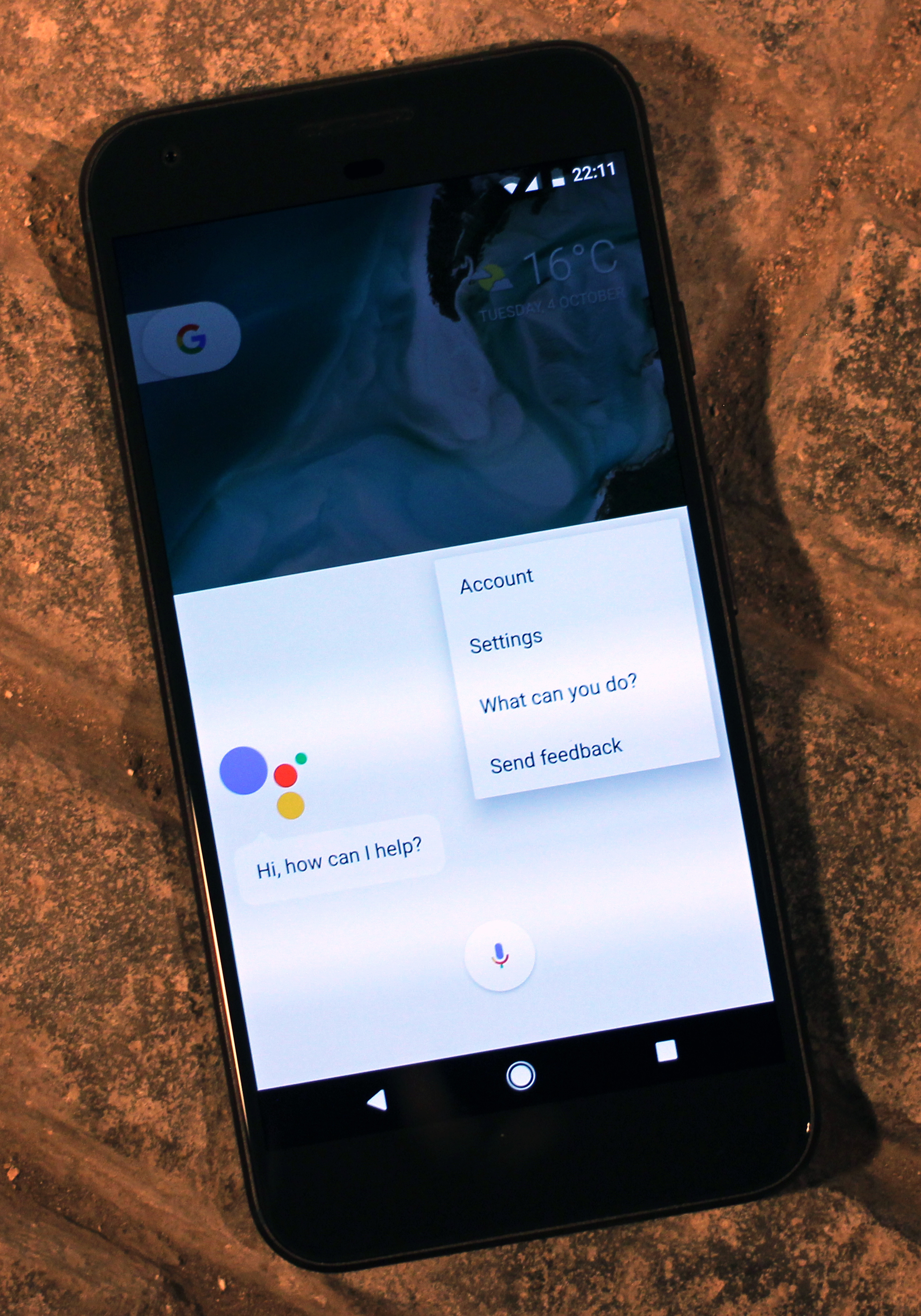
The Google Assistant on the Google Pixel XL phone

Google Assistant, in the nature and manner of Google Now, could search the internet, schedule events and alarms, adjust hardware settings on the user's device, and show information from the user's Google account. Unlike Google Now, however, the Assistant could engage in a two-way conversation, using Google's natural language processing algorithm. Search results were presented in a card format that users could open the page. In February 2017, Google announced that users of Google Home would be able to shop entirely by voice for products through its Google Express shopping service, with products available from Whole Foods Market, Costco, Walgreens, PetSmart, and Bed Bath & Beyond at launch, and other retailers added in the following months as new partnerships were formed. Google Assistant could maintain a shopping list; this was previously done within the notetaking service GKeep, but the feature was moved to Google Express and the Google Home app in April 2017.

In May 2017, Google announced that the Assistant would support a keyboard for typed input and visual responses, support identifying objects and gather visual information through the device's camera, and support purchasing products and sending money. Through the use of the keyboard, users could view a history of queries made to the Google Assistant, and edit or delete previous inputs. The Assistant informed the user against deleting, however, due to its use of previous inputs to generate better answers in the future. In November 2017, Assistant added the ability to identify songs that were playing by asking the Assistant.

The Google Assistant allowed users to activate and modify vocal shortcut commands in order to perform actions on their device (both Android and iPad/iPhone) or configure it as a hub for home automation.

This feature of the speech recognition was available in English, among other languages. In July 2018, the Google Home version of Assistant gained support for multiple actions triggered by a single vocal shortcut command.

At the 2018 I/O developers conference on May 8, 2018, Google's SEO announced the addition of six new voice options for the Google Assistant, including John Legend's voice. This was created by WaveNet, a voice synthesizer developed by DeepMind, which significantly reduced the amount of audio samples that a voice actor was required to produce for creating a voice model. However, John Legend's Google Assistant cameo voice was discontinued on March 23, 2020.

In August 2018, Google added bilingual capabilities to the Google Assistant for existing supported languages on devices. It was reported that it would support multilingual support by setting a third default language on Android Phone.

Speech-to-Text could recognize commas, question marks, and periods in transcription requests.

In April 2019, the most popular audio games in the Assistant, "Crystal Ball", and "Lucky Trivia", was reported to have the biggest voice changes in the application's history. The voice in the assistant was able to add expression to the games. For instance, in the "Crystal Ball" game, the voice would speak slowly and softly during the intro and before the answer was revealed to make the game more exciting, and in the "Lucky Trivia" game, the voice would become excitable like a game show host. In the British accent voice of "Crystal Ball", the voice would say the word "probably" in a downward slide if the voice is unsure. The games used the text-to-speech voice which made the voice more robotic. However, in May 2019, it was revealed to be a bug in the speech API that caused the games to lose the studio-quality voices. These audio games were fixed in May 2019.

=== Interpreter Mode ===
On December 12, 2019, Google debuted an interpreter mode in Google Assistant smartphone apps for Android and iOS. It provides translation of conversations in real-time and was previously only available on Google Home smart speakers and displays. Google Assistant won the 2020 Webby Award for Best User Experience in the category Apps, Mobile & Voice.

On March 5, 2020, Google introduced a feature on Google Assistant that read webpages aloud in 42 languages.

On October 15, 2020, Google announced a "hum to search" function to find a song by simply humming, whistling, or singing the song.

=== Google Duplex ===
In May 2018, Google revealed Duplex, an extension of the Google Assistant that allowed it to have natural conversations by portraying a human voice, in a manner not dissimilar to robocalling. The assistant could autonomously complete tasks such as calling a hair salon to book an appointment, scheduling a restaurant reservation, or calling businesses to verify holiday store hours. While Duplex could complete most of its tasks fully autonomously, it was able to recognize situations that it was unable to complete and would signal a human operator to finish the task. Duplex was created to speak in a more natural voice and language by incorporating speech disfluencies such as filler words like "hmm" and "uh" and using common phrases such as "mhm" and "gotcha", along with more human-like intonation and response latency. Duplex had a limited release in 2018 for Google Pixel users. During the limited release, Pixel phone users in Atlanta, New York, Phoenix, and San Francisco were only able to use Duplex to make restaurant reservations. By October 2020, Google had expanded Duplex to businesses in eight countries.

==== Criticism ====
After the announcement, concerns were made over the ethical and societal questions that artificial intelligence technology such as Duplex raises. For instance, human operators would not notice that they were speaking with a digital robot when conversing with Duplex, which some critics view as unethical or deceitful. Concerns over privacy were also identified, as conversations with Duplex were recorded in order for the virtual assistant to analyze and respond. Privacy advocates had also raised concerns around how the millions of vocal samples gathered from consumers responded into the algorithms of virtual assistants, making these forms of AI smarter with each use. Although these features individualize the user experience, critics are unsure about the long term implications of giving "the company unprecedented access to human patterns and preferences that are crucial to the next phase of artificial intelligence".

While transparency was known as a key part to the experience when the technology was revealed, Google later further clarified in a statement that they were "designing this feature with disclosure built-in", and that the system would be reviewed to be "appropriately identified." Google further added that, in certain jurisdictions, the assistant would inform those on the other end of the phone that the call was being recorded.

== Reception ==
PC World's Mark Hachman gave a favorable review of the Google Assistant, saying that it was a "step up on Cortana and Siri." Digital Trends called it "smarter than Google Now ever was".

== Criticism ==
In July 2019, Belgian public broadcaster VRT NWS published an article revealing that third-party contractors paid to transcribe audio clips collected by Google Assistant listened to sensitive information about users. Sensitive data collected from Google Home devices and Android phones included names, addresses, and other private conversations after mistaken hot word triggering, such as business calls or bedroom conversations. From more than 1,000 recordings analyzed, 153 were recorded without the "OK Google" command. Google officially acknowledged that 0.2% of recordings were being listened to by language experts to improve Google's services.

On August 1, 2019, Germany's Hamburg Commissioner for Data Protection and Freedom of Information initiated an administrative procedure to prohibit Google from carrying out corresponding evaluations by employees or third parties for the period of three months to provisionally protect the rights of privacy of data subjects for the time being, citing GDPR. A Google spokesperson stated that Google suspended "language reviews" in all European countries while it investigated recent media leaks.

== See also ==
- Amazon Alexa
- Bixby
- Cortana
- Google Gemini
- Home automation (Smart Home)
- Internet of things (IoT)
- Mycroft
- Siri
- Smart devices
- Speech recognition
- Voice user interface
