= Google voice search =

Google voice search may refer to:

- Google Voice Search, a product that allows speech input to Google Search
- Google Voice Local Search, a Google telephone service, 2007–2010

== See also ==
- Google Voice, a telephony service that provides call-forwarding, voicemail, and messaging
