= 1-800-FREE-411 =

American directory assistance service

Marchex
- Type: Public
- Industry: Telecommunications
- Founded: 2005 in Burlington, MA
- Headquarters: Seattle, WA, U.S.
- Key people: Russell C. Horowitz, CEO
- Products: 1-800-FREE411 directory service
- Parent: Liberty Media (9%)
- Website: www.free411.com

1-800-FREE-411 was an American service offering advertising-supported directory assistance, operated by Marchex. While it was operational, it offered service by phone, app, and website.

== Service ==
Callers dialed 1-800 (or 888 or 866)-FREE411 [1-800-373-3411] from any phone in the United States to use the toll-free service. Sponsors covered part of the service cost by playing advertising messages during the call. Callers often heard an ad at the beginning of the call, and then another after they have made their request. Callers then identified the city and state for the desired information, and could then search either by name or by business type.

Free directory assistance was also available from an application for the iPhone and Android mobile phones, and from the company's website. The service, provided entirely by computer and with no human operators, used a voice-recognition database to recognize names or places spoken by the user.

The website stopped accepting new queries in July 2013 and instead mirrored and later simply redirected to the Marchex home page. The domain was listed for sale in November 2024 and as of March 2025 was completely offline while the mobile apps had been removed from the app stores.

The phone number 1-800-FREE-411 (1-800-373-3411) appears to have been acquired by phishing scammers sometime before 2022 as there were reports of people reaching a fake DirecTV support line when calling that number as early as January 2022.

== Corporate overview ==
The original parent corporation, Jingle Networks, was formed in 2005, and received its initial funding from First Round Capital of $400,000. In April 2006, The Wall Street Journal described it as "inspired by the business model of Google". In October 2006, Jingle Networks announced that it raised $30 million in fourth round financing from Goldman Sachs and Hearst Corporation. This came after a $26 million round in April 2006, and a $5 million round in December 2005. Also on that date, Jingle Network's CEO volunteered on TechCrunch that his company was losing on average 5 cents for every call they processed.

By the spring of 2008 the service had, according to TechCrunch, "captured a six percent market share of directory assistance calls." At that time, Jingle Networks received 20 million calls per month. On June 25, 2008, TechCrunch repeated Jingle's press releases that they had reached per-call profitability.By February 2010, the company was reporting fewer calls, around 15 million per month, as consumers shifted to smart-phones to get directory information.

Jingle Networks aimed at attracting customers away from an existing fee-based market. From 2005 through the early 2010, Jingle Networks estimated that they saved consumers $1 billion based on an inflated rate of $2 a call for directory assistance.

In April 2011, Marchex bought Jingle Networks for $62.5M in combination of cash and stock. Marchex said Jingle Networks would generate more than $26 million in 2011 revenue, up more than 40 percent over 2010 and that it expected call-driven revenue to make up 75 percent of the company's 2011 revenue.

== See also ==
- 4-1-1
- 800-THE-INFO (discontinued)
- Bing Mobile § Bing 411 (discontinued)
- GOOG-411 (discontinued)
- List of speech recognition software
- Speech recognition
- Tellme Networks
