= 411 (telephone number) =

North American local directory assistance number

411 is a chargeable abbreviated dialing telephone number for local directory assistance in Canada and the United States. It is an N11 code in the North American Numbering Plan. Although it is commonly used across the US, it is not officially assigned by the Federal Communications Commission.

In the United States, the service is commonly known as "information", although its official name is "directory assistance". Until the early 1980s, 411 – and the related 113 number – was not a free to call company.

== History ==
The 411 number has been in use since at least 1930 in New York City, San Francisco, and other large cities where panel and crossbar switching equipment installed by the Bell System was prevalent. However, in smaller Bell System cities as well as almost all areas served by GTE and other companies where step-by-step equipment was the norm such as Los Angeles, 113 was used until at least the 1960s, and in some cases (the Pacific Northwest, for example) until the mid-1980s.

In Canada and the United States, directory assistance was historically a local function, and most companies updated listings at their directory assistance centers frequently, sometimes daily. When long-distance numbers were needed, prior to the full introduction of direct-dialed long-distance service, callers would call either 411 or 0 (Operator) and request a free long-distance connection to the directory assistance center in the distant city.

In 1962, direct-dialed long-distance directory assistance became available. The number in cities with panel and crossbar switching equipment was [area code]-555-1212, whereas in cities with step-by-step equipment the number was 1-555-1212 (or 112-555-1212) for numbers not local but in the same area code and 1-[area code]-555-1212 (or 112-[area code]-555-1212) for numbers in other area codes. In some area codes, the directory assistance center was able to serve the entire area code, but in many, the operator in the principal city of the area code dialed would connect the caller onward to a more local directory assistance center for the most up-to-date information.

After the introduction of local exchange competition, most telephone companies outsourced directory assistance service to nationwide call centers. This has blurred the distinction between 411 and 555-1212. For regulatory reasons, where telephone service is provided by traditional local-exchange carriers, the local carrier will determine how to handle 411, the chosen local toll (intra-LATA) carrier will determine how to handle 555-1212 calls for area codes within the LATA, and the chosen long-distance carrier for inter-LATA) calls will determine how to handle [other-area-code-555-1212] calls. For service provided by cellular and VoIP carriers where the customer does not have a choice of local toll or long-distance carriers, all calls may be handled the same way.

In North America, all areas formerly using 113 have been converted to using 411, and 11x is now reserved for vertical service codes. Outside North America, "11x" numbers are still in use, for these and other services. In most European countries, 11x numbers are related to emergency services and 112 is the emergency telephone number in the European Union as well as some other European and non-European countries.

== The relationship between 411, 113, and long-distance dialing ==
Direct-distance dialing (DDD) was first introduced in the 1950s in areas using common-control switching systems such as the panel and the crossbar. These areas had used 411 for directory assistance. Because common-control switching could analyse the initial digits of a number in a sender before routing the call, an initial 1 was not required to initiate a long-distance call.

There was no ambiguity in this arrangement because the original assignment of area codes always used either a 0 or a 1 as the second digit. In addition, the second digit of local numbers was never 0 or 1, due to the two-letter plus five-digit local numbering system, in which letters corresponded only to digits 2 to 9 on the dial.

Areas equipped with step-by-step systems processed calls one digit at a time as dialled by the caller. These systems required a common prefix to distinguish long-distance calls from local calls. The Bell System selected 1 for this purpose. However, because 113 was already used for directory assistance, along with other 11x service codes (for example, "Repair" was 114), changes were required in step-by-step areas.

Initially, 112 was used temporarily as the long-distance prefix in most of these areas. To simplify long-distance dialing, it was later standardised to 1. Some areas converted immediately to 411 for directory assistance and 611 for repair service. Other areas retained 113 by installing so-called "double-header" trunks. These trunks routed the call to long-distance equipment and then redirected it if the second digit was also 1.

The conversion in Springfield, Massachusetts, proceeded as follows:

Year	Local D.A.	L.D. Prefix	Long Distance D.A.
1961	113	112	0
1962	411	1	0
1963	411	1	1-555-1212 (within 413); 1-[area code]-555-1212 (other area codes)

== Directory assistance data ==
The services of directory assistance queries is often outsourced to a call center which specializes in the task. Historically, when a single carrier provided most of the telephone services for a region, the data used to satisfy the search could exclusively come for that carrier's subscriber rolls. Today, when the market is fragmented amongst many carriers, the data must be aggregated by a data aggregator specializing in directory listings. The data aggregator distributes the data to the 411 services either on a "live" basis, serving each query on-demand, or by periodically transferring large swaths of listings to the call center's systems for local searching.

The data aggregator collects the data from the rolls of many telecommunication carriers. Some carriers such as Vonage do not send their customer rolls to the aggregator. Their customers can get their listings in the directory assistance database using a free service such as ListYourself.net.

== Landline telephone directory assistance ==
411 landline service has been historically provided by local telephone companies, including those of the former Bell System or subsequent Regional Bell Operating Companies (RBOCs). Telephone carriers since that time may provide the 411 calls to the customer free of charge.

Since the 1984 Bell System divestiture, the RBOCs in the United States have priced 411 use higher to an average of US$1.25 per call, compared to $0.50 CAD in most of Canada, providing opportunities for competing services in the United States, such as ad-sponsored 1-800-FREE-411.

== Wireless telephone directory listings ==
In addition to the local and long-distance directory services, there is also a "Wireless 411 Service". As specified by the industry, the service will give wireless subscribers the choice of including their wireless phone numbers in directory assistance services.

Consumers can opt in to listing their name and cellphone number with directory assistance services, such as 411. The information is currently not published in print or online directories. Additionally, the information is not added to, or otherwise shared with, marketing lists or telemarketing firms.

The service will allow any landline or wireless phone user to call 411 and be connected to the wireless listing of a subscriber who has chosen to participate in the service. Carriers who make up the industry LLC creating the service include Alltel (now absorbed by Verizon Wireless), AT&T, T-Mobile, and Sprint Nextel (now absorbed by T-Mobile).

== Withdrawal of 411 services ==
In the United States cellular market, AT&T announced its withdrawal of 411 service for its wireless phone customers, effective November 1, 2022. AT&T also announced it would discontinue landline 411 services in 21 states starting January 1, 2023.

== See also ==
- 911 (emergency telephone number)
- 800-The-Info
- Bing 411
- City directory
- GOOG-411
- N11 Code
- North American Numbering Plan
- People search site
- Reverse lookup
- Reverse telephone directory
- information search behavior
- Speech recognition
- Telephone directory (aka a "phone book")
- Tellme Networks
- Yellow pages
- Web directory
