= Prakash Puram =

Prakash Puram (born 1954) is the former president and CEO of the former small business iXmatch, and a former member of former president Bush's Export Council.

== Biography ==
=== Education ===
He received a Bachelor of Science degree from Loyola College, Chennai, India; a Business Management diploma from Xavier Labour Relations Institute, Jamshedpur, India; an MBA from the University of Minnesota; and a Master of Public Administration from Harvard University. Prakash serves on the advisory board of the University of Minnesota’s Carlson School of Management Center for Entrepreneurial Studies.

=== Career ===
Puram has had leadership and product management roles at Net Perceptions, Honeywell, IBM, Pillsbury, and Unilever.

On September 22, 2006 U.S. President George W. Bush nominated Puram to be a member of the President's Export Council. Following a breakfast with Federal Reserve Bank Chairman Alan Greenspan, Puram and other new members were sworn in on December 6, 2005 by U.S. Commerce Secretary Carlos Gutierrez who administered the oath of Office. White House Chief of Staff, Andrew H. Card, Jr., attended the swearing-in ceremony, representing the President.
