= Darby Bailey =

American actress

- Born: Salt Lake City, Utah, US
- Other names: Darby, Darby McDonough
- Occupation: Voice actor
- Years active: 1999–present
- Known for: Voice of Tellme, Amex, Verizon and AT&T 4-1-1

Darby Bailey is an American actress and voice-over artist. She is most known as the "Voice of Tellme" and the voice of Verizon and AT&T's 4-1-1 Directory Assistance. Her voice has been heard trillions of times by telephone callers in the U.S. since she first started voicing phone systems in 1999.

== Career ==
While most known for being the 'Voice of Tellme' and Verizon and AT&T's 4-1-1, she is also the entry voice to various interactive voice response (IVR) systems for American Express, Fidelity Investments, United Parcel Service and inside Ford Sync enabled automobiles. She also voiced Utah's 511 Travel Line to coincide with the 2002 Winter Olympics. Her voice has been heard billions of times in the United States by callers using Tellme built systems. She is known for her "winsome" voice as described by one journalist.

== In popular culture ==
On October 8, 2005, in a Saturday Night Live sketch called 'Julie The Operator Lady' her voice was parodied, as she was at the time, voicing a broad number of phone services, including being the first voice actor to voice both the 1-800-FANDANGO movie phone ticketing system and the Orbitz Travel alert systems, as well as the first voice interactive version of the AT&T, 1-800-555-1212, Directory Assistance line

Darby appeared as herself in a 2003 television episode of CBS news program Sunday Morning where she was interviewed by David Pogue for her work voicing speech enabled telephone systems.
