= GOOG-411 =

Phone directory search service by Google

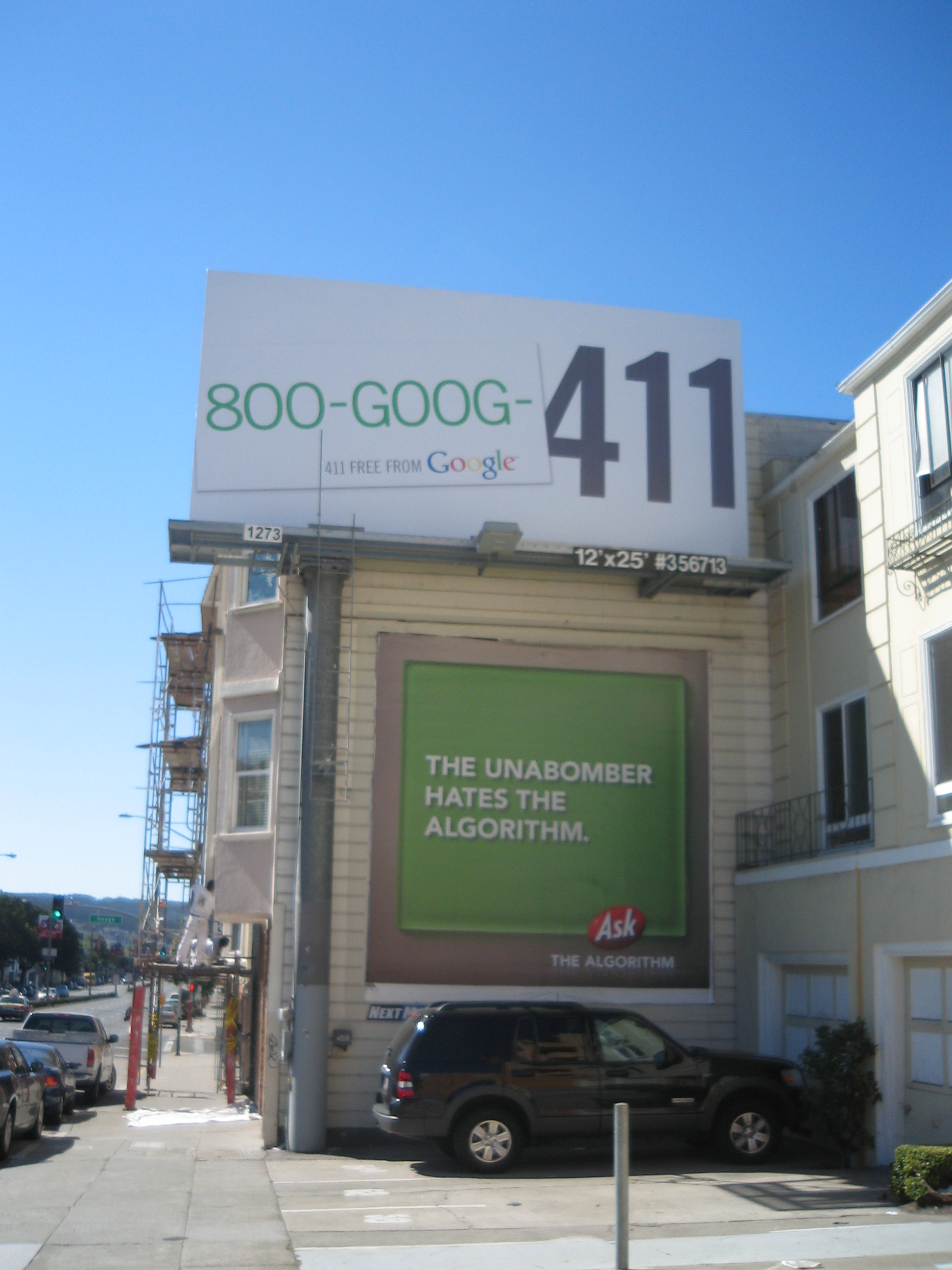
- Website type: Search
- Available in: English
- Dissolved: November 12, 2010; 15 years ago
- Owner: Google
- Creator: Google
- Website: google.com/goog411
- Registration: No
- Launched: April 6, 2007; 19 years ago
- Current status: Discontinued

GOOG-411 (or Google Voice Local Search) was a telephone service launched by Google in 2007, that provided a speech-recognition-based business directory search, and placed a call to the resulting number in the United States or Canada. The service was accessible via a toll-free telephone number. It was an alternative to 4-1-1, an often-expensive service provided by local and long-distance phone companies, and was therefore commonly known as Google 411. This service was discontinued on November 12, 2010.

== History ==
GOOG-411 had been assisting people with obtaining phone numbers since 2007. On November 12, 2010, GOOG-411 shut down its service. While Google did not provide an official reason for the shut down, many believe that Google had simply gathered enough voice samples for its research purposes. Google also operated a similar service from SMS number 466453 which has also been discontinued.

== Operations ==
Users who called the toll-free telephone numbers 800-466-4411 or 877-466-4411 (800-GOOG-411 and 877-GOOG-411) or the local number 425-296-4774 were asked for the city and state of the sought business. Users were also able to search for by business name or category, which generated a list of up to eight search results. Search was also invoked by using the keypad if the user preferred. This worked in a similar manner to predictive text input on a cellular phone. Users were able to select the destination by speaking or pressing the number that corresponded to the desired result. Once the destination was selected, the service placed a call to the business or returned a text message with the phone number. Alternatively, users were able to listen to the street address and phone number by saying "details". U.S. users could narrow search results by ZIP code or street intersection.

Although Google's FAQ stated that users were able to prevent their phone number from being saved by blocking their caller ID, this was ineffective when calling the 800 number (due to ANI) and only worked when calling the other two. The service would announced to the caller that the call could be recorded for the purpose of service improvements.

Google advised users not to use the service for emergency calls, recommending instead that they call 9-1-1.

== Business model ==
Google stated that the company originally implemented GOOG-411 to build a large phoneme database from users' voice queries. This phoneme database, in turn, allowed Google engineers to refine and improve the speech recognition engine that Google uses to index audio content for searching.

== See also ==
- 1-800-FREE-411
- 800-The-Info
- Bing Mobile
- List of speech recognition software
- Tellme Networks
