= Sensemaking (information science) =

Process and methodology in information science

While sensemaking has been studied by other disciplines under other names for centuries, in information science and computer science the term "sensemaking" has primarily marked two distinct but related topics. Sensemaking was introduced as a methodology by Brenda Dervin in the 1980s and to human–computer interaction by PARC researchers Daniel M. Russell, Mark Stefik, Peter Pirolli, and Stuart Card in 1993.

In information science, the term is often written as "sense-making". In both cases, the concept has been used to bring together insights drawn from philosophy, sociology, and cognitive science (especially social psychology). Sensemaking research is therefore often presented as an interdisciplinary research programme.

== As a process ==
Given a body of data, sensemaking can be described as the process of developing a representation and encoding data in that representation to answer questions specific to a task, such as decision-making and problem-solving (Russell et al., 1993). Gary A. Klein and colleagues (Klein et al. 2006b) conceptualize sensemaking as a set of processes that is initiated when an individual or organization recognizes the inadequacy of their current understanding of events.

Sensemaking is an active two-way process of fitting data into a frame (mental model) and fitting a frame around the data. Neither data nor frame comes first; data evoke frames and frames select and connect data. When there is no adequate fit, the data may be reconsidered or an existing frame may be revised. This description resembles the recognition-metacognition model (Cohen et al., 1996), which describes the metacognitive processes that are used by individuals to build, verify, and modify working models (or "stories") in situational awareness to account for an unrecognised situation. Such notions also echo the processes of assimilation and accommodation in Jean Piaget's theory of cognitive development (e.g., Piaget, 1972, 1977).

== As methodology ==
Brenda Dervin (Dervin, 1983, 1992, 1996) has investigated individual sensemaking, developing theories about the "cognitive gap" that individuals experience when attempting to make sense of observed data. Because much of this applied psychological research is grounded within the context of systems engineering and human factors, it aims to answer the need for concepts and performance to be measurable and for theories to be testable. Accordingly, sensemaking and situational awareness are viewed as working concepts that enable researchers to investigate and improve the interaction between people and information technology. This perspective emphasizes that humans play a significant role in adapting and responding to unexpected or unknown situations, as well as recognized situations. Dervin's work has largely focused on developing philosophical guidance for method, including methods of substantive theorizing and conducting research (Naumer, C. et al., 2008).

== In human–computer interaction ==
After a seminal paper on sensemaking in the human–computer interaction (HCI) field was published in 1993 (Russell et al., 1993), there was a great deal of activity around the understanding of how to design interactive systems for sensemaking, and workshops on sensemaking were held at prominent HCI conferences (e.g., Russell et al., 2009).

== See also ==
- Augmented cognition

== References (information science) ==
- Dervin, B. (1983). An overview of sense-making research: Concepts, methods and results. Paper presented at the annual meeting of the International Communication Association. Dallas, TX.
- Dervin, B. (1992). From the mind's eye of the user: The sense-making qualitative-quantitative methodology. In Glazier, J. and Powell, R. R. Qualitative research in information management (p. 61-84). Englewood, CA: Libraries Unlimited
- Dervin, B. (1996). Given a context by any other name:Methodological tools for taming the unruly beast. Keynote paper, ISIC 96: Information Seeking in Context. 1–23.
- Klein, G., Moon, B. and Hoffman, R.F. (2006a). Making sense of sensemaking I: alternative perspectives. IEEE Intelligent Systems, 21(4), 70–73.
- Klein, G., Moon, B. and Hoffman, R.F. (2006b). Making sense of sensemaking II: a macrocognitive model. IEEE Intelligent Systems, 21(5), 88–92.
- Naumer, C., Fisher, K., & Dervin, B. (2008). Sense-making: a methodological perspective. In Sensemaking Workshop, CHI'08.
- Piaget, J. (1972). To Understand Is To Invent. New York: The Viking Press, Inc.
- Piaget, J. (1977). The Development of Thought: Equilibration of Cognitive Structures. (A. Rosen, Trans.) New York: Viking
- Russell, D. M., Pirolli, P., Furnas, G., Card, S. K., & Stefik, M. (2009). Sensemaking workshop CHI 2009. In CHI'09 Extended Abstracts on Human Factors in Computing Systems (pp. 4751–4754). New York: ACM.
- Russell, D. M., Stefik, M. J., Pirolli, P., & Card, S. K. (1993). The cost structure of sensemaking. In Proceedings of the INTERACT'93 and CHI'93 conference on Human Factors in Computing Systems (pp. 269–276). New York: ACM. doi:10.1145/169059.169209
