= Bing Vision =

- Developer: Microsoft
- Operating system: Windows Phone (7.5+)
- Website: www.bing.com/blogs/site_blogs/b/search/archive/2011/10/10/windows-phone-update-bing-o-on-mango.aspx

Bing Vision is an image recognition application created by Microsoft which is installed on Windows Phones running version 7.5 and above, including Windows Phone 8. It is a part of the Bing Mobile suite of services, and on most devices can be accessed using the search button. On Windows Phone 8.1 devices where Microsoft Cortana is available, it is only available through the lenses of the Camera app (as the search button now activates Cortana). Bing Vision can scan barcodes, QR codes, Microsoft Tags, books, CDs, and DVDs. Books, CDs, and DVDs are offered through Bing Shopping.

== See also ==
- Nokia Point & Find
- Google Goggles
