= Distance education librarian =

Type of specialized academic librarian

A distance education librarian or distance learning librarian is a specialized academic librarian whose primary duties involve serving the information needs of distance education students, faculty, and staff. This position typically involves coordinating the duties of many librarians and library staff to ensure adequate access to library resources for those who enroll in and teach distance education courses.

== History ==
Recognizing that distance education offerings were growing in post-secondary educational institutions, the Association of College and Research Libraries (ACRL) published "Guidelines for Distance Learning Libraries in 2000". These guidelines asserted that, "members of the distance learning community are entitled to library resources equivalent to those provided for students and faculty in traditional campus settings". July 1, 2008, the ACRL Board of Directors approved the "Standards for Distance Learning Library Services".

The Standards are divided into two parts. Part I, Foundations, provides an executive summary of the Access Entitlement Principle, outlines the parameters by which the Standards will serve as a living document, offers definitions of terms associated with both distance education and academic librarianship, and formalizes the Standards' philosophy as "A Bill of Rights for the Distance Learning Community". Part II, Specific Requirements, dictates the fiscal responsibilities, personnel, library education, management, facilities and equipment, resources, services, and documentation necessary for each institution to provide equivalent services to distance education students and faculty.

Traditionally, academic librarians provide reference services to students, faculty, and staff; support curriculum and instruction through collection building and management of information resources; and provide bibliographic support and instruction to increase information literacy among patrons. Most institutions were already providing support to distance education students, faculty, and staff. The ACRL's "Standards for Distance Learning Library Services" made it necessary to formalize the function, roles, and duties of academic librarians who support distance education students and led to the creation of the job title distance education librarian.

== Roles and duties ==
Distance education (DE) librarians work to ensure that distance education students and faculty have the same access as on-campus students to essential services including: reference assistance, library materials, bibliographic instruction, interlibrary loan and document delivery, and access to reserve materials. There are duties specific to DE Librarians as well. Distance education (DE) librarians serve as primary contacts at the library for distance education students and faculty. DE librarians may provide technical support or reference service over the phone, using instant messaging, replying to emails and reference service request forms, or through videoconferencing . DE librarians also design, maintain, and assess library DE web-pages and user interfaces. DE websites generally provide general information to DE students such as how to obtain a library card, and hours of operation for reference services. DE librarians also create specialized online tutorials covering topics such as information literacy education and using of remotely accessible library databases. DE librarians also assist faculty with designing course-specific web-pages and provide copyright advisement.

The ACRL acknowledges that distance education library service delivery methods will vary from institution to institution, but should be developed using the same professional standards and guidelines used by other academic libraries.
