= Flipboard =

News aggregator and social network aggregation company

- Developers: Mike McCue and Evan Doll
- Release: July 21, 2010; 16 years ago

Stable release(s)
- Android: 4.2.105 / August 17, 2022; 4 years ago
- iOS: 4.2.154 / August 22, 2022; 4 years ago
- Operating system: iOS, Android, Tizen, watchOS, Fitbit OS, Windows, Windows Phone
- Size: 19.4 MB (Android); 124 MB (iOS)
- Type: Social network aggregation
- License: Proprietary
- Website: flipboard.com

Flipboard is a news aggregator and social network aggregation company based in Palo Alto, California, with offices in New York, Vancouver, and Beijing. Its software, also known as Flipboard, was first released in July 2010. It aggregates content from social media, news feeds, photo sharing sites, and other websites, presents it in magazine format, and allows users to "flip" through the articles, images, and videos being shared. Readers can also save stories into Flipboard magazines. As of March 2016 the company claims there have been 28 million magazines created by users on Flipboard. The service can be accessed via web browser, or by a Flipboard application for Microsoft Windows and macOS, and via mobile apps for iOS and Android. The client software is available at no charge and is localized in 21 languages.

== History ==
The original launch of Flipboard in 2010 was exclusively for iPad. It launched the iPhone and iPod Touch versions seventeen months later in December 2011.

The company raised more than $200 million in funding from investors, and an additional $50 million from JPMorgan Chase in July 2015.

Original Flipboard logo, in use until 2018

On May 5, 2012, Flipboard was released for Android phones, beginning with the Samsung Galaxy S3. On May 30, 2012, a beta version of Flipboard for Android was released through its website. A final stable release of the Flipboard for Android was released on June 22, 2012, in Google Play. The Windows 8 version of the Flipboard app was also demonstrated during the Microsoft 2013 Build Conference and on the Flipboard blog with a video, although no release date was given. On October 22, 2014, Flipboard for Windows 8 was rolled out to Windows Phone devices starting with the Nokia Lumia 2520.

In March 2014, Flipboard bought Zite, a magazine-style reading app, from the CNN television network. Flipboard's content filtering, topic engine and recommendations system were integrated from this acquisition. Zite was shut down on December 7, 2015.

In February 2015, Flipboard became available on the web. Up until then, Flipboard was a mobile app, only available on tablets and mobile phones. The web client provides webpage links on desktop browsers, and lacks some features of the client software.

In February 2017, Flipboard updated their mobile apps for iOS and Android to 4.0, which brought a full redesign to the application, and implemented new features such as smart magazines, which allow users to bundle different things together, such as various news sources, people, and hashtags.

On May 29, 2019, Flipboard disclosed a security breach that affected an unspecified number of users between June 2, 2018, and March 23, 2019, and April 21 and 22, 2019, where customer databases including information, such as encrypted passwords and access tokens for third-party services, were accessible to an unauthorized party. All passwords and authentication tokens for third-party services are being reset, although Flipboard noted that almost all passwords were hashed using the strong bcrypt algorithm (except for some using the insecure and obsolete SHA-1 algorithm, replaced by the service in 2012), and there was no evidence that the access to tokens was abused.

In September 2021, Flipboard introduced a new personalisation feature to allow users to customise their For You page. When users open the app, they will see a "tune" icon where they can select topics they are interested in. This feature was added to combat doomscrolling and allow users to have greater control of what they see.

In December 2023, Flipboard began a phased process of integrating with the Fediverse, using the ActivityPub protocol.

In December 2024, Flipboard launched the Surf browser, an RSS feed reader and client for the Social Web, with initial support for the AT Protocol (used primarily by Bluesky) and ActivityPub (used primarily by Mastodon) protocols.

Flipboard rolled out its latest iOS update 4.3.44 on Apr 2, 2025.

== Reception ==
The reaction to the application was mainly positive, with Techpad calling it a "killer" iPad application. Time magazine named it one of the 50 best inventions of 2010. Apple reviewed Flipboard positively, and named the application Apple's "iPad App of the Year" in 2010. When a new update of the software added more features such as support for Google Reader, a web-based aggregator, and content from more publishers, the app received a favorable review from the Houston Chronicle.

== Censorship ==
On May 15, 2011, Flipboard was blocked by the Great Firewall of China. McCue said on his Twitter feed – "China has now officially blocked Flipboard."

The company then released its first edition localized for China. Beginning in February 2015, the company started self-censoring users using the application from China. The content guide for China does not include Twitter and Facebook anymore. Existing subscriptions for Twitter or Facebook are also automatically removed.

== User interface ==
The application's user interface is designed for intuitive flipping through content. Once the feeds have been set up, the first page seen when the application is opened is a list of the subscribed content. The iPhone and Android versions have a "Cover Stories" section on the first page collating only the most recent, important items from all of the subscriptions. This is meant to be read when the user only has a short period of time for reading.

== See also ==
- Comparison of feed aggregators
- List of most-downloaded Google Play applications
