= Information seeking =

Type of activity in information science

Information seeking is the process or activity of attempting to obtain information in both human and technological contexts. Information seeking is related to, but different from, information retrieval (IR).

== Compared to information retrieval ==
Traditionally, IR tools have been designed for IR professionals to enable them to effectively and efficiently retrieve information from a source. It is assumed that the information exists in the source and that a well-formed query will retrieve it (and nothing else). It has been argued that laypersons' information seeking on the internet is very different from information retrieval as performed within the IR discourse. Yet, internet search engines are built on IR principles. Since the late 1990s a body of research on how casual users interact with internet search engines has been forming, but the topic is far from fully understood. IR can be said to be technology-oriented, focusing on algorithms and issues such as precision and recall. Information seeking may be understood as a more human-oriented and open-ended process than information retrieval. In information seeking, one does not know whether there exists an answer to one's query, so the process of seeking may provide the learning required to satisfy one's information need.

== In different contexts ==
Much library and information science (LIS) research has focused on the information-seeking practices of practitioners within various fields of professional work. Studies have been carried out into the information-seeking behaviors of librarians, academics, medical professionals, engineers, lawyers and mini-publics(among others). Much of this research has drawn on the work done by Leckie, Pettigrew (now Fisher) and Sylvain, who in 1996 conducted an extensive review of the LIS literature (as well as the literature of other academic fields) on professionals' information seeking. The authors proposed an analytic model of professionals' information seeking behaviour, intended to be generalizable across the professions, thus providing a platform for future research in the area. The model was intended to "prompt new insights... and give rise to more refined and applicable theories of information seeking" (1996, p. 188). The model has been adapted by Wilkinson (2001) who proposes a model of the information seeking of lawyers. Recent studies in this topic address the concept of information-gathering that "provides a broader perspective that adheres better to professionals' work-related reality and desired skills." (Solomon & Bronstein, 2021).

== Theories of information-seeking behavior ==
A variety of theories of information behavior – e.g. Zipf's Principle of Least Effort, Brenda Dervin's Sense Making, Elfreda Chatman's Life in the Round – seek to understand the processes that surround information seeking. In addition, many theories from other disciplines have been applied in investigating an aspect or whole process of information seeking behavior.

A review of the literature on information seeking behavior shows that information seeking has generally been accepted as dynamic and non-linear (Foster, 2005; Kuhlthau 2006). People experience the information search process as an interplay of thoughts, feelings and actions (Kuhlthau, 2006). Donald O. Case (2007) also wrote a good book that is a review of the literature.

Information seeking has been found to be linked to a variety of interpersonal communication behaviors beyond question-asking, to include strategies such as candidate answers.

Robinson's (2010) research suggests that when seeking information at work, people rely on both other people and information repositories (e.g., documents and databases), and spend similar amounts of time consulting each (7.8% and 6.4% of work time, respectively; 14.2% in total). However, the distribution of time among the constituent information seeking stages differs depending on the source. When consulting other people, people spend less time locating the information source and information within that source, similar time understanding the information, and more time problem solving and decision making, than when consulting information repositories. Furthermore, the research found that people spend substantially more time receiving information passively (i.e., information that they have not requested) than actively (i.e., information that they have requested), and this pattern is also reflected when they provide others with information.

== Wilson's nested model of conceptual areas ==
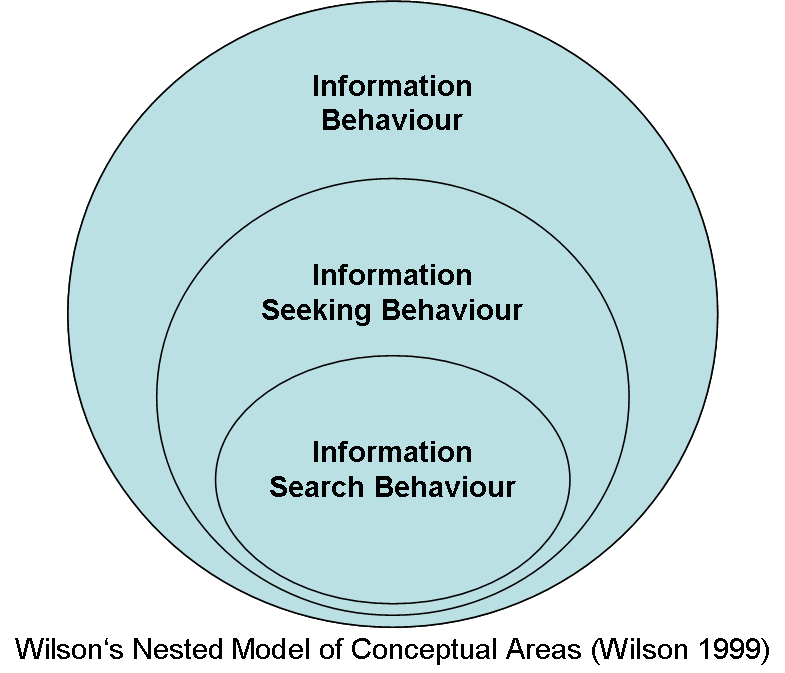
Wilson's Nested Model of Conceptual Areas

The concepts of information seeking, information retrieval, and information behaviour are objects of investigation of information science. Within this scientific discipline a variety of studies has been undertaken analyzing the interaction of an individual with information sources in case of a specific information need, task, and context. The research models developed in these studies vary in their level of scope. Wilson (1999) therefore developed a nested model of conceptual areas, which visualizes the interrelation of the here mentioned central concepts.

Wilson defines models of information behavior to be "statements, often in the form of diagrams, that attempt to describe an information-seeking activity, the causes and consequences of that activity, or the relationships among stages in information-seeking behaviour" (1999: 250).

== Artificial Intelligence and Information Seeking ==
The emergence of conversational artificial intelligence systems - large language models like ChatGPT and Claude - has resulted in a broader reconsideration of existing models of information seeking. Unlike with traditional search engines (i.e., Google), which returns a ranked list of sources based on keyword queries that users can then review and select relevant information, conversational agents generate synthesized natural-language answers, allowing users to express information needs conversationally. Researchers have argued that this shifts information seeking away from the query-and-browse type interaction assumed in much of existing information retrieval research toward an interactive and dialogic process, with some users switching from search engines to generative AI tools for everyday information needs.

Scholars have raised concerns about the implications of this shift for information behavior. Because generative AI systems provide answers directly rather than directing users to underlying sources, these users may have difficulty evaluating the provenance and reliability of information, and these systems can produce plausible-sounding but ultimately inaccurate content.

== See also ==
- Browse
- Collaborative information seeking
- Information foraging
- Onboarding
- Social information seeking
