= 247.ai =

Customer experience software and services company

[24]7.ai, Inc.
- Formerly: 24/7 Customer, Inc.
- Type: Private
- Industry: Software and Services
- Founded: April 2000; 26 years ago
- Founders: P.V. Kannan; Shanmugam Nagarajan
- Headquarters: San Jose, California
- Number of employees: 15,000
- Website: www.247.ai

[24]7.ai (full company name [24]7.ai, Inc.) is a customer service software and services company based in California that uses artificial intelligence and machine learning to provide targeted customer service.

== History ==
[24]7.ai was founded in April 2000 by P. V. Kannan and Shanmugam Nagarajan. Kannan had previously founded Continuum Global Solutions, a software company, which was later acquired by Kana Software in 1999.

In 2003, [24]7.ai was privately funded in part by Michael Moritz and his venture capital firm Sequoia Capital. The total venture funding was estimated at $22 million. The company was profitable by the end of 2003.

In February 2012 a deal was announced in which [24]7.ai and Microsoft would combine technologies for natural user interfaces (NUIs) and data analytics at cloud scale. Microsoft made an equity investor and transferred approximately 400 employees of the former Tellme Networks to [24]7.ai. At the same time, [24]7.ai acquired the call center automation developer Voxify, which had been based in Alameda, California, and was funded by investors such as Intel. In 2012, the company rebranded its business, adopting a new logo dropping the word "Customer" and putting square brackets around the "24". In January 2013 it announced it would market some internally developed software products for combining chat with analytics.

In May 2013 the company announced the acquisition of social commerce firm Shopalize for an undisclosed amount of money. [24]7.ai was also listed on Forbes list of America's Most Promising Companies in 2013.

In November 2014, [24]7.ai acquired IntelliResponse, a provider of digital self-service technology, including virtual agent solutions.

In August 2015, [24]7.ai acquired Campanja, a Search Engine bidding platform with offices in Stockholm, London, Palo Alto, Chicago and New York, adding real-time marketing capability to the [24]7.ai offering.

In July 2015, the company announced it had become "the world's largest provider of chat agents, with more than 5,000 dedicated chat agents operating in its contact centers."

In October 2017, the company announced a name change, adding .ai to reflect the company's use of artificial intelligence.

== Corporate affairs ==
=== Structure ===
The company is headquartered in San Jose, California. Other offices are located in Toronto, London, and Sydney. [24]7.ai has customers in many industries, including agencies, education, financial services, healthcare, insurance, retail & e-commerce, telecom, travel and hospitality, and utilities.

The company's contact centers were originally located in Bangalore and Hyderabad, India, and in the Philippines. In 2007 (at about 7,000 total employees) the company expanded to Guatemala, Nicaragua, and Colombia to support Spanish-speaking customers.

=== Acquisitions ===
- 2015: Campanja, a Search Engine bidding platform
- 2014: IntelliResponse, a provider of digital self-service technology, including virtual agent solutions
- 2013: Shopalize, social commerce firm
- 2012: Voxify, call center automation developer

== Products and services ==
[24]7.ai offers sales and service-oriented software that provides services such as predictive analytics, and virtual agents. It integrates different channels of communication, including web chat, mobile devices and interactive voice response, which incorporates the company's proprietary language technology.

The company operates contact centers that outsource voice and chat agent services, for sales and support. The main demands are in telecommunications, financial services, retail, insurance, and travel industries. Its early offerings were contact center services with voice contact center agents.

== Controversies ==
The company is reported to have monitored remote working employees via their web cameras. When the story came out, Klarna, a customer, required the practice to be stopped for any [24]7.ai employee working on their cases.

On August 8, 2019 the company was sued by its client Delta Air Lines over a 2017 data breach. Delta alleges that 800,000 of its customer's credit card data was stolen due to a series of failures at 24/7 including "allowing numerous employees to utilize the same login credentials; did not limit access to the source code running the [24/7] chat function to only those individuals who had a clear need to access that code; did not require the use of passwords that met PCI DSS...standards; did not have sufficient automatic expiration dates for login credentials and passwords...; and did not require users to pass multi-factor authentication prior to being granted access to sensitive source code."

Delta also alleges that the breach was discovered by 24/7 in September or October 2017 and did not notify Delta of the incident until 5 months later through LinkedIn messages to some Delta employees. The Complaint alleges that 24/7 still has not provided "formal detailed notice" of the incident despite 24/7 sending security conformance documents to Delta in February 2018 when it knew that the security incident had occurred. It is alleged that 24/7 hid the breach from Delta until the renewal of its contract was signed.

== Recognitions ==
- 2013:America's Most Promising Companies 2013 (Forbes)
