= Information foraging =

Theory of human search behavior

Information foraging is a theory that applies the ideas from optimal foraging theory to understand how human users search for information. The theory is based on the assumption that, when searching for information, humans use "built-in" foraging mechanisms that evolved to help our animal ancestors find food. Importantly, a better understanding of human search behavior can improve the usability of websites or any other user interface.

== History of the theory ==
In the 1970s optimal foraging theory was developed by anthropologists and ecologists to explain how animals hunt for food. It suggested that the eating habits of animals revolve around maximizing energy intake over a given amount of time. For every predator, certain prey is worth pursuing, while others would result in a net loss of energy.

In the early 1990s, Peter Pirolli and Stuart Card from PARC noticed the similarities between users' information searching patterns and animal food foraging strategies. Working together with psychologists to analyze users' actions and the information landscape that they navigated (links, descriptions, and other data), they showed that information seekers use the same strategies as food foragers.

In the late 1990s, Ed H. Chi worked with Pirolli, Card, and others at PARC to further develop information scent ideas and algorithms to actually use these concepts in real interactive systems, including the modeling of web user browsing behavior, the inference of information needs from web visit log files, and the use of information scent concepts in reading and browsing interfaces.

== Details of the theory ==
"Informavores" constantly make decisions on what kind of information to look for, whether to stay at the current site to try to find additional information or whether they should move on to another site, which path or link to follow to the next information site, and when to finally stop the search. Although human cognition is not a result of evolutionary pressure to improve Web use, survival-related traits to respond quickly on partial information and reduce energy expenditures force them to optimize their searching behavior and, simultaneously, to minimize the thinking required.

=== Information scent ===
The most important concept in the information foraging theory is information scent. As animals rely on scents to indicate the chances of finding prey in current area and guide them to other promising patches, so do humans rely on various cues in the information environment to get similar answers. Human users estimate how much useful information they are likely to get on a given path, and after seeking information compare the actual outcome with their predictions. When the information scent stops getting stronger (i.e., when users no longer expect to find useful additional information), the users move to a different information source.

=== Information diet ===
Some tendencies in the behaviour of web users are easily understood from the information foraging theory standpoint. On the Web, each site is a patch and information is the prey. Leaving a site is easy, but finding good sites has not always been as easy. Advanced search engines have changed this fact by reliably providing relevant links, altering the foraging strategies of the users. When users expect that sites with lots of information are easy to find, they have less incentive to stay in one place. The growing availability of broadband connections may have a similar effect: always-on connections encourage this behavior, short online visits to get specific answers.

=== Models ===
Attempts have been made to develop computational cognitive models to characterize information foraging behavior on the Web. These models assume that users perceive relevance of information based on some measures of information scent, which are usually derived based on statistical techniques that extract semantic relatedness of words from large text databases. Recently these information foraging models have been extended to explain social information behavior. See also models of collaborative tagging.

== Sources ==
- Information Foraging: Why Google Makes People Leave Your Site Faster by Jakob Nielsen, June 30, 2003, Alertbox.
- High-tech quest for a user-friendly Web, June 2, 2002, USA Today.
- Word Spy – information foraging, December 19, 2002.
