= Patrick Wilson (librarian) =

American librarian, administrator, and philosophy professor

- Born: December 29, 1927; Santa Cruz, California
- Died: September 12, 2003 (aged 75); San Francisco, California
- Occupations: Librarian, Information science professor

Academic background
- Education: University of California, Berkeley (A.B. 1949, B.L.S. 1953, Ph.D. 1960)
- Thesis: On Interpretation and Understanding (1960)
- Doctoral advisor: Benson Mates

Academic work
- Discipline: Library and information science
- Institutions: University of California, Los Angeles; UC Berkeley School of Library and Information Studies
- Doctoral students: Elfreda Chatman; Howard D. White

Patrick Wilson (December 29, 1927 – September 12, 2003) was a noted librarian, information scientist and philosopher who served as a professor at the University of California, Berkeley and as dean of the School of Library and Information Studies (now the School of Information) there. Earlier in his career, Wilson taught philosophy at the University of California, Los Angeles.

== Career ==
Wilson is noted within the library and information science communities for his work on the philosophical underpinnings of bibliographic control, that is, the ways in which knowledge is organized and the relationships between different documents and pieces of knowledge. He also did work on what he called "cognitive authority," which is the study of how people gain reputation and the authority of possessing knowledge in the eyes of other people.

He is the subject of an oral history.

Wilson was the winner of the 2001 American Society for Information Science and Technology Award of Merit. In his acceptance remarks, Wilson commented:

So for me information science and technology has been a fascinating combination of engineering, an odd kind of materials science and social epistemology. Social epistemology with a focus on textual objects and with an eye on the actual and possible roles of information systems is a productive approach to our field. There is a huge and rich supply of real problems out there still awaiting exploration, of real importance and endless fascination, and I urge others to take them on.

== Published works ==
Wilson is the author of three books:

- Wilson, Patrick (1968). Two Kinds of Power: An Essay on Bibliographical Control. University of California Press. p. 155. ISBN 978-0-520-03515-7.
- Wilson, Patrick (1977). Public Knowledge, Private Ignorance: Toward a Library and Information Policy. Greenwood Publishing Group. p. 156. ISBN 978-0-8371-9485-1.
- Wilson, Patrick (1983). Second-Hand Knowledge: An Inquiry into Cognitive Authority. Greenwood Publishing Group. p. 210. ISBN 978-0-313-23763-8.

== See also ==
- Subject (documents)
