= Reverse lookup =

Type of information search procedure

Reverse lookup is a procedure of using a value to retrieve a unique key in an associative array.

Applications of reverse lookup include

- reverse DNS lookup, which provides the domain name associated with a particular IP address,
- reverse telephone directory, which provides the name of the entity associated with a particular telephone number,
- reverse image search, which provides similar images to the one provided.

== See also ==
- Inverse function
- Reverse dictionary
