= Elfreda Chatman =

American academic librarian

- Born: 1942; Youngstown, Ohio
- Died: January 15, 2002 (aged 59–60); Tallahassee, Florida
- Occupation: Information science professor

Academic background
- Education: Youngstown State University (B.S., 1971); Case Western Reserve University (M.S., 1976); University of California, Berkeley (Ph.D., 1983)
- Thesis: The Diffusion of Information among the Working Poor (1983)
- Doctoral advisor: Patrick Wilson

Academic work
- Discipline: Library and information science
- Institutions: Louisiana State University; UNC School of Information and Library Science; Florida State University School of Library & Information Studies

Elfreda Annmary Chatman (1942–2002) was an African-American researcher, professor, and former Catholic religious sister. She was well known for her ethnographic approaches in researching information seeking behaviors among understudied or minority groups (poor people, the elderly, retired women, female inmates, and janitors).

== Contributions ==
Chatman's research resulted in several middle-range theories: information poverty, life in the round, and normative behavior. Based on her background in sociology, she developed her "small worlds" method of studying information behavior.

=== Life in the round ===
This theory draws on Chatman's study of female prisoners at a maximum-security prison in the northeastern United States. After observing inmates both during and outside of their interactions with the prison's professional employees, Chatman theorizes that the women live "in the round," that is, "within an acceptable degree of approximation and imprecision." Instead of seeking information about the outside world, over which they have no control, prisoners avoid gathering this type of information; in order to survive, they place importance on "daily living patterns, relationships, and issues that come within the prison environment" over which they can exercise agency. In this way, inmates display defensive information seeking behavior.

Inmates form a "small world," a closed community where private opinion yields to a shared reality its accompanying information-seeking behavior. Social norms established by inmates determine the importance or triviality of a piece of information; as such, information that affects prisoners in an immediate way (such as illness while medical staff are off-duty) gain importance, while information about the outside world becomes trivial. Chatman concludes that life in the round disfavors information seeking behavior, as there is no need to search for outside information. Prisoners "are not part of the world [...] being defined by outsiders" and because inmates do not need additional information to participate fully in their own reality, they do not seek it out.

Chatman saw that these disincentives to information seeking could become cultural norms in small worlds, and that these cultural norms could produce what she labeled information poverty, by perpetuating the avoidance of information that would be useful.

== Biography ==
Chatman received her BS from Youngstown State University, her MSLS from Case Western Reserve University, and her PhD from the University of California, Berkeley. She was also at one point a member of the Sisters of the Humility of Mary based in Ohio.

Her 1992 book The Information World of Retired Women won the ACRL Best Book Award in 1995. Chatman participated in the American Library Association's Library Research Round Table during the 1980s and 1990s, and served as its chair in 1993 to 1994.

Chatman was a professor at the Louisiana State University School of Library and Information Science from 1984 to 1985, then for over a decade at the UNC School of Information and Library Science, starting in 1985, and a research award there is named for her.

She was teaching at the School of Information Studies at Florida State University at the time of her death on January 15, 2002, at the age of 59.

== Legacy ==
An Association for Information Science and Technology Special Interest Group named a research award for her in 2005.

== Works ==
- The diffusion of information among the working poor. Ann Arbor: University Microfilms International, 1984.
- "Field Research: Methodological Themes". Library and Information Science Research. 6 (4): 425–38. 1984.
- "Information, Mass Media Use, and the Working Poor". Library and Information Science Research. 7 (2): 97–113. 1985.
- Chatman, Elfreda A. (1986). "Diffusion Theory: A review and test of a conceptual model in information diffusion". Journal of the American Society for Information Science. 37 (6): 377–386. doi:10.1002/(sici)1097-4571(198611)37:6<377::aid-asi2>3.0.co;2-c.
- "Opinion Leadership, Poverty, and Information Sharing". Reference Quarterly. 26 (3): 341–53. 1987.
- "The Information World of Low-Skilled Workers". Library and Information Science Research. 9 (4): 265–83. 1987.
- Chatman, Elfreda A. (1991). "Life in a Small World: Applicability of Gratification Theory to Information-Seeking Behavior". Journal of the American Society for Information Science. 42 (6): 438–449. doi:10.1002/(SICI)1097-4571(199107)42:6<438::AID-ASI6>3.0.CO;2-B.
- "Alienation theory: Application of a conceptual framework to a study of information among janitors". Reference Quarterly. 29 (3): 355. 1990.
- "Channels to a Larger Social World: Older Women Staying in Contact with the Great Society". Library and Information Science Research. 13 (3): 281–300. 1991.
- The information world of retired women. New York: Greenwood Press, 1992.
- "The Role of Mentorship in Shaping Public Library Leaders". Library Trends. 40 (3): 492–512. 1992.
- Pendleton, Victoria (1995). "Knowledge Gap, Information-Seeking and the Poor". Reference Librarian. 49–50: 135–145.
- Chatman, Elfreda A. (1996). "The Impoverished Life-World of Outsiders". Journal of the American Society for Information Science. 47 (3): 193–206. doi:10.1002/(sici)1097-4571(199603)47:3<193::aid-asi3>3.3.co;2-m.
- Pendleton, Victoria (1998). "Small World Lives: Implications for the public library". Library Trends. 46 (4): 732.
- Chatman, Elfreda A. (1999). "A Theory of Life in the Round". Journal of the American Society for Information Science and Technology. 50 (3): 207–217. doi:10.1002/(sici)1097-4571(1999)50:3<207::aid-asi3>3.3.co;2-#.
- Chatman, Elfreda A. (2000-12-01). "Framing social life in theory and research". The New Review of Information Behaviour Research. 1: 3–17.
- Huotari, Maija-Leena (2001). "Using everyday life information seeking to explain organizational behavior". Library & Information Science Research. 23 (4): 351–366. doi:10.1016/s0740-8188(01)00093-7.
- Burnett, Gary; Besant, Michele (2001). "Small Worlds: Normative behavior in virtual communities and feminist bookselling". Journal of the American Society for Information Science and Technology. 52 (7): 536–547. doi:10.1002/asi.1102.abs.
- Dawson, E. Murrell (2001). "Reference group theory with implications for information studies: a theoretical essay". Information Research: An International Electronic Journal. 6 (3): 105.
