= Aaron Halfaker =

American computer scientist (born 1983)

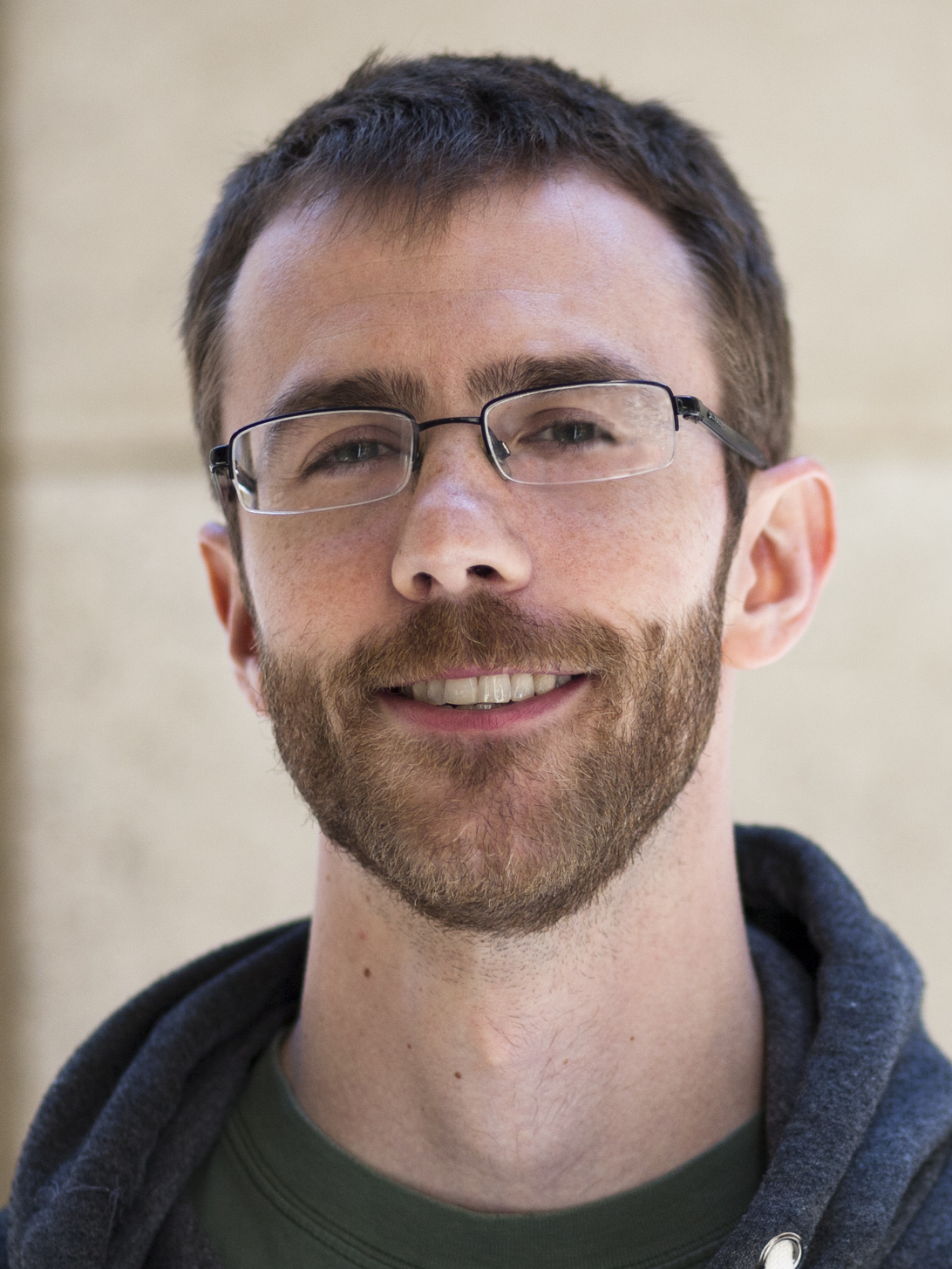
- Halfaker in September 2013
- Born: December 27, 1983 (age 42); Virginia, Minnesota, US
- Education: The College of St. Scholastica (BS); University of Minnesota (PhD)
- Scientific career
- Fields: Open production; Wikipedia; Social science; Human–computer interaction; Computer-supported cooperative work
- Workplaces: Microsoft Research; Wikimedia Foundation; Google
- Thesis: Maintaining the efficiency of open production systems at scale: A case study of wikipedia (2013)
- Doctoral advisor: John T. Riedl
- Halfaker's voice recorded January 2017
- Website: halfaker.info

Aaron Halfaker (/ˈhæfeɪkər/; born December 27, 1983) is a principal applied scientist at Microsoft Research. He previously served as a research scientist at the Wikimedia Foundation until 2020.

== Education ==
Halfaker earned a Bachelor of Science degree in computer science from the College of St. Scholastica in 2006, where he started off as a physical therapy major but switched to computer science after taking a programming class with Diana Johnson. He subsequently earned a PhD in computer science from the GroupLens Research lab at the University of Minnesota in 2013.

== Career and research ==
Halfaker is known for his research about the decrease in the number of active editors on Wikipedia. He has said in autumn 2013 that Wikipedia began a "decline phase" around 2007 and has continued to decline since then. Halfaker has also studied software agents (bots) on Wikipedia, and the way they affect new contributors to the site. While a graduate student he developed a tool for Wikipedia editing called Snuggle with Stuart Geiger. Snuggle tackles vandalism on Wikipedia and highlights constructive contributions by new editors. He has also built an artificial intelligence (AI) service called Objective Revision Evaluation Service (ORES) in 2015, used to identify vandalism on Wikipedia and distinguish it from good faith edits.

== See also ==
- List of Wikipedia people
