= Mike McCue =

American businessman

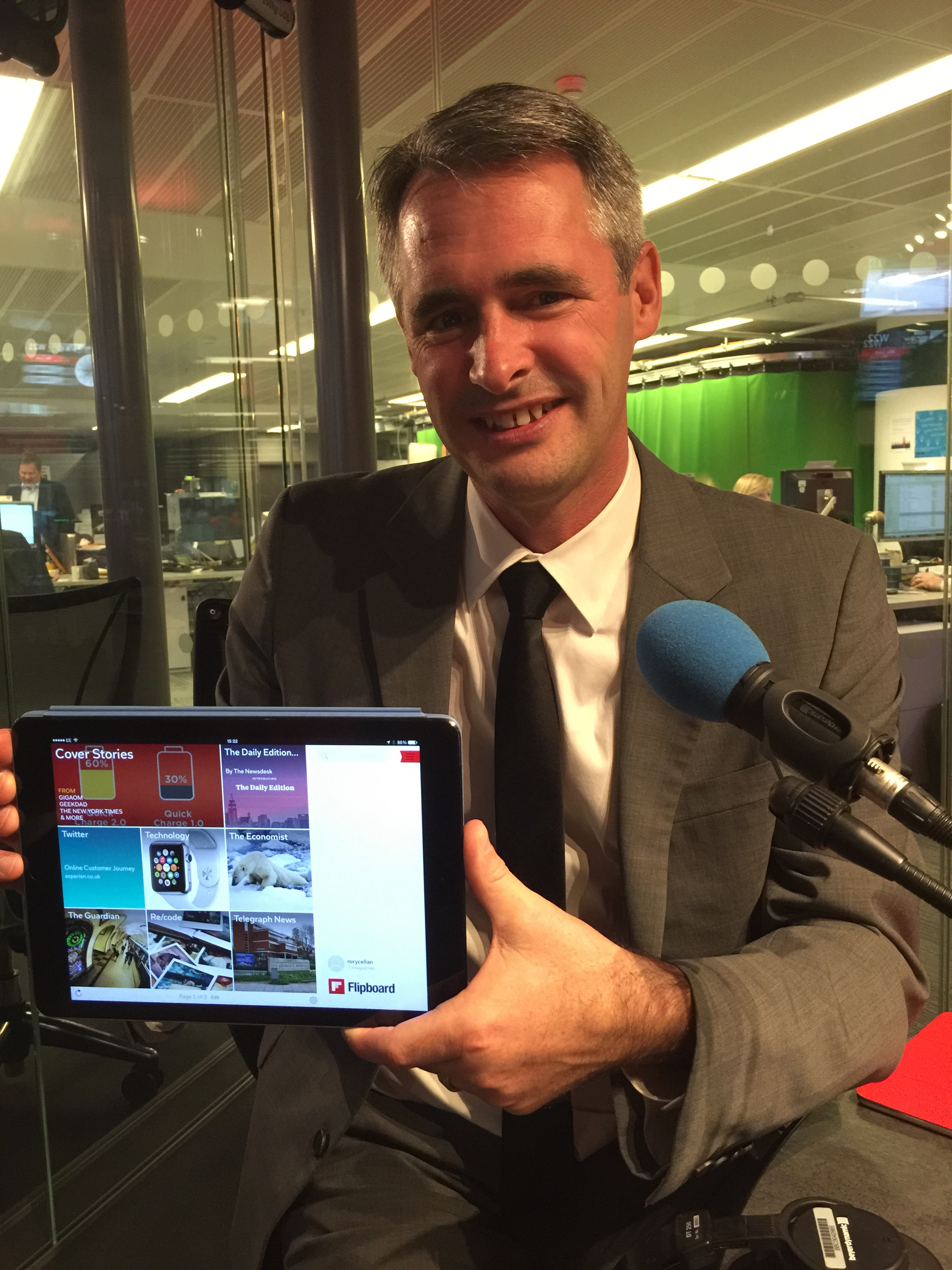
- McCue showing his application, Flipboard
- Born: 1968 (age 57–58); United States
- Occupation: Technology entrepreneur
- Known for: founder of Paper Software, Tellme Networks, and Flipboard

Mike McCue (born 1968) is an American technology entrepreneur who founded or co-founded Paper Software, Tellme Networks, and Flipboard.

== Early life ==
McCue grew up in New York City, the oldest of six children. His parents, Lucy Ann and Patrick J., ran a small ad agency. In McCue's early teens, his father was diagnosed with terminal cancer. The family was forced out of their home and had to rely on food stamps due to a lack of health insurance. After his father died of cancer, McCue chose to help his family instead of joining the United States Air Force Academy, and never attended college.

== Career ==
=== Early career ===
McCue became interested in software in his early teens and began writing video games at home, which he licensed to magazines and eventually to a game publisher. He said his first real application was a space shuttle flight simulator that he wrote in TI-BASIC in 1981.

Influenced by technology entrepreneurs such as Steve Jobs, Mitch Kapor and Bill Gates, he joined IBM in 1986 after giving up a congressional nomination to attend the US Air Force Academy. He was initially employed on a six-month temporary contract but remained at IBM for three and a half years.

=== Paper Software and Netscape ===
In 1989 McCue founded his first company, Paper Software, aiming "to make using a computer as easy as using a piece of paper". At first the company was not successful and McCue spent a summer digging ditches and building houses to raise funds, and then doing software design consulting for a company contracted to the pharmaceutical firm Merck & Co.

Paper Software's first product was Sidebar, a set of icons designed to make using a computer more intuitive, but after discovering Mosaic, McCue began to develop technology allowing web browsers to display complex 3-D graphics. McCue acted as CEO, winning nearly 80% market share in 3D internet software from Microsoft and SGI.

McCue rejected offers for Paper Software from America Online and Silicon Graphics before selling to Netscape for $20 million in February 1996. At Netscape McCue was appointed Vice President of Technology, helping to create Netscape Netcaster and working on transforming its Netscape Navigator browser into a Web-based desktop operating system. It has been said that the project, called Constellation after a boat McCue's father had helped to restore, led Microsoft to alter its Windows licensing agreements to prevent PC manufacturers using competing software, eventually leading to antitrust proceedings against the company.

When McCue later paid $200,000 for a 48-foot classic wooden sailboat, he named it "Constellation.”

=== Tellme Networks and Microsoft ===
In February 1999, McCue left Netscape to co-found Tellme Networks with Angus Davis. McCue had previously recruited Davis to work at Netscape when he was 19 years old and credited him with the idea for the new company. Tellme went on to raise $238 million in venture capital.

Tellme launched in July 2000 with the ambition of creating a 'voice browser' by using voice-recognition software to allow users to find internet-based information through their telephone with simple voice commands. "When you pick up a phone," McCue explained in 2001, "you'll hear a friendly voice say, 'What would you like to do?' and you'll be able to place a call or do a whole variety of things using simple key words."

Tellme became the standard for "voice browsers" and in March 2007 the company was acquired by Microsoft for a rumoured $800 million.

McCue described his efforts to make design a higher priority at Microsoft as a work in progress during his time at the company, "I'd give it probably a 'C-plus' to a 'B' right now," he said in 2009.

=== Flipboard ===
McCue left Microsoft in June 2009. In January 2010, he co-founded, with Evan Doll, one of the early engineers on the iPhone team at Apple, Flipboard, the "social magazine" app for Apple's iPad. Flipboard launched in July 2010 having secured $10.5 million of venture capital from investors including John Doerr of Kleiner Perkins Caufield & Byers (who had also invested in Tellme), Index Ventures, The Chernin Group, Twitter creator Jack Dorsey, Facebook's co-founder Dustin Moskovitz, and Ashton Kutcher.

Flipboard evolved from a thought experiment undertaken by McCue and Doll in which they asked what the web would look like if it was washed away in a hurricane and needed to be built again from scratch with the knowledge of hindsight. "We thought," said McCue, "it would be possible to build something from the ground up that was inherently social. And we thought that new form factors like the tablet would enable content to be presented in ways that were fundamentally more beautiful." McCue said that when reading magazines like National Geographic he would ask himself: "Why is it that the Web isn't as beautiful as these magazines? What could we do to make the web a more beautiful place?"

McCue was critical of the way that journalism appeared on the web, saying that it had been "contaminated by the Web form factor" and was being pushed into trying to support the monetization model of the web by driving page views with slide shows, condensed columns of narrow text and distracting advertisements, a space where, he said, "I don't think it should ever go". "It's not ... a pleasant experience to 'curl up' with a good website", he said.

They recruited Marcos Weskamp, the designer who had created newsmap.jp in 2004 to display a graphical heat map of stories from Google News. Flipboard became a social magazine, allowing people to consume content from Facebook and Twitter.

By December 2010, Flipboard claimed that they were installed on about 10% of the 8-9 million iPads then in circulation; Apple named Flipboard its iPad app of the year. In April 2011 McCue confirmed a $50 million round of financing, valuing Flipboard at $200 million.

In August 2018, Flipboard claimed they had 145 million monthly users with 11,000 publishers.

=== Twitter ===
McCue served on the board of directors at Twitter from December 2010 until August 2012. He was initially appointed as a compromise candidate between the company and Kleiner Perkins Caufield & Byers, from whom Twitter had just raised $200 million in a round of funding. His recruitment led to speculation that Twitter was heading towards creating a media and publishing business.

McCue has had a long association with Kleiner Perkins, which invested in Netscape, Tellme Networks and Flipboard. Ellen Pao, who was a junior partner at the firm when he joined the board of Twitter, was also a board member at Flipboard having worked with McCue at Tellme. McCue praised the work of Pao and Kleiner Perkins, restating that opinion when Pao brought a gender-discrimination lawsuit against the venture capital firm in 2012.

McCue's departure came as Twitter moved to reassess the terms of its use by third-party developers and as it was beginning to enhance its own presentation of news articles and other information, moving it potentially into competition with Flipboard. In September 2012, McCue cautioned Twitter against compromising its existing relationships, telling The Daily Telegraph: "Twitter was created as an open platform, an open communications ecosystem, and I hope it can stay that way. You have to be really careful not to let money get in the way of that."

== Personal life ==
In June 2013, McCue hosted U.S. President Barack Obama at his home in Palo Alto for a Democratic fundraiser that cost each guest $2500.
