= Thomas D. Wilson =

British information scientist (born 1935)

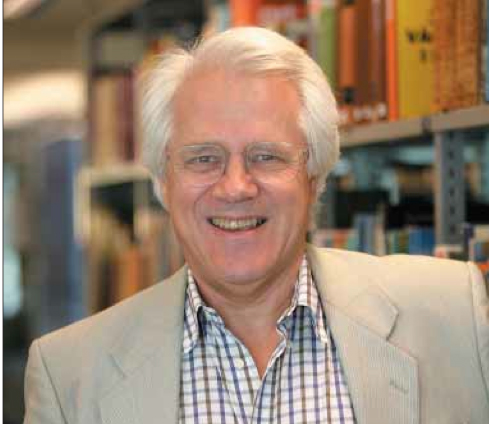
- Wilson in 2018
- Born: 18 January 1935 (age 91); Shincliffe Station, Co. Durham, England
- Education: University of London, University of Sheffield
- Known for: Information management, information seeking behaviour,
- Spouse: Nyra Tully (m. 1960, died 2024)
- Awards: 2020 Jason Farradane Award; 2017. Award of Merit Association for Information Science and Technology; 2010. Honorary doctorate from the University of Murcia, Spain; 2008."Bobcat of the year"; 2005. Honorary doctorate, Gothenburg University; 2000. ASIS&T SIG USE award; 1993 Honorary Fellow of the Institute of Information Scientists.
- Scientific career
- Fields: Library and Information Science
- Workplaces: Newcastle upon Tyne Polytechnic (now Northumbria University, University of Sheffield, University of Borås

Thomas D. Wilson (born 18 January 1935) is a British researcher in information science and his research has focused on information management and information seeking behaviour. He has been contributing to the field since 1961, which was when he received his Fellowship from the British Library Association. He is the founder of the online journal for the information sciences, Information Research. Dr. Wilson has created and revised a model of information behavior as well as the Nested Model. He has won a number of prestigious awards, the two most recent being the Award of Merit Association for Information Science and Technology in 2017 and the Jason Farradane Award in 2020.

Currently, he is Professor Emeritus at the University of Sheffield Information School and University of Borås, Sweden.

== Biography ==
Thomas Daniel Wilson was born in 1935 at Shincliffe Station in County Durham, England. He left school at age 16 to work as a library assistant in Durham County Library. Following national service in the Royal Air Force he returned to Durham County Library and took the examinations of the Library Association to qualify as a professional librarian. He then moved to being head of a small academic library. He then worked as a corporate librarian for the Nuclear Research Centre of C. A. Parsons, at which time he became interested in the use of new technology in information science.

After completing his Fellowship of the Library Association he began his academic career in 1961, with a move to the library school of the Municipal College of Commerce, now Northumbria University. He subsequently obtained an external degree of London University by independent study BSc degree in economics and sociology, and a doctorate in organization theory.

He is now Professor Emeritus at the Information School, University of Sheffield, and has been Visiting Professor at Leeds University Business School, and Professor Catedratico Convidado in the Faculty of Engineering at the University of Porto. He has also been Senior Professor at the University of Borås, Sweden, and is now Professor Emeritus of that University.

== Research history ==
In the area of information behaviour (a term he invented to cover all activities associated with seeking, acquiring, using and sharing information) Dr. Wilson has focused largely in analyzing how individuals and groups gather and communicate information.

=== INISS Project ===
Dr. Wilson's best-known study on information seeking behaviour was the INISS project, conducted from 1980 to 1985. The aim of the project was to increase the efficiency of Social Services workers in the management of information. In addition to the traditional methods of surveys and interviews with those seeking the information, Dr. Wilson and his team also observed social workers and their managers in their day-to-day tasks, to see what techniques were actually used to find, use and communicate information. He observed that, in the environment of a Social Services office, the majority of information (60%) was oral, with a further 10% being notes taken on oral communication. That, combined with lack of training in using the other information sources available, had led to a lack of organized information being used at Social Services offices. He recommended the establishment of a central library for Social Services information, along with training staff to access that information, as well as more communication within each office on information needs.

=== Uncertainty in Information Seeking ===
More recently, Dr. Wilson looked at information seeking behaviour for the British Library Research and Innovation Centre. The resulting paper, "Uncertainty in Information Seeking," identified that information seeking is based on a series of uncertainty resolutions which lead to a problem solution. There are four steps in the process, problem identification, problem definition, problem resolution, and solution statement. At each step of the process, more information must be gathered in order to resolve the uncertainty of that step. Also, the research established that by providing information seekers with a pattern to follow (such as the four step uncertainty resolution pattern), the accuracy and volume of information they acquired was increased.

=== Activity theory ===
Recently, Dr. Wilson has been an advocate for the adoption of activity theory in the area of information behaviour and in information systems research. Earlier activity theory diagrams by Bedny and Engerström have been combined and edited by Dr. Wilson to better represent the flow of information. A new diagram was created, a process model of activity, with Motivation and Goal and how they prepare the information environment for activity. He stresses that activity theory is not predictive, but rather a framework attempting to describe human behaviour.

=== Information management ===
Throughout his research career, Dr. Wilson has also been active in the field of information management and was the founder and first editor of the International Journal of Information Management. His research in this area included early studies on business use of the World Wide Web, the relationship of information systems and business performance and the application of mobile information systems in policing.

== Wilson's model of information behavior ==
Wilson's model of information seeking behaviour was born out of a need to focus the field of information and library science on human use of information, rather than the use of sources.

Previous studies undertaken in the field were primarily concerned with systems, specifically, how an individual uses a system. Very little had been written that examined an individual's information needs, or how information seeking behaviour related to other task-oriented behaviours.

Wilson's first model came from a presentation at the University of Maryland in 1971 when "an attempt was made to map the processes involved in what was known at the time as "user need research".

=== Wilson's first model ===
Published in 1981, Wilson's first model outlined the factors leading to information seeking, and the barriers inhibiting action. It stated that information-seeking was prompted by an individual's physiological, cognitive, or affective needs, which have their roots in personal factors, role demands, or environmental context.

In order to satisfy these needs, an individual makes demands upon various information systems such as the library and the use of technology. The user may also contact an intermediary such as family, friends and colleagues. The information provided by any of the contacted sources is then evaluated to determine if it satisfies the individual's needs. This first model was based on an understanding of human information-seeking behaviors that are best understood as three interwoven frameworks: The user, the information system, and the information resource.

==== First revision in 1994 ====
Wilson later built upon his original model in order to understand the personal circumstance, social role, and environmental context in which an information need is created. This new model, altered in 1994 incorporated Ellis' stages of information-seeking: starting, browsing, differentiating, monitoring, extracting, verifying and ending.

The new model It also displayed the physiological, affective, and cognitive needs that give rise to information seeking behaviour. The model recognized that an information need is not a need in and of itself, but rather one that stems from a previous psychological need. These needs are generated by the interplay of personal habits and political, economic, and technological factors in an individual's environmental. The factors that drive needs can also obstruct an individual's search for information.

==== Second revision in 1996 ====
In 1996 Wilson proposed a third, general model that built upon the previous two. This model incorporated several new elements that helped to demonstrate the stages experienced by the 'person in context', or searcher, when looking for information. These included an intermediate stage between the acknowledgement of a need and the initiation of action, a redefining of the barriers he proposed in his second model as "intervening variables" to show that factors can be supportive or preventative a feedback loop, and an "activating mechanism" stage.

'Activating mechanisms' identify relevant impetus that prompt a decision to seek information, and integrate behavioural theories such as 'stress/coping theory', 'risk/reward theory' and 'social learning theory'.

=== Nested model ===
In 1999, Wilson developed a nested model that brought together different areas of research in the study of information behavior. The model represented research topics as a series of nested fields, with information behavior as the general area of investigation, information-seeking behavior as its sub-set, and information searching behavior as a further sub-set.

=== An evolving model ===
Wilson's model has changed over time, and will continue to evolve as technology and the nature of information changes. The model has been cited and discussed by leaders in the information science field, and can be integrated with other significant theories of information behaviour. Wilson describes the model diagrams as elaborating on one another, saying "no one model stands alone and in using the model to guide the development of research ideas, it is necessary to examine and reflect upon all of the diagrams".

Recently, there has been a shift from theorizing on research already conducted on information behaviour, to pursuing "research within specific theoretical contexts". Wilson's Model is "aimed at linking theories to action"; however, it is this move from theory to action that is proving slow. Through numerous qualitative studies, "we now have many in depth investigations into the information seeking behavior of small samples of people". Despite these studies, there have not been many links made between this research and changes in policy or practice.

Wilson's model has undergone further evolution in his book "Exploring information behaviour: an introduction", published in 2022. In this book he suggests that "information discovery" should be used instead of "information seeking", since information behaviour includes much more than the deliberate seeking of information. He then expands information discovery to include intentional discovery and accidental discovery, with the latter divided into "passive attention" and "coincident discovery".

== Information research ==
In addition to this work, Dr. Wilson also founded Information Research, an online journal for the information sciences. This is a freely available, Open Access journal, which constitutes an excellent resource for IS students and researchers. He self-published the journal until 2017 when he gave ownership to the Swedish School of Library and Information Science at the University of Borås. It is now hosted by the Publicera site of the Royal Library, the Swedish National Library. Volume 30, No. 2, of Information Research is a special issue celebrating the 30th anniversary of the founding of the journal. The issue includes papers on the work of Dr. Wilson, as well as bibliometric studies of the journal.

== Post-retirement activities ==
On his retirement from the University of Sheffield, Dr. Wilson continued to engage in research as a member of the AIMTech Research Group at the University of Leeds Business School, which carried out projects on information in policing, and through projects at the Swedish School of Library and Information Science at the University of Borås, where he participated in a number of European Union projects, including the SHAMAN project on long-term digital preservation. In 2012, together with colleagues at the University of Borås and Gothenburg University, he was awarded a grant of 11.8 million Swedish kronor ($1.7 million) by Vetenskapsrådet (Swedish Research Council) for a programme of research into the production, distribution and use of e-books in Sweden. The research led to the publication of Books on screens: players in the Swedish e-book market, published by Nordicom, Gothenburg, Sweden.

Since his retirement from the University of Borås, Dr. Wilson continues to pursue research independently and with former colleagues. His most recent publications deal with the motivations for promoting misinformation, the early study of information seeking behaviour in psychology, and the role of curiosity in information seeking.

In 2022 Dr. Wilson produced a self-published, open access book, "Exploring information behaviour: an introduction", which has now been translated into Indonesian, Korean, Lithuanian, Polish, and Portuguese, with further translations into Spanish, Chinese, Japanese, French, Italian, and Thai, pending.

== Awards ==
- 2020 Jason Farradane Award
- 2017. Award of Merit Association for Information Science and Technology.
- 2010. Honorary doctorate from the University of Murcia, Spain.
- 2008."Bobcat of the year" for "outstanding contributions in promoting European library and information science" by EUCLID, the European Association for Library and Information Education and Research.
- 2005. Honorary doctorate from Gothenburg University,
- 2000. ASIS&T SIG USE award for "outstanding contributions to information behavior".
- 1993. Honorary Fellow of the Institute of Information Scientists (now Chartered Institute of Information and Library Professionals)

== See also ==
- Wilson's model of information behavior - a model by Wilson about information behavior.
