= Nokia Point & Find =

Mobile application for Nokia smartphones

Nokia Point & Find is a mobile application, which lets you point your Nokia smartphone camera at objects and images you want to know more about, to find more information. It is a visual search technology that uses the phone's camera to obtain information by using image recognition to identify objects, images and places in the physical world in real-time. For example, one can use the application to find information on movies by pointing the camera at movie posters and then view reviews, or find tickets at nearby theaters. Its uses include city landmark tagging, barcode scanning for comparison shopping and 2D barcode scanning and finding information related to products and services based on content provided by third party publishers.

== Technology ==
Nokia Point & Find makes use of the mixed reality (MR) platform. Mixed reality is a combination of augmented reality (AR) and augmented virtuality as described in the virtuality continuum. Nokia Point & Find is based on real-time image processing and object recognition technology originally developed by Philipp Schloter, founder of PIXTO, a start-up company acquired by Nokia.

== Uses ==
=== Shopping ===
By pointing the camera at a barcode, Nokia Point & Find retrieves information about product pricing and availability.

=== City guide ===
When a Nokia Point & Find user points their device at a building they may see tags that were added by other Point & Find users, creating the possibility of real-time mobile discovery. This could be useful for travel and exploration of new cities. It enables the user to tag a building and for any Nokia Point & Find user to retrieve the information at a later date.

=== Advertising and branding ===
Publishers and advertisers are able to create and publish their own content, via a content management system provided by Nokia Point & Find. The content published in these third-party "worlds" can be retrieved and accessed by Point & Find users when pointing their camera phone at specific products, images or buildings.

== Restrictions ==
Point & Find was only available for limited Nokia smartphones including the N97, N97 Mini, 5800 XpressMusic, 5530 XpressMusic, 5230 and X6. An Internet connection is required to make use of the application. Nokia charges third-party publishers to create their own Point & Find content. Later the app was made available on other platforms as well.

== Hardware limitations ==
Nokia Point & Find depends on extensive use of the on-board camera and GPS. This can cause a substantial decrease in battery life.

== See also ==
- Google Goggles
- Nokia JobLens
- Nokia Camera
