= Google Voice Search =

Speech recognition technology

- Developer: Google
- Release: May 20, 2012; 14 years ago
- Available in: Multilingual
- Type: Search by voice on your mobile phone and desktop PC
- Website: www.google.com/search/about/

Google Voice Search or Search by Voice is a Google product that allows users to use Google Search by speaking on a mobile phone or computer, i.e. have the device search for data upon entering information on what to search into the device by speaking.

Initially named as Voice Action which allowed one to give speech commands to an Android phone. Once only available for the U.S. English locale – commands were later recognizable and replied to in American, British, and Indian English; Filipino, French, Italian, German, and Spanish.

In Android 4.1+ (Jelly Bean), it was merged with Google Now.

In August 2014, a new feature was added to Google Voice Search, allowing users to choose up to five languages and the app will automatically understand the spoken language.

== History ==
Google Voice Search was a tool from Google Labs that allowed someone to use their phone to make a Google query. After the user called (650) 623-6706, the number of Google Voice's search system, they would wait for the words Say your Search Keywords and then say the keywords. Next, they would either wait to have the page updated, or click on a link to bring up the search page the user requested. At the moment, both the demo of this service and the page have been shut down. Since the introduction of the service, products from Google, such as GOOG-411, Google Maps and Google Mobile App, have been developed to use speech recognition technology in various ways.

On June 14, 2011, Google announced at its Inside Google Search event that it would start to roll out Voice Search on Google.com during the coming days.

On October 30, 2012, Google released a new Google Search app for iOS, which featured an enhanced Google Voice Search function, similar to that of the Voice Search function found in Google's Android Jelly Bean and aimed to compete with Apple's own Siri voice assistant. The new app has been compared favorably by reviewers to Siri and The Unofficial Apple Weblog's side-by-side comparison said that Google's Voice Search on iOS is "amazingly quick and relevant, and has more depth [than Siri]". Of note is that as of May 2016 20% of search queries on mobile devices were done through voice with the number expected to grow.

== Supported languages ==
The following languages and variants are partially supported in Google Voice Search:

- Abaza (since 2021)
- Afrikaans (since 2010)
- Albanian (since 2020)
- Amharic (since 2017)
- Arabic (since 2006)
- Armenian (since 2017)
- Azerbaijani (since 2017)
- Basque (since 2012)
- Bangla (since 2017)
- Bulgarian (since 2012)
- Burmese (since 2018)
- Catalan (since 2012)
- Czech (since 2010)
- Danish (since 2014)
- Dutch (since 2010)
- English (Australia, Canada, India, New Zealand, South Africa, UK, US), some variants since 2008 launch
- Filipino (since 2013)
- Finnish (since 2012)
- French (since 2010)
- Galician (since 2012)
- Georgian (since 2017)
- German (since 2010)
- Greek (since 2014)
- Gujarati (since 2017)
- Hebrew (since 2011)
- Hindi (since 2008)
- Hungarian (since 2012)
- Icelandic (since 2012)
- Italian (since 2010)
- Indonesian (since 2011)
- Japanese (since 2009)
- Javanese (since 2017)
- Kannada (since 2017)
- Korean (since 2010)
- Khmer (since 2017)
- Kurdish (since 2021)
- Kyrgyz (since 2022)
- Lao (since 2017)
- Latin
- Latvian (since 2017)
- Lithuanian (since 2015)
- Luxembourgish (since 2020)
- Macedonian (since 2020)
- Mandarin Chinese (Traditional Taiwan, Simplified China, Traditional Hong Kong) since 2009
- Malay (since 2011)
- Malayalam (since 2017)
- Marathi (since 2017)
- Mongolian (since 2020)
- Myanmar (Burmese) (since 2017)
- Nepali (since 2017)
- Norwegian (since 2012)
- Persian (since 2013)
- Polish (since 2010)
- Pig Latin (since April 1, 2011, not officially listed)
- Portuguese (Brazilian; European since 2012)
- Punjabi (since 2020)
- Romanian (since 2012)
- Russian (since 2010)
- Serbian (since 2012)
- Sindhi (since 2021)
- Sinhala (since 2017)
- Slovak (since 2012)
- Spanish (since 2010, Latin American Spanish since 2011)
- Sundanese (since 2017)
- Swahili (since 2017)
- Swedish (since 2012)
- Tamil (since 2017)
- Telugu (since 2017)
- Turkish (since 2010)
- Urdu (since 2017)
- Uzbek (since 2018)
- Yue Chinese (Traditional Hong Kong, since 2010)
- Zulu (since 2010)
- Vietnamese (since 2015)

== Integration in other Google products ==
=== Google Maps with voice search ===
In the summer of 2008, Google added voice search to the BlackBerry Pearl version of Google Maps for mobile, allowing Pearl users to say their searches in addition to typing them.

=== Google Mobile App with voice search ===
The Google Mobile app for Blackberry and Nokia (Symbian) mobiles allows users to search Google by voice at the touch of a button by speaking their queries. Google also introduced voice search to all "Google Experience" Android phones with the 1.1 platform update, which includes the functionality on board the built-in Google Search widget.

In November 2008, Google added voice search to Google Mobile App on iPhone. With a later update, Google announced Voice Search for iPod touch. It requires a third party microphone. On August 5, 2009, T-Mobile launched the MyTouch 3G with Google, which features one-touch Google Voice Search.

== See also ==
- Microsoft Cortana
- Siri
