= Carol Kuhlthau =

American library educator and researcher

- Born: December 2, 1937 (age 88); New Brunswick, New Jersey U.S.
- Education: Rutgers, the State University of New Jersey, Ed.D 1983
- Occupations: Librarian; academic; researcher
- Known for: Information seeking behavior, Kuhlthau ISP model
- Awards: ALA Award for Research (1998) ALISE Award for Professional Contribution Library and Information Science Education (2004) ASIS&T Award for Merit (2013)

Carol Collier Kuhlthau (born December 2, 1937) is a Distinguished Professor Emerita of Library and Information Science in the School of Communication and Information (SC&I) at Rutgers University, researcher, and international speaker on learning in school libraries, information literacy, and information seeking behavior. She introduced the model of the Information Search Process (ISP), which is used throughout the field of information science.

== Biography ==
Kuhlthau was born in New Brunswick, New Jersey, U.S. She graduated from Kean University in 1959, completing a master's degree in Librarianship in 1974 at Rutgers University, and a doctorate in Education in 1983. She was on the faculty of the Rutgers University Department Library and Information Science for more than 20 years and Professor Emeritus since 2006.

Kuhlthau is the founder of the Center for International Scholarship in School Libraries.

== Research ==
Introduced in 1991, Kuhlthau's model of the Information Search Process (ISP) describes feelings, thoughts and actions in six stages of information seeking. The model of the ISP introduced the holistic experience of information seeking from the individual's perspective, stressed the important role of affect in information seeking and proposed an uncertainty principle as a conceptual framework for library and information service.

She is known internationally for her research on the ISP and she has received numerous awards. The ISP model represents a watershed in the development of new strategies for the delivery of K–16 library and information skills. While the ISP model is effective, research applying the ISP model to international students found that both groups experience similar emotional patterns of uncertainty and confusion during the exploratory stages of information seeking, as outlined by Kuhlthau. It was found that international students often encounter additional challenges due to multilingual searching. These challenges can lead to confusion when reconciling conflicting cultural perspectives and evaluating the reliability of sources.

Kuhlthau's research continues to be used today to improve information seeking. One study suggested that incorporating ISP principles into prompt engineering may improve generative AI’s capacity to deliver relevant support and guide users through their research activities using chat services such as Ask A Librarian or ChatGPT.

== Education ==
Kuhlthau received her B.S. from Kean University in 1959, Master's in Library Science (MLS) from Rutgers University in 1974 and her Doctorate in Education in 1983, also from Rutgers University. Her doctoral dissertation was titled "The Library Research Process: Case Studies and Interventions with High School Seniors in Advanced Placement English Classes Using Kelly's Theory of Constructs."

She held several teaching and library positions before joining the Rutgers faculty in 1985 where for twenty years she directed the school library specialization in the Masters in Library and Information Science degree program that is ranked first in the United States by U.S. News & World Report. During her tenure at Rutgers she was promoted to Professor II and chaired the Library and Information Science Department and retired as Professor Emerita in 2006. She was the founding Director of the Center for International Scholarship in School Libraries (CISSL) at Rutgers where she continues as senior advisor.

Her book Seeking Meaning: A Process Approach to Library and Information Services is a classic text in library and information science in the United States and abroad. Guided Inquiry: Learning in the 21st Century (2007) 2nd Ed (2015), written with Leslie Maniotes and Ann Caspari, recommends learning environments where students gain deep understanding and also information literacy grounded in the Information Search Process. Guided Inquiry Design: A Framework for Inquiry in Your School (2012) written with Leslie Maniotes, PhD and Ann Caspari is a full description of the instructional design framework called Guided Inquiry Design a complete approach to inquiry based learning from a learning perspective.

== Selected writings ==
- Guided Inquiry Design: A Framework for Inquiry in Your School with Leslie Maniotes and Ann Caspari (2012)
- Guided Inquiry: Learning in the 21st Century with Leslie Maniotes and Ann Caspari (2007) revised second edition (2015)
- Seeking Meaning: A Process Approach to Library and Information Services (2004)
- Teaching the Library Research Process (1994, 2004)
- “Inside the Search Process: Information Seeking from the User's Perspective”, Journal of the American Society for Information Science, Vol.42 (5), pp. 361-371 (1991)

== Awards ==
- American Society for Information Science and Technology (ASIS&T) Research in Information Science Award, 2005 and ASIS&T Award of Merit, 2013.
- Association for Library and Information Science Education (ALISE) Award for Professional Contribution Library and Information Science Education, 2004
- Library and Information Technology Association (LITA) Frederick G. Kilgour Research Award, 2002
- Association of College and Research Libraries (ACRL) Miriam Dudley Instruction Librarian Award, 2000
- American Library Association (ALA) Jesse Shera Award for Research, 1998
- American Association of School Librarians (AASL) Distinguished Service Award, 2000
- Association for Educational Communications and Technology (AECT) Award for Outstanding Contributions to the School Library Media Field through Publishing, and Teaching

== See also ==
- Information Search Process
