= 800-The-Info =

- Current owner: Verizon
- Country: United States
- Discontinued: Yes
- Markets: United States
- Website: www.800theinfo.com

800-The-Info (or 1-800-843-4636) was a toll-free directory assistance (DA) and information service provided in the United States by Verizon. 800-The-Info was subsidized by businesses that purchase advertising space on the service. Callers did not pay for the service, but had to listen to ads. The service offered local business listings including numbers and addresses.

== How it worked ==
Like other advertising supported services, callers use a toll-free number to reach an automated system. They then can ask for a particular business, or ask for business recommendations by a location in a city. This type of category search is different from typical 411 requests that focus on asking for specific listings. At the outset, the system plays an advertisement and there can be other ads later on in the call. The system can also provide details to the caller's wireless phone via text message.

== The free-DA market ==
Verizon’s service competed with many new entrants providing similar services. 1-800-FREE-411 was the market leader with reportedly 20 million calls per month in 2007. AT&T's yellow pages, and others, were competing for this small but growing segment. Growth figures suggested that the segment would reach 1.5 billion calls per year in the U.S. by 2010.

Nearly all of these services targeted traditional, paid DA services, rates of which can range from $0.39 on a landline phone to $1.99 (i.e. Verizon wireless) or more on cell phones. This form of pure substitution may bring in new users but it also will capture volume from traditional DA services.

What was not clear for any of these providers is whether there will be enough expansion in advertisers to support the business model.

== See also ==
- 4-1-1
- Bing Mobile
- Speech recognition
