= John T. Riedl =

American computer scientist

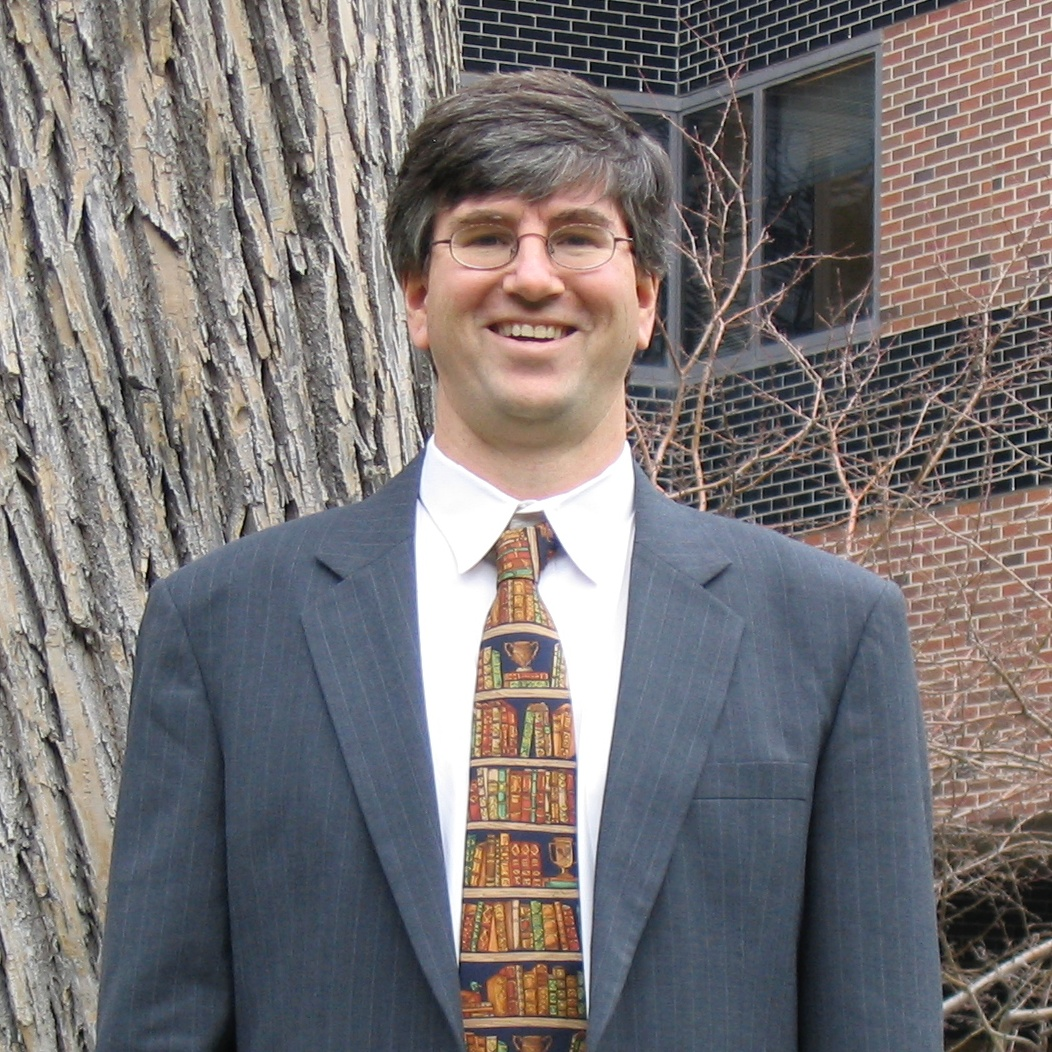
- Riedl in 2004
- Born: John Thomas Riedl; January 16, 1962
- Died: July 15, 2013 (aged 51); Wisconsin, US
- Education: University of Notre Dame (B.S.); Purdue University (M.S., Ph.D.)
- Awards: IEEE Fellow (2012), ACM Fellow (2010)
- Scientific career
- Fields: Computer Science, Human-Computer Interaction
- Workplaces: University of Minnesota (1990–2013); Purdue University (1983–1989)
- Doctoral students: Aaron Halfaker; Ed Chi

John Thomas Riedl (January 16, 1962 – July 15, 2013) was an American computer scientist and the McKnight Distinguished Professor at the University of Minnesota. His published works include highly influential research on the social web, recommendation systems, and collaborative systems.

== Life and work ==
John Riedl received his B.S. in Mathematics from the University of Notre Dame in 1983 and his M.S. in Computer Science from Purdue University in 1985. He completed his Ph.D. in Computer Science at Purdue University in 1990. He became an assistant professor at the University of Minnesota in 1990, and was promoted to associate professor in 1996 and again to professor in 2003.

At the university, he led the GroupLens Research group. In 2012 he was awarded the McKnight Distinguished Professor position. During his time as a professor he advised 16 Ph.D. students who went on to take faculty positions and work at technology companies like Google, PARC, Intel, eBay, and the Wikimedia Foundation. He was also the faculty advisor for a long-running project in which twelve undergraduates each year would hone their entrepreneurial and software-development skills by taking charge of the development and maintenance of Chipmark, an online bookmark-sharing service.

He was a founder of the field of recommender systems, social computing, and interactive intelligent user interface systems. In 1996, he co-founded Net Perceptions to commercialize recommender systems research, which had "an enormous impact on e-commerce and information portals." At the height of the dot-com bubble, Net Perceptions was valued at $1.5 billion and had over 300 employees, but the company was liquidated in 2004.

Riedl died on July 15, 2013, after three years with melanoma.

== Honors and awards ==
Riedl was honored with the ACM Software System Award in 2010 for his work on recommender systems. He was named an ACM Fellow in 2009 and was also named an IEEE Fellow in 2012. He received numerous awards for his conference publications including best papers at CSCW, IUI, and WikiSym. He also received commendations for his teaching, including the Outstanding Teacher Award at the University of Minnesota four times (1990–1993, 2010–2011) and the George Taylor Award for Exceptional Contributions to Teaching (1995–96).

== Publications ==
=== Highly cited articles ===
- Resnick, Paul; Iacovou, Neophytos; Suchak, Mitesh; Bergstrom, Peter; Riedl, John (1994). "GroupLens". Proceedings of the 1994 ACM conference on Computer supported cooperative work - CSCW '94. ACM. pp. 175–186. doi:10.1145/192844.192905. ISBN 978-0-89791-689-9. S2CID 2616594.
- Sarwar, Badrul; Karypis, George; Konstan, Joseph; Riedl, John (2001). "Item-based collaborative filtering recommendation algorithms". Proceedings of the 10th international conference on World Wide Web. ACM. pp. 285–295. doi:10.1145/371920.372071. ISBN 978-1-58113-348-6. S2CID 8047550.
- Herlocker, Jonathan L.; Konstan, Joseph A.; Terveen, Loren G.; Riedl, John T. (2004). "Evaluating collaborative filtering recommender systems". ACM Transactions on Information Systems. 22 (1): 5–53. doi:10.1145/963770.963772. S2CID 207731647.
