= Ed Huai-Hsin Chi =

Computer scientist

Ed Chi
- Citizenship: American
- Education: University of Minnesota
- Scientific career
- Fields: Human-computer interaction Social computing
- Workplaces: PARC; Google
- Doctoral advisor: John T. Riedl

Ed Huai-Hsin Chi (Chinese: 紀懷新; Wade–Giles: Chi⁴ Huai²-hsin¹) (born c. 1973) is a Taiwanese American computer scientist and research scientist at Google, known for his early work in applying the theory of information scent to predict usability of websites.

== Biography ==
Born and raised in Taipei, Taiwan, Chi moved to Minnesota in the 9th grade. He obtained his BA in 1994, his MA in 1996 and his PhD in 1999, all at the University of Minnesota.

After his MA graduation, Chi worked as a research scientist at Palo Alto Research Center (PARC) from 1997 to 2011. He started as an intern and was officially hired in 1999. From 1999-2007, he worked in the User Interface Research Group, during which time he was promoted to senior research scientist in 2005. He became area manager of the Augmented Social Group in 2007. In 2011, he left PARC and became a research scientist at Google, reporting directly to Peter Norvig in the areas of human-computer interaction and social computing. In 2017, he was promoted to principal scientist at Google, and to Distinguished Scientist in 2021.

In his spare time, Chi is a golfer, Taekwondo black belt, photographer, and snowboarder.

== Work ==
Chi specializes in social computing and human-computer interaction. He has developed a computer system that predicts usability of Websites based on the theory of information scent, a theory by Peter Pirolli and Stuart Card that pioneered ways of understanding how people search for information online. He is also known for his work on information visualization and authored the book A Framework for Visualizing Information, which describes approaches to make information visualization systems easier to develop through the use of reference models. His recent research has analyzed social behavior in large sociotechnical systems like Wikipedia, Twitter, and Digg, among other social software platforms. He has published over 80 academic articles, and he has over 20 patents. His top 9 publications have over 200 citations each.

=== "A Framework for Information Visualization Spreadsheets" ===
Chi's dissertation, titled, "A Framework for Information Visualization Spreadsheets", was chaired by John T. Riedl. The dissertation was an early example of the power of small multiples in information visualizations. During this time, he was awarded a University of Minnesota Graduate School Doctoral Dissertation Fellowship, Research Contribution Award, Doctoral Dissertation Award, and Best Teaching Award.

=== Academic work ===
Chi has chaired top conferences and publishes regularly in top-tier academic conferences in computer science and human-computer interaction related fields. His work has been covered in various newspapers and magazines around the world, including The Economist, Time, Los Angeles Times, Technology Review, and Wired.

While at PARC, Chi published a paper analyzing edits to Wikipedia, looking at content contributed vs the author's edit count.

In 2012, Chi served as the technical program co-chair for CHI, the most prestigious academic conference in the field of HCI.

== Recognition ==
Chi was elected to the CHI Academy in 2018. He was named to the 2022 class of ACM Fellows, "for contributions to machine learning and data mining techniques for social computing and recommender systems".

In 2023, he was awarded the Distinguished Alumni award by the University of Minnesota Computer Science department.

== Selected publications ==
- Chi, Ed Huai-hsin, ed. A Framework for Visualizing Information. Vol. 1. Springer Science & Business Media, 2002.

Articles, a selection:

- Chi, Ed H. "A taxonomy of visualization techniques using the data state reference model". Information Visualization, 2000. InfoVis 2000. IEEE Symposium On. IEEE, 2000.
- Chi, Ed H., et al. "Using information scent to model user information needs and actions and the Web". Proceedings of the SIGCHI Conference On Human Factors in Computing Systems. ACM, 2001.
- Kittur, A., Suh, B., Pendleton, B. A., & Chi, E. H. (April 2007). "He says, she says: conflict and coordination in Wikipedia". In Proceedings of the SIGCHI Conference On Human Factors in Computing Systems (pp. 453–462). ACM.
- Kittur, Aniket, Ed H. Chi, and Bongwon Suh. "Crowdsourcing user studies with Mechanical Turk". Proceedings of the SIGCHI Conference On Human Factors in Computing Systems. ACM, 2008.
- Suh, B., Hong, L., Pirolli, P., & Chi, E. H. (2010, August). "Want to be Retweeted? Large Scale Analytics on Factors Impacting Retweet in Twitter Network". In Social Computing (Socialcom), 2010 IEEE Second International Conference On (pp. 177–184). IEEE.
