= Philipp Schloter =

Businessman and CEO of Abukai

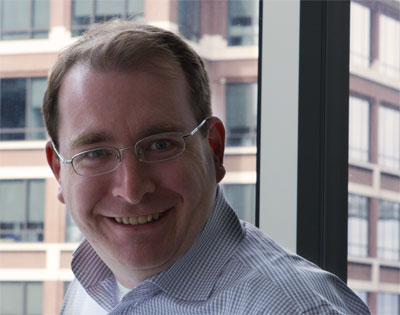
- Education: Stanford University
- Occupation: Business executive
- Known for: President & CEO of Abukai

Philipp Schloter is a business executive who is president and CEO of Abukai, a supplier of business productivity software, named one of the top 20 cloud services by PC Magazine and named "Instagram for Expense Reports" by Wireless Week.

Before Abukai, Schloter worked at Microsoft, Deutsche Telekom and he held the position of general manager at Nokia, leading a growth business unit based on the acquired business. Awards included a Wall Street Journal Innovation Award, a Stevie Award for "Marketing Campaign of the Year," and a Digital Emmy Nomination. Schloter was founder and chief executive officer of PIXTO, a visual search company, which Nokia acquired.

Schloter attended Stanford University, where he earned a BA in economics, BS in computer science and MS in electrical engineering. Schloter has been awarded over 20 patents.
