= Net Perceptions =

Software company

- Type: Private company
- Industry: Software
- Founded: 1996
- Founders: Steven Snyder, John T. Riedl, Joseph A. Konstan, Brad Miller, David Gardiner
- Headquarters: Edina, Minnesota, United States
- Key people: Warren B. Kanders

Net Perceptions was an American software company that was the leading seller of personalization technology during the Internet boom of the late 1990s. It was based in Edina, Minnesota. One of their first customers was Amazon.

The company's software was designed to increase new and repeat business by using data to learn about a customer's individual needs and preferences and then making personalized product and service recommendations to them.

== History ==
In the Summer of 1996, David Gardiner, a former Ph.D. student of John Riedl, introduced Riedl to Steven Snyder. Snyder had been an early employee at Microsoft, but had left Microsoft to come to Minnesota to do a Ph.D. in Psychology. He realized the commercial potential of collaborative filtering, and encouraged the team to found a company in April 1996. By June, Gardiner, Snyder, Miller, Riedl, and Konstan incorporated their company, and by July had their first round of funding, from Hummer Winblad Venture Partners. Net Perceptions went on to be one of the leading companies in personalization during the Internet boom of the late 1990s, went public on March 29, 2000 offering 2,000,000 shares of common stock, resulting in net proceeds to the company of $84.8 million, with 26,297,863 outstanding shares, had 400 employees and stock at $60 per share, and acquired marketing services startup KD1 for $126 million. Then over time the stock lost 95 percent of its value, and it laid off most employees. The company was delisted from the NASDAQ September 3, 2004, and returned about $40 million to stockholders that same year.

=== Move to Connecticut ===
In 2004, Kanders & Co. bought the remnants of the company and moved it to Greenwich, Connecticut "to build a diversified, global industrial products group."
