= Informavore =

Term used for an organism that consumes information

The term informavore (also spelled informivore) characterizes an organism that consumes information. It is meant to be a description of human behavior in modern information society, in comparison to omnivore, as a description of humans consuming food. George A. Miller coined the term in 1983 as an analogy to how organisms survive by consuming negative entropy (as suggested by Erwin Schrödinger). Miller states, "Just as the body survives by ingesting negative entropy, so the mind survives by ingesting information. In a very general sense, all higher organisms are informavores."

An early use of the term was in a newspaper article by Jonathan Chevreau where he quotes a speech made by Zenon Pylyshyn. Soon after, the term appeared in the introduction of Pylyshyn's seminal book on Cognitive Science, Computation and Cognition.

More recently the term has been popularized by philosopher Daniel Dennett in his book Kinds of Minds and by cognitive scientist Steven Pinker.
