= Information needs =

Desire to satisfy a conscious or unconscious need

In information science, library science, and information retrieval, an information need is a person's gap in knowledge leading to a description of information they lack. It is closely related to relevance: if something is relevant for a person in relation to a given task, the person needs the information for that task.

Information needs are related to, but distinct from information requirements. They are studied for:

1. The explanation of observed phenomena of information use or expressed need;
2. The prediction of instances of information uses;
3. The control and thereby improvement of the utilization of information manipulation of essential conditions.

== Background ==
The concept of information needs was coined by Robert S. Taylor, an American information journalist, in a 1962 article "The Process of Asking Questions".

In this paper, Taylor attempted to describe how an inquirer obtains an answer from an information system, by performing the process consciously or unconsciously; also he studied the reciprocal influence between the inquirer and a given system.

According to Taylor, information need has four levels:

1. The conscious and unconscious need for information not existing in the remembered experience of the investigator. In terms of the query range, this level might be called the "ideal question" — the question which would bring from the ideal system exactly what the inquirer, if he could state his need. It is the actual, but unexpressed, need for information
2. The conscious mental description of an ill-defined question. In this level, the inquirer has a conscious information need in the mind and might talk to someone else in the field to get an answer.
3. A researcher forms a rational statement of his question. This statement is a rational and unambiguous description of the inquirer's doubts.
4. The question as presented to the information system.

There are variables within a system that influence the question and its formation. Taylor divided them into five groups: general aspects (physical and geographical factors); system input (What type of material is put into the system, and what is the unit item?); internal organization (classification, indexing, subject heading, and similar access schemes); question input (what part do human operators play in the total system?); output (interim feedback).

Herbert Menzel preferred demand studies to preference studies. Requests for information or documents that were actually made by scientists in the course of their activities form the data for demand studies. Data may be in the form of records of orders placed for bibliographics, calls for books from an interlibrary loan system, or inquires addressed to an information center or service. Menzel also investigated user study and defined information seeking behaviour from three angles:

1. When approached from the point of view of the scientist or technologists, these are studies of scientists' communication behaviour;
2. When approached from the point of view of any communication medium, they are use studies;
3. When approached from the science communication system, they are studies in the flow of information among scientists and technologists.

William J. Paisley moved from information needs/uses toward strong guidelines for information system. He studied the theories of information-processing behavior that will generate propositions concerning channel selection; amount of seeking; effects on productivity of information quality, quantity, currency, and diversity; the role of motivational and personality factors, etc. He investigated a concentric conceptual framework for user research. In the framework, he places the information users at the centre of ten systems, which are:

1. The scientist within his culture.
2. The scientist within a political system.
3. The scientist within a membership group.
4. The scientist within a reference group.
5. The scientist within an invisible college.
6. The scientist within a formal organization.
7. The scientist within a work team.
8. The scientist within his own head.
9. The scientist within a legal/economical system.
10. The scientist within a formal.

== Critical Information Needs (CIN) ==
"In 2012, the University of Southern California was funded by the Federal Communications Commission to examine a wide range of social sciences from multiple disciplines to propose a set of critical information needs," according to Friedland. He continued, "USC reached out to a team of scholars collectively identified as the Communications Policy Research Network (CPRN). ... CPRN found that communities need access to eight categories of critical information ...:

1. Emergencies and risks, both immediate and long-term;
2. Health and welfare, including specifically local health information as well as group-specific health information where it exists.
3. Education, including the quality of local schools and choices available to parents;
4. Transportation, including available alternatives, costs, and schedules;
5. Economic opportunities, including job information, job training, and small business assistance;
6. The environment, including information about air and water quality; environmental threats to health; and access to restoration and recreation;
7. Civic information, including information on civic institutions and opportunities to associate with others;
8. Political information, including information about candidates at all relevant levels of local governance, and about relevant public policy initiatives affecting communities and neighborhoods."

== See also ==
- Information retrieval
- Needs
