= Reverse telephone directory =

Service allowing users to search by telephone number

A reverse telephone directory (also known as a gray pages directory, criss-cross directory or reverse phone lookup) is a collection of telephone numbers and associated customer details. However, unlike a standard telephone directory, where the user uses customer's details (such as name and address) in order to retrieve the telephone number of that person or business, a reverse telephone directory allows users to search by a telephone service number in order to retrieve the customer details for that service.

Reverse telephone directories are used by law enforcement and other emergency services in order to determine the origin of any request for assistance, however these systems include both publicly accessible (listed) and private (unlisted) services. As such, these directories are restricted to internal use only. Some forms of city directories provide this form of lookup for listed services by phone number, along with address cross-referencing.

Publicly accessible reverse telephone directories may be provided as part of the standard directory services from the telecommunications carrier in some countries. In other countries these directories are often created by phone phreakers by collecting the information available via the publicly accessible directories and then providing a search function which allows users to search by the telephone service details.

== History ==
Printed reverse phone directories have been produced by the telephone companies (in the United States) for decades, and were distributed to the phone companies, law enforcement, and public libraries. In the early 1990s, businesses started offering reverse telephone lookups for fees, and by the early 2000s advertising-based reverse directories were available online, prompting occasional controversies revolving around privacy.

== Australia ==
In 2001, a legal case Telstra Corporation Ltd v Desktop Marketing Systems Pty Ltd was heard in the Australian Federal Court. It gave Telstra, the predominant carrier within Australia and the maintainer of the publicly accessible White Pages (residential) and Yellow Pages (commercial) directories, copyright over the content of these directories.

In February 2010 a Federal Court of Australia case Telstra Corporation Ltd v Phone Directories Company Pty Ltd determined that Telstra does not hold copyright in the White Pages or the Yellow Pages.

== United States ==
In United States, landline phone subscribers can pay a small fee to exclude their number from the directory, depending on the service provider. This service is available as an unlisted number, or an unpublished number. An unlisted number is excluded from public directories. An unpublished number is also excluded from directory assistance services, such as 411. Landline telephone companies often charge a monthly fee for this service.

As cellular phones become more popular, there have been plans to release cell phone numbers into public 411 and reverse number directories via a separate Wireless telephone directory. However, these plans have come under opposition from internet based privacy advocate groups, and blogs, often citing privacy concerns.

Opposition to the wireless 411 directory was led by consumer advocacy organization Consumers Union. At the time of their campaign; they cited both privacy, and control of out of pocket costs, as reasons for their opposition. In their 2004 congressional testimony supporting the (S. 1963, the "Wireless 411 Privacy Act" 9/2004) bill, Consumers Union claimed that "consumer privacy could be jeopardized by a wireless 411 directory".

From 2008 to 2010, Google provided a custom search operator called Google Phonebook which allowed a user to search for a phone number directly within the Google search bar. This feature has since been removed entirely due to privacy concerns.

Several information companies provide reverse cell phone lookups that are obtained from various resources, and are available online. Because there is no central database of cell phone numbers, reverse phone directories that claim to be free cannot return accurate information on those numbers, or tend to include only partial data related to the phone number subscriber.

== United Kingdom ==
In the United Kingdom proper, reverse directory information is not publicly available. In the Channel Islands it is provided in the printed telephone directories.

Although the information is, of necessity, available to emergency services, for other agencies it is treated as 'communication data' in the RIPA regime and subject to the same controls as requests for lists of and content of calls.
