= Brenda Dervin =

American academic

- Born: Brenda Louise Dervin; November 20, 1938; Beverly, Massachusetts
- Died: December 31, 2022 (aged 84); Seattle, Washington
- Citizenship: United States
- Education: Cornell University (B.A.); Michigan State University (M.S.); Michigan State University (Ph.D.)
- Occupations: Professor, researcher, educator, consultant
- Writing career
- Language: English
- Subjects: Communication, Library and Information Science
- Notable works: Sense-Making Methodology Reader, Rethinking Communication, Progress in Communication Sciences
- Notable awards: Honorary Doctorate in Social Sciences, University of Helsinki

Brenda Dervin (November 20, 1938–December 31, 2022) was an American communication theorist who developed the sense-making methodology. She was Professor Emerita in the School of Communication at the Ohio State University. Dervin worked primarily in the fields of communication and library and information science. Her research on information seeking and use led to the development of the sensemaking methodology. Her 1986 article, "Information Needs and Uses," in the Annual Review of Information Science and Technology is considered as a seminal work and a classic citation.

== Education and career ==
Dervin was born in Beverly, Massachusetts on November 20, 1938. She received her B.S. in Journalism and Home Economics from Cornell University, with a minor in Philosophy of Religion, and her M.S. and Ph.D. in Communication Research from Michigan State University. Since her childhood, she had always been interested in what dialogue was and how people talked and (mis)understood one another. Dervin made the following remark about dialogue in one of the interviews about her career:

I think dialogue is when we bridge the gaps between us with this thing called communicating: both nonverbal and verbal language, and all the other things that are communicating. Dialogue occurs when we reach for a deeper understanding of the other, which may be the same as us or different from us, or that dichotomy may be irrelevant. Dialogue is about hearing another on their own terms, without positioning them as the other. They do not need you to understand them, except from their own interpretive framework. You listen—really listen—to them. Help them see that they are not alone.

Dervin served on the faculty of the School of Library and Information Sciences at Syracuse University and the School of Communication at the University of Washington before joining the Department of Communication at Ohio State University in 1986. She retired from the Ohio State University in 2012 and moved back to Seattle, Washington. Throughout her career, Dervin published 23 books and authored 124 articles and book chapters. She delivered lectures at numerous universities in the United States and elsewhere.

In 1986, Dervin became the first female president of the International Communication Association (ICA). Her presidential address was about feminist contributions to communication studies. She organized and coordinated the 1985 ICA Annual Convention in Honolulu, Hawaii. She made the convention theme "Beyond Polemics: Paradigm Dialogues" and invited Anthony Giddens and Stuart Hall to the conference. She was Editor of Progress in Communication Sciences for 14 years and was on editorial boards of many communication and library and information science journals. In 2000, she was awarded an Honorary Doctorate in Social Sciences from the University of Helsinki. Her last 2-hour video interview was recorded in September 2021. She died in Seattle on December 31, 2022.

== Publications ==
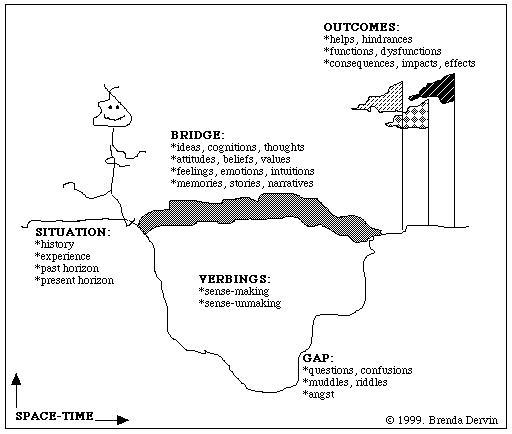
Dr. Dervins original artwork of the Sense-Making Metaphor

- Dervin, B. (1987). The potential contribution of feminist scholarship to the field of communication. Journal of Communication, 37(4), 107–120. https://doi.org/10.1111/j.1460-2466.1987.tb01011.x
- Dervin, B. (1991). Comparative theory reconceptualized: From entities and states to processes and dynamics. Communication Theory, 1(1), 59–69. https://doi.org/10.1111/j.1468-2885.1991.tb00005.x
- Dervin, B. (1993). Verbing communication: Mandate for disciplinary invention. Journal of Communication, 43(3), 45–54. https://doi.org/10.1111/j.1460-2466.1993.tb01275.x
- Dervin, B. (2003). Audience as listener and learner, teacher and confidante: The sense-making approach. In B. Dervin, L. Foreman-Wernet, & E. Launterbach (Eds.), Sense-making methodology reader: Selected writings of Brenda Dervin (pp. 215–231). Hampton Press.
- Dervin, B. (2003). Information as non-sense; information as sense: The communication technology connection. In B. Dervin, L. Foreman-Wernet, & E. Launterbach (Eds.), Sense-making methodology reader: Selected writings of Brenda Dervin (pp. 293–308). Hampton Press.
- Dervin, B. (2005). The PHILCOMM division of ICA as seen from the margins by a formerly fem-us rebellious ragamuffn: A personal refection. The Communication Review, 8(4), 415–421. https://doi.org/10.1080/10714420500297599
- Dervin, B. (Ed.). (2006). The strengths of our methodological divides: Five navigators, their struggles and successes [Special section]. Keio Communication Review, 28, 5–52.
- Dervin, B. (2015). Dervin’s sense-making as theory, meta-theory, methodology, and method. In A. Nasser & A. Saif (Eds.), Understanding information science: Twenty key theories (pp. 59–80). IGI Global.
- Dervin, B., Grossberg, L., O’Keefe, B. J., & Wartella, E. (Eds.). (1989). Rethinking communication: Vol. 1. Paradigm issues. Sage.
- Dervin, B., Grossberg, L., O’Keefe, B. J., & Wartella, E. (Eds.). (1989). Rethinking communication: Vol. 2. Paradigm exemplars. Sage.
