= Peter Pirolli =

American computer scientist

Peter Pirolli is a senior research scientist at the Institute for Human and Machine Cognition (IHMC). His research involves a mix of cognitive science, artificial intelligence, and human-computer interaction, with applications in digital health, sensemaking, and information foraging, among other things. Previously he was at the Palo Alto Research Center and he was a tenured professor in the school of education at the University of California Berkeley in the Education, Math, Science and Technology Department (EMST).

His most well-known work is the development of Information foraging theory with Stuart Card. He is also known for seminal work on sensemaking by intelligence analysts, also with Stuart Card. His recent work has focused on computational predictive models of healthy habit formation in mobile health.

He received his doctorate in cognitive psychology from Carnegie Mellon University in 1985, and a B.Sc. in psychology and anthropology from Trent University.

He is a Fellow of the National Academy of Inventors (NAI), the American Association for the Advancement of Science (AAAS), the American Psychological Association (APA), the Association for Psychological Science (APS), the National Academy of Education (NAE), and the ACM Computer-Human Interaction Academy.
