= Tellme Networks =

American telecommunications company

Tellme Networks, Inc.
- Type: subsidiary of Microsoft
- Industry: Telecommunication
- Founded: 1999
- Headquarters: Mountain View, California
- Key people: Mike McCue, Chief executive
- Products: Telephone services and applications
- Number of employees: 360 (2008)

Tellme Networks, Inc. was an American company founded in 1999 by Mike McCue and Angus Davis, which specialized in telephone-based applications. Its headquarters were in Mountain View, California.

Tellme Networks was acquired by Microsoft on March 14, 2007, for approximately $800 million; the deal closed in late April 2007. In 2006, Tellme's phone network processed more than 2 billion unique calls.

Tellme established an information number which provided time-of-day announcements, weather forecasts, brief news and sports summaries, business searches, stock market quotations, driving directions, and similar amenities. Operating by voice prompts and speech-recognition software, it was set up in 2000 as a loss-leader service to demonstrate the Tellme functionality to U.S. consumers. The voice of the Tellme service is Darby Bailey.

In early 2012, Microsoft divested itself of Tellme Networks' interactive voice response (IVR) service and the majority of its employees to 24/7 Inc. The service was moved to a non-toll-free number.

== History ==
In April 1999, the Tellme founding team, consisting of Mike McCue, Angus Davis, Rod Brathwaite, Jim Fanning, Kyle Sims, Brad Porter, Michael Plitkins, Hadi Partovi, John Giannandrea, Andrew Volkmann, Anthony Accardi, Patrick McCormick, Danny Howard, Vicki Penrose, and Emil Michael assembled in Mountain View, California.

In 2000, Tellme announced a service that delivered content to telephones—a concept called voice portals. Early competitors included TelSurf Networks, BeVocal, Hey Anita, and Quack.com. Quack.com was founded in 1999 and acquired in September 2000 by America Online for its competing service, AOLbyPhone. At least ten additional competitors appeared in 2000 in various attempts to mimic the funding success of Tellme.

Tellme was also featured in the 2001 documentary Wild at Start. and was referenced in a 2000 Malcolm Gladwell article in The New Yorker about recruiting.

In 2008 the company debuted a feature especially for Christmas Eve; callers can hear recorded messages from Santa Claus. If called on Christmas Eve, Santa will say what state he is traveling over, and exactly what he is doing. In 2009 they added a service that allows you to receive messages from Santa a week early which explain what he is doing to prepare for Christmas.

At the onset of service, as a way to gain more users, they offered a free long-distance call feature called Phone Booth. Callers would call Tellme and were given 2 free minutes of long-distance call time to their desired phone number. That service was later stopped while other services persisted.

== Services ==
Voice portal customers build Internet-powered, voice-enabled applications on the Tellme Network using Tellme Studio. Tellme Studio is a web-based VoiceXML development tool. The Tellme platform is based on open standards like VoiceXML, CCXML, and VoIP. The Tellme Voice Portal which includes directory assistance used to be accessed by calling (800) 555-TELL (8355). When Microsoft sold Tellme to 24/7 Inc in 2012, the number changed to the non-toll-free (408) 752-8052, rebranded as The Information Line. In September 2019, the service was revamped and rebranded again as Voice Info, with once again a toll-free number (866) 895-3124, however this number was deactivated in July 2020. The old Microsoft Bing 411 1-800-CALL-411 number can now be used to access Voice Info by pressing 9 when connected. AT&T Wireless customers can access Voice Info directly by dialing *8 (formerly #121).

== Customers ==
Some of the services running on Tellme's network include directory assistance (4-1-1) for AT&T and Verizon (landline), AT&T's Voice Info (*8), customer service for Merrill Lynch, E*TRADE Financial, American Airlines, and e-commerce services for Fandango.

== See also ==
- List of speech recognition software
