= Bing Mobile =

Web search for mobile devices

- Bing for mobile application on Windows Phone 7
- Developer: Microsoft
- Stable release: 5.1.2010.5040 / November 5, 2010; 16 years ago
- Operating system: Windows Phone, Windows Mobile, BlackBerry OS, iOS, BREW, Android, T-Mobile Sidekick, Series 30+, Series 40, Nokia Asha platform
- Type: Web search engine, map application
- License: Freeware (Ad-supported)
- Website: m.bing.com

Bing for mobile (formerly Live Search Mobile) is a search tool for handheld mobile devices from Microsoft as part of their Bing search engine. It is designed for mobile device displays. Bing Mobile is built into Windows Mobile and Windows Phone as proprietary software, accessed via the Search key on Windows Phone 7 and Windows Phone 8 devices. It is also available on Windows Phone 8.1 (and integrated with Microsoft Cortana where available), and can be downloaded for other platforms, including Android.

== Windows Phone ==
With the launch of Windows Phone, the new operating system included the Bing Hub, a centralised hub for contextual web searches and Bing Maps for navigation built-in which gained some additional features such as showing users real-time traffic updates, street-view photos, 3D graphics, and directions. To make Windows Phone hardware more uniform Microsoft requires all Windows Phones feature a dedicated "Search button" that opens up Bing Mobile.

With Windows Phone 7.5, the first major update to Windows Phone Microsoft included several new features to the Bing Hub including the new Bing Vision application that allows users to scan QR Codes, books, price tags, and various other items but unlike Google Goggles, can not scan any object due to its limited functionality, other than scanning objects Bing Vision comes with a built-in version of the Bing Translator that can scan texts and translate it into the phone's language, Engadget did a test they scanned the back cover a book and it only picked up about 90 percent of the words in the summary after the text was found, Bing Vision's translation feature supports 26 languages. Bing Maps also received new features namely the Bing Local Scout which takes a look at businesses around the user's location and gives them a list of local restaurants, bars, and shopping centres. The Bing Hub can also open up Bing Local Scout and got a new feature added in Windows Phone 7.5 called Bing Audio, a service similar to Shazam which can recognise songs and show the album in the Zune Marketplace. A notable difference between the Bing Hub and the website is the lack of Bing Travel.

With the launch of Windows Phone 8, Microsoft did not include any major updates to the Bing Hub, but Microsoft later included a new Bing suite of applications. Bing News a customisable news aggregator which features headlines and videos of breaking news and allows users to track specific story categories, topics, or news sources. Bing Sports which shows sports headlines and games featuring 8 categories: recent scores, top sports headlines, videos, photos, schedules, standings, and statistics. Bing Weather which in up-to-date conditions, temperature, precipitation, and wind. And Bing Finance which showcases financial news, market information, currency conversion rates, stock option updates, and customisable interactive charts for American markets. Subsequently, Microsoft launched Bing Travel, Bing Food & Drink, and Bing Health & Fitness applications which alongside the original suite of mobile apps were all rebranded under the MSN brand in 2014.

In Windows Phone 8.1 Microsoft introduced Cortana to select markets, Cortana is an intelligent personal assistant built on top of the Bing Hub's Microsoft TellMe voice features. Cortana responds to a set of commands such as setting alarms, reminders, making suggestions based on the user's daily habits and frequented places, notify about the weather, turn up the latest headlines and news on the user's personal interests, a "do not disturb me" feature named Quiet hours which can set exceptions for contacts in the user's inner circle, predict sports events and tell jokes. For users who enabled Cortana Bing Audio/Bing Music remains included built into Cortana's Hub but Bing Vision becomes only accessible via the Microsoft Camera by selecting lenses. A common criticism against Cortana is that it does not understand or respond to queries as well as other digital assistants does and will open up a Bing search result when it does not understand the question. Exclusive to Microsoft Lumia devices with the Lumia Denim update is the "Hey Cortana" feature which allows users to open Cortana with voice activation while their Windows Phone is in standby mode.

== Features ==
=== Bing for mobile browser - m.bing.com ===
Mobile browsing allows users to access Bing on their mobile devices through WAP or GPRS connection. The interface is optimized for viewing on mobile handsets. Users can:

- Search the web for information
- Get news information
- Find local businesses in the user's local area
- Get maps and driving directions
- Get answers to questions
- In the UK and Japan - "Find My Location" to pinpoint a user's location
- Share content via the Facebook or Twitter

In the U.S. on HTML-ready mobile devices such as iPhone, Android, and touch-screen Windows phones, further features are available such as automatic location detection (geolocation), suggested local listings based on location and time of day, the ability to save listings to Favorites, and send that list to friends, cinematic listings with clips and trailers, and sports scores and stats, with real-time updates during games.

=== Bing for mobile application ===
The Mobile Application is available as a Java ME application for non-Windows phones, as a richer .NET Framework application for Windows Phones, and as an application for BlackBerry OS, Android, iOS, and Binary Runtime Environment for Wireless (BREW). It provides local listings, maps (road and aerial satellite), driving directions, and traffic conditions. Other features include:

- Predictive text input
- Browse and search through business categories
- Image search and image exploration
- Speech recognition search input
- Search results include a phone number and address; users may click to call for an immediate connection
- Send search results to others using SMS
- Find maps for specific addresses
- Get directions to and from a destination
- Get turn by turn directions using a GPS receiver
- View traffic information for major roads in selected cities
- Get weather forecasts
- View movie showtimes and theaters
- Turn-by-turn navigation for Windows 6.x phones.
- A hub in Windows Phone 7.x and later devices.
- For Android it includes a built-in browser
- Bing Rewards
- The ability to set the device's lock screen based on Bing's daily images.

The Bing app is available in the U.S. on a variety of Windows phones, Android platform devices, all BlackBerry devices, several BREW devices, iPhone and iPod Touch, and Sidekick devices.

In April 2015 Microsoft redesigned the Google Android and iOS versions of Bing Mobile and implemented several new "cards" such as the "image of the day card" which shows Bing's rotating images and additional information, the "popular now card" which contains information on the most popular searched items of that day, a "Bing Rewards card" which shows the user's Bing Rewards points and serves as a central hub for Bing's search settings, a "Settings card" where users can alter their Safe Search filter and change what content they can see and which content they do not want to see, and a "Footer card" which gives users the ability to send feedback to Microsoft.

== iOS ==
The Bing app for iOS (iPhone, iPod Touch, iPad) includes these further features:

- Barcode and cover art scanning
- Enhanced product listings
- Social updates from Facebook and Twitter
- Social search - see results from social network alongside web results
- Share search results on Facebook, Twitter, or through email
- Weather - get information about local and international weather
- Trending - see what news is trending in the world
- Image Match - upload an image and get results for similar looking images
- Sharing options through various messaging applications like WeChat and WhatsApp

== Bing 411 ==
In the United States, Microsoft operated a toll-free number (1-800-BING-411 or 1-800-CALL-411) for directory assistance called Bing 411. This service was identical, except for the opening message, with the voice search service powered by Tellme on 1-800-555-TELL. Users were able to find local shops and restaurants and obtain driving directions, traffic reports, sports scores, stock quotes, news, and weather reports through this service. Service on 1-800-BING-411 and 1-800-555-TELL was discontinued on June 1, 2012. The 1-800-CALL-411 number was discontinued a few months later.

1-800-CALL-411 has resurfaced in recent times. The number first tells you to press 9 for directory assistance. This transfers you to AT&T Wireless's "Voice Info" service, an ad supported voice search service still apparently powered by Tellme, that is normally accessed by AT&T Wireless customers by dialing *8 (formerly #121).

== See also ==
- Microsoft Cortana
- Windows Live
- Bing Audio
- Bing Vision
- MSN Mobile
