= Slate (disambiguation) =

Slate is a type of rock, often used for roofing.

Slate, SLATE, or Slates may also refer to:

== Places ==
- Slate, Kansas, a ghost town in the United States
- Slate, Virginia, an unincorporated community in the United States
- Slate, West Virginia, an unincorporated community in the United States
- Slate Run, a tributary of Pine Creek in Pennsylvania

== People ==
- Slate (surname)

== Arts and communication ==
- Slate (magazine), an online publication
- "Slate", a song by Jay Farrar on 1993 Uncle Tupelo album Anodyne
- Slates (EP), by The Fall, 1981
- Slate (writing), a board for writing on
- Slate board (clapperboard), a device used during film production
- Slate (broadcasting), a title card listing important metadata of a television program
- Slate and stylus, tools used by blind persons to write and read
- Slate (typeface), a neo-grotesque typeface
- Slate gray, a color

== Government and politics ==
- Slate (elections), a group of candidates in a multi-seat or multi-position election
- SLATE (1958–1966), a campus political party at the University of California, Berkeley

== Computing ==
- Slate phone, a smartphone form factor with few buttons if any
- Slate tablet, a tablet computer form factor
  - Microsoft Tablet PC § Slate, a brand of Windows tablet without dedicated keyboards
  - HP Slate, a line of Windows and Android tablet computers and similar devices by Hewlett-Packard
  - Pixel Slate, a Google ChromeOS tablet computer
  - Meebox Slate, a brand of Windows tablet PCs

== Other uses ==
- Slate Auto, an American electric vehicle manufacturer
  - Slate Truck, a pickup truck produced by the manufacturer
- Slate turkey, a breed of domestic fowl

== See also ==
- Magic Slate
- Slate Creek (disambiguation)
