= Rick Osterloh =

American technology executive

- Education: Stanford University (MA)
- Occupations: Senior Vice President of Devices & Services at Google
- Website: https://blog.google/authors/rick-osterloh/

Rick Osterloh is an American executive and the Senior Vice President of Devices & Services at Google. He manages the business units responsible for developing Pixel, Google Nest, and Fitbit devices. Osterloh's professional journey includes roles such as the President of Motorola Mobility and Vice President of Product and Design at Skype. Furthermore, he served on the Board of Directors of First Republic Bank before its acquisition by JPMorgan Chase.

== Education ==
Rick Osterloh earned bachelor's and master's degrees in industrial engineering and completed an MBA at Stanford University.

== Career ==
His career commenced at Amazon.com as a product manager, following which he contributed to product development and strategy at Good Technology, a mobile security company. Osterloh later transitioned to Skype and led the software and hardware product development. In 2012, he joined Motorola Mobility and held various positions, culminating in his role as President, overseeing the design, engineering, and marketing of smartphones, tablets, and wearables. His return to Google in 2016 marked the establishment of a new hardware division unifying various projects, including Chromebook, Chromecast, Google Home, and Google Pixel. He supervised the acquisition of HTC's smartphone design team in 2017, and the acquisition of Fitbit in 2020. In 2024, Rick Osterloh was put in charge of Google's new Platforms and Devices team. The team is in charge of ensuring continuity between Pixel, Nest, Android, and Chrome.

Osterloh played a significant role in the development and launch of various Google products, including the Pixel 2, Pixel 3, Pixel 4, Pixel 5, Pixel 6, Pixelbook, Pixel Slate, Pixelbook Go, Nest Hub, Nest Hub Max, Nest Mini, Nest Audio, Nest Wifi, Nest Thermostat, Nest Hello, Nest Cam, Nest Protect, Nest Secure, Stadia, and Pixel Buds.
