= Pixel Tablet =

2023 Android tablet developed by Google

- Diagram of the Pixel Tablet
- Developer: Google
- Product family: Google Pixel
- Type: Tablet
- Released: June 20, 2023; 3 years ago
- Lifespan: 2023-2026
- Introductory price: $399 (128GB, tablet only), $499 (256GB, tablet only), $499 (128 GB, tablet + dock), $599 (256 GB, tablet + dock)
- Discontinued: September 10, 2026; 5 days ago
- Operating system: Android 13; Upgradable to Android 17
- System on a chip: Google Tensor G2
- Memory: 8 GB LPDDR5 RAM
- Storage: 128/256 GB UFS 3.1 non-expandable
- Connectivity: Wi-Fi 6 (802.11 a/b/g/n/ac/ax) + MIMO; Bluetooth 5.2; Ultra-wideband chip; Google Cast
- Power: 27 Wh rechargeable battery, Power Delivery over USB-C
- Dimensions: 258 mm (10.2 in) × 169 mm (6.7 in) × 8.1 mm (0.3 in)
- Weight: 493 g (17.39 oz)
- Website: Pixel Tablet; Pixel Tablet Specs

The Pixel Tablet was an Android tablet designed, developed, and marketed by Google as part of the Google Pixel product line. It was previewed at the Google I/O keynote in May 2022 and was shown again at the 2022 Made by Google event and announced during Google I/O on May 10, 2023 alongside the Pixel 7a and the Pixel Fold. It was released in June 2023. At launch, a charging speaker dock was sold with each device. However, a standalone version without the dock was released on May 14, 2024.

== History ==
In June 2019, Google told Business Insider and Computerworld that its hardware division would no longer develop tablets, following the lackluster reception to the ChromeOS-powered Pixel Slate tablet introduced the previous year. Production was halted on a successor to the Pixel Slate as well as two unannounced tablets, with the company refocusing its attention on the Pixelbook laptop series. In March 2022, 9to5Google reported that the company was developing a Google Assistant–powered smart display similar to the Nest Hub with a detachable tablet-style screen. On May 11, during the 2022 Google I/O keynote, Google unveiled a preview at an upcoming Pixel-branded Android tablet powered by the Google Tensor system-on-chip (SoC), to be released the following year. The tablet was certified by the Universal Stylus Initiative later that month, indicating support for stylus pens. Google officially announced the Pixel Tablet at the 2022 Made by Google event on October 6. In April 2023, the Pixel Tablet was approved by the Federal Communications Commission. Google revealed additional details about the device during the annual Google I/O keynote on May 10, 2023.

== Specifications ==
=== Design ===
Google shared a very brief look at the Pixel Tablet at the Google I/O 2022 event. The video presents the device's soft, rounded design, including what appears to be a backing made of a matte, soft touch material. In addition, the Pixel Tablet has two cameras – one at the front, and one at the back of the device. It also features two speakers on its right edge and a power button just above the back camera, in the top right corner of the body. Google also mentioned that the Pixel Tablet has a body made out of 100 % recycled aluminum and features a nano-ceramic coating.

=== Hardware ===
The Pixel Tablet ships with a 10.95 in (278 mm) WQXGA LCD at 276 ppi with a 2560 × 1600 pixel resolution and a 16:10 aspect ratio. It contains an 8 megapixel rear camera, and an 8 megapixel front camera. Both cameras can film 1080p video at 30 frames per second.

The Pixel Tablet contains a 27 Wh battery, and can charge at 15 watts using its optional charging dock. It is available with either 128 or 256 GB of storage, and 8 GB of LPDDR5 RAM. The Pixel Tablet contains a Google Tensor G2 processor, and a Titan M2 security module. The Pixel Tablet is also notable for being the first consumer tablet to feature UWB functionality.

=== Software ===
The Pixel Tablet was shipped with Android 13 at launch, and previously supported 3 years of Android version updates and 5 years of security updates. In January 2026, Google changed the update policy to provide 5 years of Android version updates along with security updates for the Pixel Tablet, till June 2028.

== Reception ==
Following the announcement of the Pixel Tablet and Pixel Watch at the 2022 Google I/O, The Verge's Jon Porter opined that Google was taking a subtle approach at Apple's "walled garden" ecosystem strategy, while his colleague Dan Seifert found the tablet's design unattractive and cheap-looking. J. R. Raphael conceded that the tablet did not radiate a "premium" appearance, but speculated that the tablet was more akin to a smart display and concluded that Google may not be seeking to compete with the iPad.
