= Pixelbook Go =

Laptop developed by Google

- Manufacturer: Google
- Product family: Google Pixel
- Type: Chromebook
- Released: October 15, 2019
- Operating system: ChromeOS
- CPU: Intel Core m3-8100Y, i5-8200Y, or i7-8500Y
- Memory: 8 or 16 GB RAM
- Storage: 64, 128, or 256 GB SSD
- Display: 13.3 in (340 mm): 1,920 × 1,080 (FHD) or 3,840 × 2,160 (UHD "Molecular Display") resolution
- Connectivity: 2×USB-C; 1×3.5 mm jack; Wi-Fi 802.11 a/b/g/n/ac; Bluetooth 4.2
- Dimensions: (W×L×H): 206.3 mm × 311.0 mm × 13.4 mm (8.12 in × 12.24 in × 0.53 in)
- Weight: 1.061 kg (2.34 lb) (FHD); 1.090 kg (2.40 lb) (UHD)
- Predecessor: Pixelbook
- Related: Google Pixel Slate
- Website: store.google.com/us/product/pixelbook_go

The Pixelbook Go (codenamed Atlas during development) is a portable touchscreen laptop computer developed by Google which runs ChromeOS. It was announced on October 15, 2019 as the successor to the Pixelbook, and shipments began on October 27 for the United States and Canada. The Pixelbook Go was later made available for the United Kingdom in January 2020.

== History ==
An anonymous Google spokesperson told Computerworld it was "very likely" that a Pixelbook 2 would launch in 2019, when Google announced that it was discontinuing tablet hardware development in June 2019, following the disappointing reception to the Pixel Slate detachable tablet/laptop. A laptop codenamed "Atlas" during development had previously leaked as early as March 2019, and other details were gleaned by examining ChromiumOS source code. Final details, including the name and specifications, were published in September 2019, several weeks prior to the official announcement.

Internally, the new Pixelbook Go used many of the same components as the preceding Pixel Slate. The two devices were developed closely together in 2018; 'Atlas' (the eventual Pixelbook Go laptop) was to be accompanied by 'Meowth' (a convertible tablet), but due to supply chain issues, development of 'Meowth' was discontinued in favor of 'Nocturne' (which eventually became the Pixel Slate).

Preorders were opened the same day as the announcement, October 15, 2019, and shipments for the Pixelbook Go began on October 27. The top-end version with a Core i7 processor was not available to order until December 2019. The Pixelbook Go was made available for the United Kingdom on January 15, 2020.

== Design ==
The Pixelbook Go features a 13.3-inch (340 mm) touchscreen design with an aspect ratio of 16:9; however, with a conventional clamshell hinge, the device cannot be used like a tablet, unlike its predecessor, the Pixelbook. The device also features Google Assistant with a dedicated button. It runs ChromeOS and can launch Android applications natively. The laptop uses a magnesium chassis with an exterior finished in one of two colors, which Google calls "Just Black" and "Not Pink". The bottom chassis has a ribbed structure to aid grip. There is a front-facing camera capable of recording video at 1080p, 60 frames per second.

Either of the computer's two USB-C ports may be used for charging; using the provided 45 W charger, charging for twenty minutes provides up to two hours of use. The 47 Wh battery has a claimed life of 12 hours; the UHD model comes with a larger 56 Wh battery. The Pixelbook drops support for the active stylus Pixelbook Pen.

Pixelbook Go initial pricing and configurations
Processor	RAM	Storage	Graphics	Screen		Price (USD/GBP)
Core m3-8100Y	8 GB	64 GB	Intel UHD 615	13.3 in (340 mm)	1920×1080 (FHD)	US$649 / £629
Core i5-8200Y	8 GB	128 GB	Intel UHD 615	13.3 in (340 mm)	1920×1080 (FHD)	US$849 / £829
Core i5-8200Y	16 GB	128 GB	Intel UHD 615	13.3 in (340 mm)	1920×1080 (FHD)	US$999 / £949
Core i7-8500Y	16 GB	256 GB	Intel UHD 615	13.3 in (340 mm)	3840×2160 (UHD "Molecular Display")	US$1,399 / £1,329

== Response ==
The Pixelbook Go had generally favorable reviews; although the pricing was closer to competing computers than prior Google-branded Chromebooks, some reviewers pointed out that equivalent features and specifications could be purchased from other vendors at or below the cost of a Pixelbook Go.
