= Pixel Slate =

Tablet computer by Google

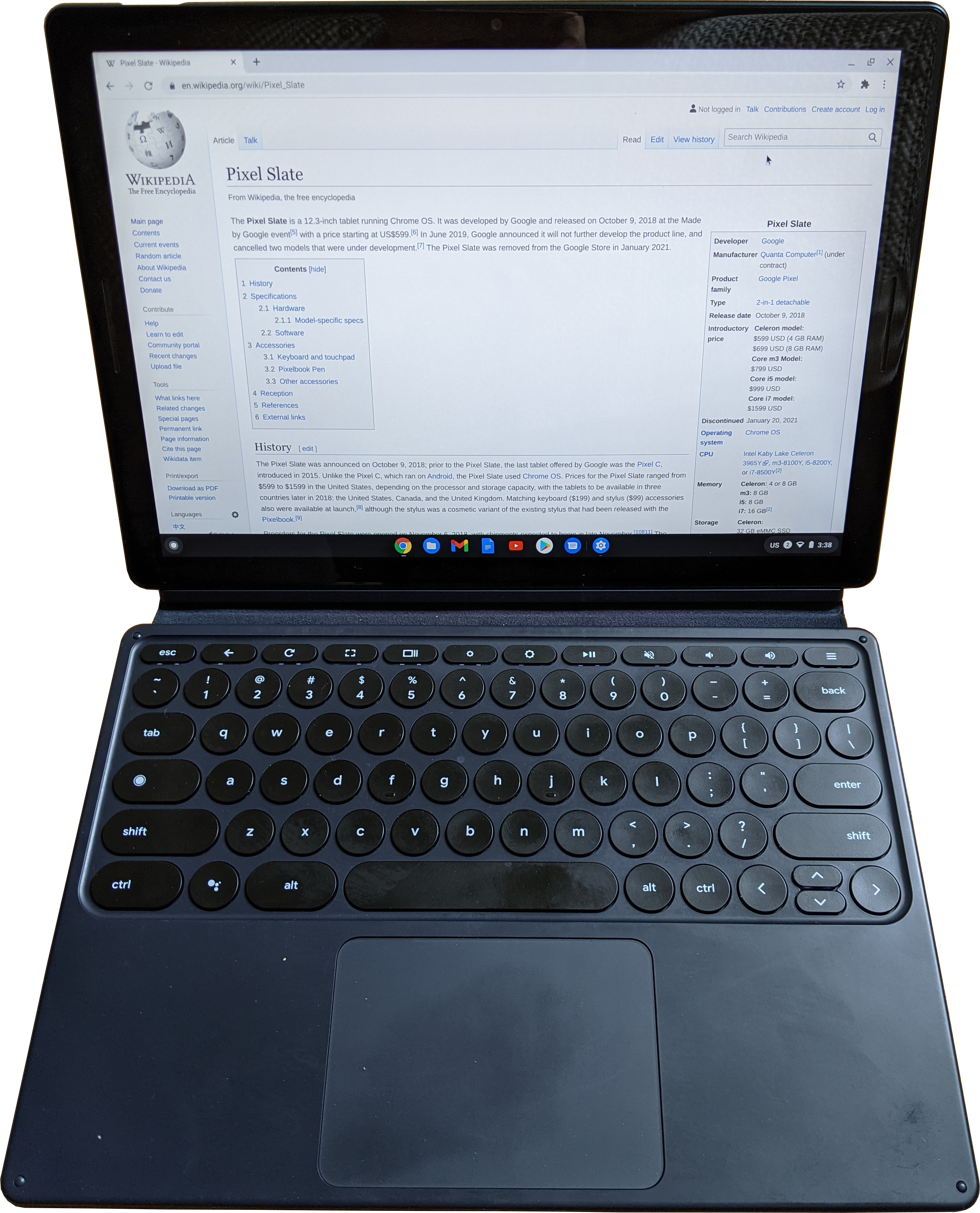
- Pixel Slate with keyboard
- Developer: Google
- Manufacturer: Quanta Computer (under contract)
- Product family: Google Pixel
- Type: 2-in-1 detachable
- Released: October 9, 2018
- Introductory price: Celeron model: $599 USD (4 GB RAM) $699 USD (8 GB RAM); Core m3 Model: $799 USD; Core i5 model: $999 USD; Core i7 model: $1599 USD
- Discontinued: January 20, 2021
- Operating system: Chrome OS
- CPU: Intel Kaby Lake Celeron 3965Y, m3-8100Y, i5-8200Y, or i7-8500Y
- Memory: Celeron: 4 or 8 GB m3: 8 GB i5: 8 GB i7: 16 GB
- Storage: Celeron: 32 GB eMMC SSD; 64 GB eMMC SSD m3: 64 GB eMMC SSD i5: 128 GB eMMC SSD i7: 256 GB eMMC SSD
- Removable storage: USB external storage over USB-C
- Display: 312 mm (12.3 in) Molecular Display 3000×2000 (293 ppi, 115 px/cm) LTPS LCD with Gorilla Glass 5
- Graphics: Intel UHD Graphics 615
- Sound: Stereo dual-coil front-firing speakers, USB-C audio, included USB-C to 3.5mm headphone jack adapter, dual microphones
- Input: Multi-touch screen, Pixel Imprint fingerprint sensor, 3-axis gyroscope/accelerometer, ambient light sensor, hall effect sensor
- Camera: Front: 8 MP, ƒ/1.9 aperture wide FoV, 1080p 30fps video, 1.4μm pixel size Rear: 8 MP, ƒ/1.8 aperture, 1080p 30fps video, 1.12μm pixel size
- Connectivity: Wi-Fi 802.11 a/b/g/n/ac, 2x2 MIMO, dual-band Bluetooth 4.2; Two USB-C ports Pogo pin accessory connector
- Power: 48 Wh rechargeable battery, Power Delivery over USB-C
- Dimensions: 202.04 mm (7.954 in) (h); 290.85 mm (11.451 in) (w); 7.0 mm (0.28 in) (d)
- Weight: 731 g (1.612 lb)
- Predecessor: Pixel C
- Successor: Pixel Tablet
- Related: Google Pixelbook; Pixel 3
- Website: store.google.com/us/product/pixel_slate

The Pixel Slate is a 12.3-inch tablet running ChromeOS. It was developed by Google and released on October 9, 2018, at the Made by Google event. In June 2019, Google announced it will not further develop the product line, and canceled two models that were under development. The Pixel Slate was removed from the Google Store in January 2021.

== History ==
The Pixel Slate was announced on October 9, 2018; prior to the Pixel Slate, the last tablet offered by Google was the Pixel C, introduced in 2015. Unlike the Pixel C, which ran on Android, the Pixel Slate used ChromeOS. Prices for the Pixel Slate ranged from $599 to $1599 in the United States, depending on the processor and storage capacity, with the tablets to be available in three countries later in 2018: the United States, Canada, and the United Kingdom. Matching keyboard ($199) and stylus ($99) accessories also were available at launch, although the stylus was a cosmetic variant of the existing stylus that had been released with the Pixelbook.

Preorders for the Pixel Slate were opened on November 6, 2018, with shipments expected to begin in late November. The entry-level $599 and $699 Celeron-based models were listed as "out of stock" shortly after release, making the $799 m3-based model the de facto entry-level model; the Celeron-based models were officially discontinued in June 2019, and a temporary price cut of $200 was applied to all models, making the m3-based model available at the prior $599 entry-level Celeron price point. Later that month, Google Hardware Senior Vice President Rick Osterloh confirmed that Google was discontinuing first-party tablet development.

Prices were cut by $350 for each model for the Black Friday sales in 2019, bundled with the keyboard and stylus. In an apparent move to clear out inventory, the prices of the remaining three models were cut by almost half in March 2020, again with the keyboard and stylus included at the reduced prices. The Pixel Slate was listed as "out of stock" or "no longer available" in December 2020, and on January 20, 2021, all listings for the Pixel Slate were removed from the Google Store. Google have announced the Pixel Slate will continue to receive automatic ChromeOS updates until August 2027.

== Specifications ==
=== Hardware ===
The Google Pixel Slate features a 12.3-inch (310mm) "Molecular" LCD with resolution of 3000 by 2000 (293ppi). The device has dimensions of 202 mm × 290.9 mm × 7 mm (8.0 in × 11.5 in × 0.3 in) (Height × Width × Thickness). The Slate features Intel processors ranging from a Celeron processor to an 8th-generation Core i7 and RAM available in 4, 8, and 16 GB. All models include a Titan C security chip. It is exclusively available in a "Midnight Blue" color and all models feature a side-mounted fingerprint scanner.

I/O comprises two USB-C ports, one on each side of the device; either can be used for charging its 48 Wh battery as well as media transfer. It has two cameras, one on the front and rear. The front camera has an 8-megapixel sensor with an aperture of f/1.9 and a 1.4μm pixel size. The rear camera also has an 8 megapixel sensor, though it has a slightly wider f/1.8 aperture and a 1.12μm pixel size. Both are capable of recording 1080p video at 30 fps. Both camera sensors are made by Sony (IMX319 on the front, IMX355 on the rear); the rear-facing Pixel Slate camera sensor is the same one used for the front-facing camera in the Pixel 3 smartphone.

==== Model-specific specs ====
The Pixel Slate is Google's first tablet to be powered by Intel processors, making it more similar in hardware to the Google Pixelbook and Chromebook Pixel. It has 5 hardware configurations available, starting with a Celeron CPU and up to a Core i7 Y-series CPU, with RAM options varying from 4 GB to 16 GB. The Celeron models were discontinued in June 2019, leaving the m3, i5, and i7 models available until its formal discontinuation in January 2021.

Configurations
Price tier (USD/GBP/CAD)	CPU	GPU	RAM	Internal storage
$799 / £749 / CA$1049	Intel Core m3-8100Y	Intel UHD Graphics 615	8 GB	64 GB eMMC
$999 / £949 / CA$1299	Intel Core i5-8200Y	Intel UHD Graphics 615	8 GB	128 GB eMMC
$1599 / £1549 / CA$1999	Intel Core i7-8500Y	Intel UHD Graphics 615	16 GB	256 GB eMMC

=== Software ===
The Google Pixel Slate runs the latest version of ChromeOS, which receives regular updates issued by Google every 2 to 3 weeks. Although ChromeOS is developed by Google, it is based on a Linux kernel similar to Android. As such the Pixel Slate can run Android apps natively with the Google Play Store.

When the Pixel Slate shipped it featured a revamped UI, new features, and bug fixes that weren't previously available on the Slate's predecessor, the Pixelbook.

== Accessories ==
The Pixel Slate has a variety of accessories sold by Google on their website or provided by third parties.

=== Keyboard and touchpad ===
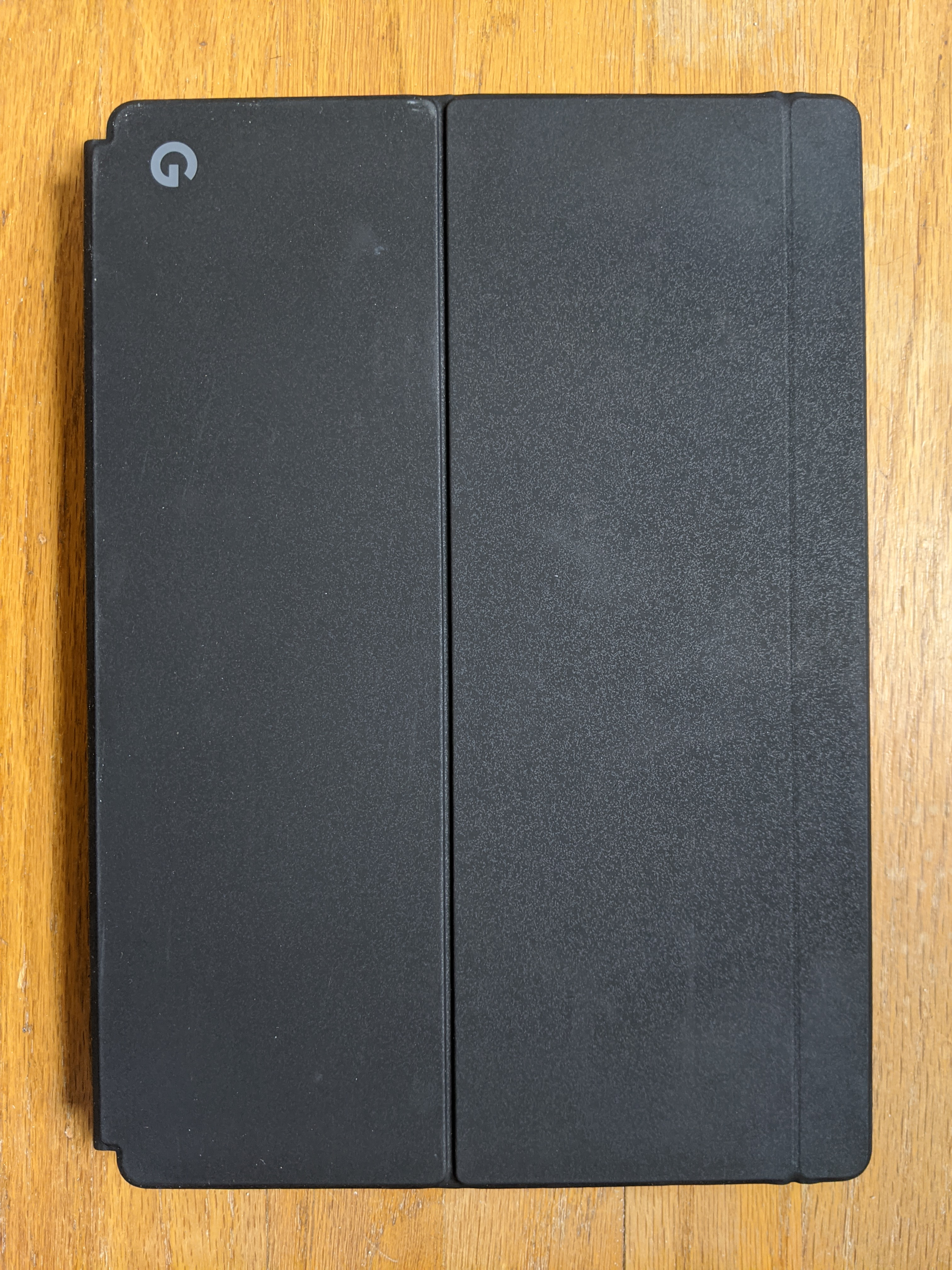
The Pixel Slate Keyboard serves as a folio case.

Although the Pixel Slate does not include a built-in keyboard, Google sells a folio-style keyboard and touchpad designed to work with the Pixel Slate. The keyboard attaches to the accessory connector through pogo pins. Retail price for the keyboard was US$199/£189/CA$259. The keyboard is very similar to the standard for Chromebook keyboards, with the Caps Lock key used to open the application menu and lacking traditional Function Keys, with buttons on the function key row specifically assigned to per-application or global shortcuts. Like the Pixelbook, the Pixel Slate keyboard comes with a dedicated Google Assistant button in the location where most keyboards have a Windows key.

Google's keyboard was criticized for difficulty in using the tablet and keyboard on one's lap, though not all reviewers found it problematic. Brydge also sells the G-Type, a clamshell-type keyboard for the Pixel Slate which connects via Bluetooth. The G-Type is very similar to their keyboard for the Surface Pro, and is able to be used with other devices that accept Bluetooth.

=== Pixelbook Pen ===
The Pixel Slate is compatible with the Pixelbook Pen, an active stylus originally released by Google for use with the Pixelbook. On the launch of the Slate, Google made the pen available in "Midnight Blue" to match the Pixel Slate. Retail price for the stylus was US$99/£79/CA$129. The Slate also works with several third-party styluses, though they must use the AES protocol.

=== Other accessories ===
Many of Google's Pixel branded accessories such as the Pixel Buds work with the Pixel Slate, but some third party manufacturers have made accessories for the Slate, including rubber cases, screen protectors, and folio cases and stands.

== Reception ==
The Pixel Slate received mixed reviews, with Gizmodo claiming it to be "a nearly perfect Chrome OS device" and The Guardian saying it "makes a very convincing argument for the death of Android tablets", while also noting that there were some issues with the Android experience. Marques Brownlee said of it "This ain't it chief!" and devoted a large portion of his review to the lag he experienced on his device. Brownlee's review was criticized online for having unrealistic expectations of the lowest-end model, though responses generally admitted the lag he experienced to be unacceptable.

Many reviews praised the Pixel Slate as being more of a crossover device than the iPad Pro or Surface Pro 6, while not quite matching up to either device's strengths. Other reviews compared it unfavorably to the HP Chromebook X2. Several also criticized the price, noting that devices like the HP Chromebook X2 were significantly cheaper for similar hardware. ZDNet's Matthew Miller followed up his generally positive review with an article noting that he had made it his primary device, while still providing a wishlist of additional features.

Reviews were generally positive regarding the build quality of the device, the display, and the sound quality. The primary negative review points were to do with software lag. It was reported in late December 2018 that Google were working on the issues reported, which affects all ChromeOS devices in tablet mode.
