= Slate Creek =

Slate Creek may refer to:

== Canada ==
- Slate Creek (British Columbia)

== United States ==
- Slate Creek (Alaska), a creek with an archaeological site in Nenana Valley, Alaska
- Slate Creek (Idaho), outflow of Ocalkens Lake in Custer County
- Slate Creek (North Yuba River), a tributary of the Yuba River in California
- Slate Creek (Pescadero Creek), in California
- Slate Creek (Rapid Creek), a stream in South Dakota
- Slate Creek (Virginia), a river in Virginia
