= Chromebook Pixel =

2013 Google laptop

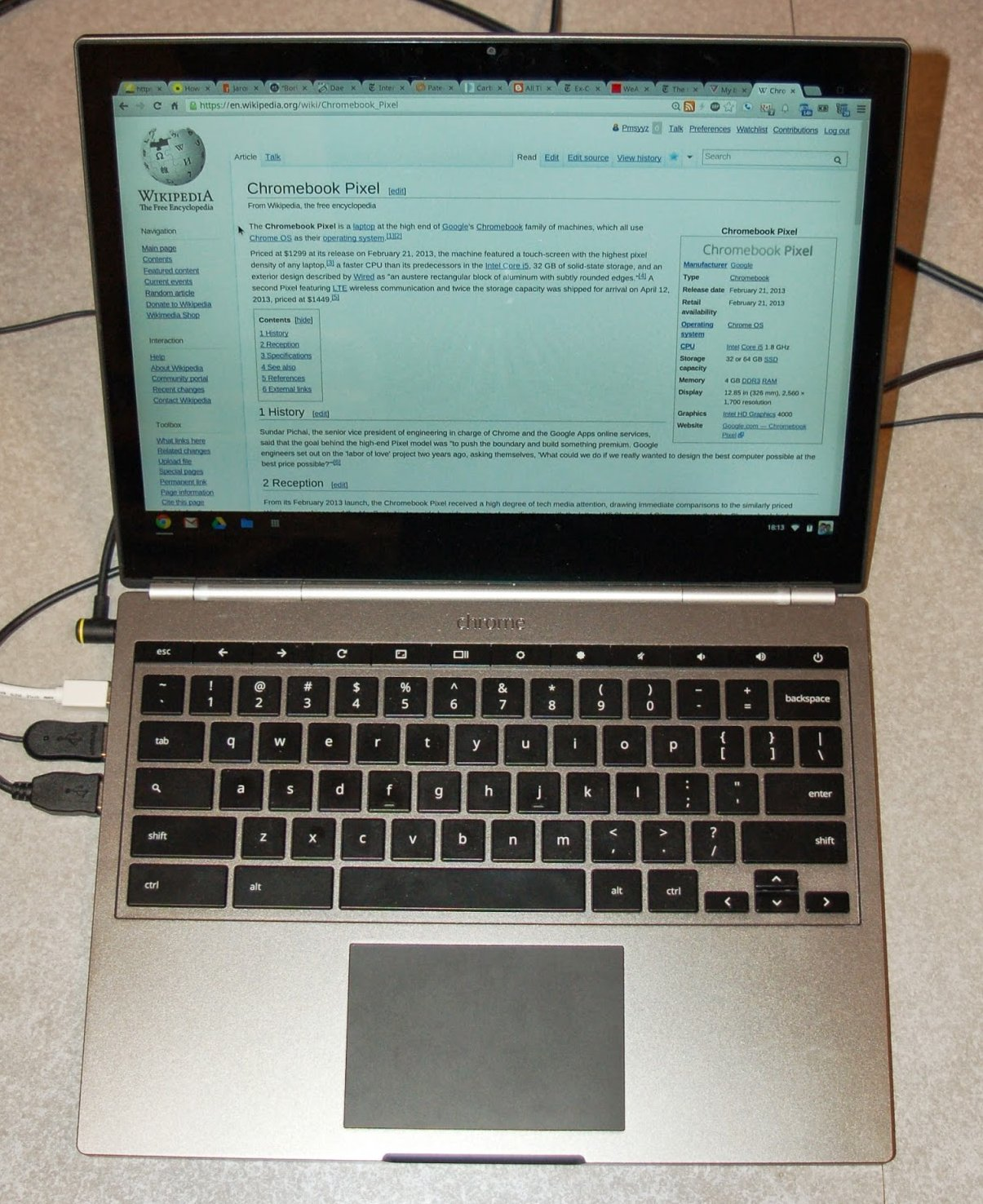
- Chromebook Pixel
- Manufacturer: Google
- Type: Chromebook
- Released: February 21, 2013; 13 years ago
- Discontinued: March 1, 2017; 9 years ago
- Operating system: Chrome OS
- CPU: Intel Core i5-3427U (2013) Intel Core i5-5200U (2015) Intel Core i7-5500U (2015 LS)
- Memory: 4 GB DDR3 RAM
- Storage: 32 GB SSD (2013 and 2015); 64 GB SSD (2015 LS)
- Display: 12.85 in (326 mm), 2,560 × 1,700 resolution
- Graphics: Intel HD Graphics 4000 (2013); Intel HD Graphics 5500 (2015)
- Successor: Pixelbook
- Website: pixel.google.com/chromebook-pixel/

The Chromebook Pixel is a 2013 laptop at the high end of Google's Chromebook family of machines, which all come preinstalled with ChromeOS operating system. The Chromebook Pixel is part of the Google Pixel series of consumer electronics. An updated model was released in 2015. Chromebook Pixel stopped receiving software and security updates in August 2018.

== History ==
The Chromebook Pixel was launched on February 21, 2013, with shipments starting immediately. Sundar Pichai, the senior vice president of engineering in charge of Chrome and Android at that time, said that the goal behind the high-end Pixel model was "to push the boundary and build something premium. Google engineers set out on the 'labor of love' project two years ago, asking themselves, 'What could we do if we really wanted to design the best computer possible at the best price possible?'"

The machines were assembled in China. Unlike its publicly announced partnerships utilized for the manufacturing of its Nexus phones and tablets, Google has not disclosed its manufacturing sub-contractor for the Chromebook Pixel.

In early 2015, a Google executive stated the Chromebook Pixel was "a development platform. This is really a proof of concept. We don't make very many of these — we really don't", confirming the Chromebook Pixel's slow sales, but added "we do have a new [Chromebook] Pixel coming out." The updated Chromebook Pixel was announced on March 11, 2015, and the 2013 model was discontinued immediately.

In August 2016, Google discontinued the Chromebook Pixel. On October 4, 2017, Google announced the Pixelbook laptop/tablet hybrid computer as the successor to the Chromebook Pixel.

== Design ==
Chromebook Pixel styling details

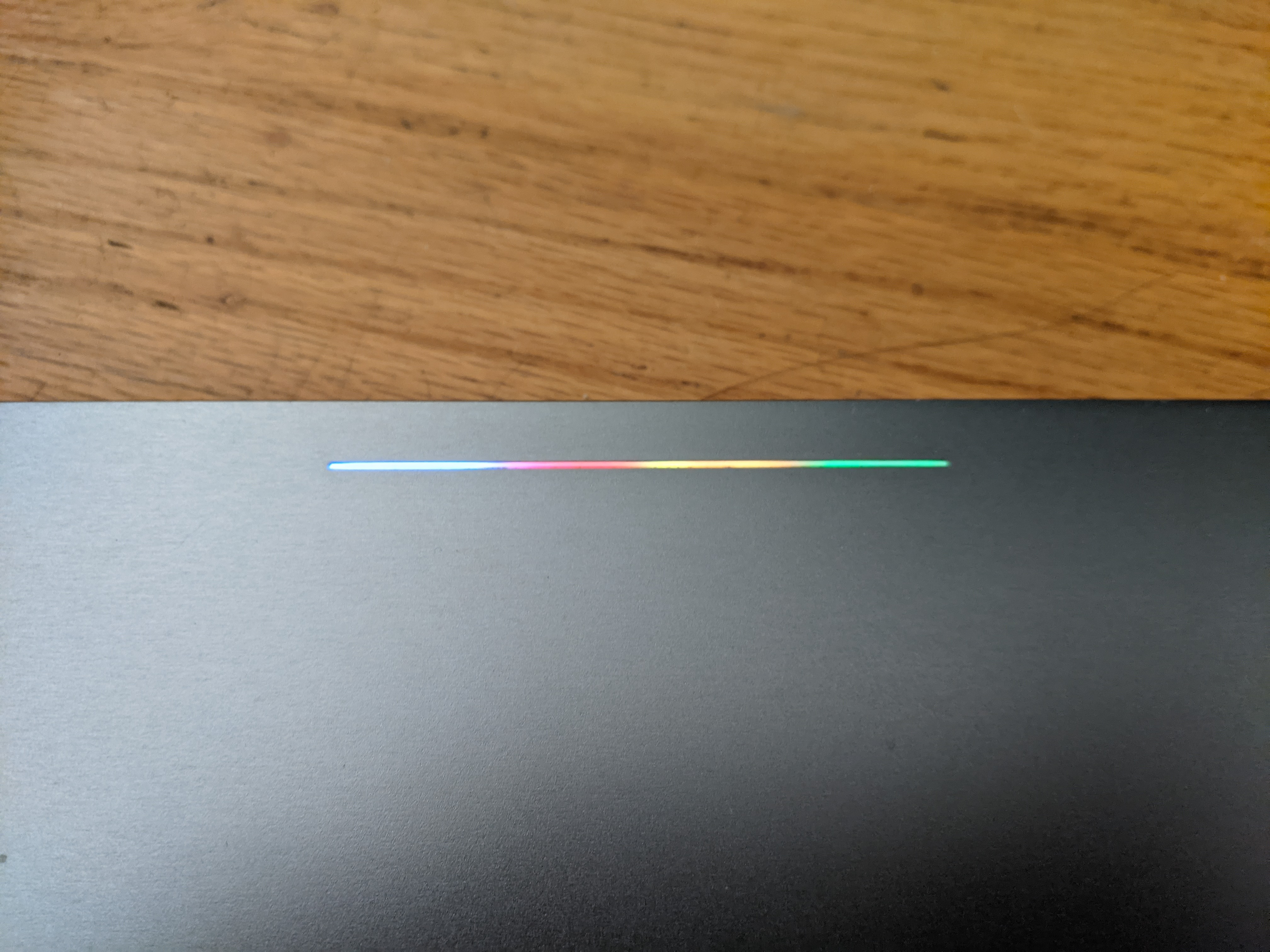
Four-segment light bar, at top of lid, illuminated with colors matching Google's logo

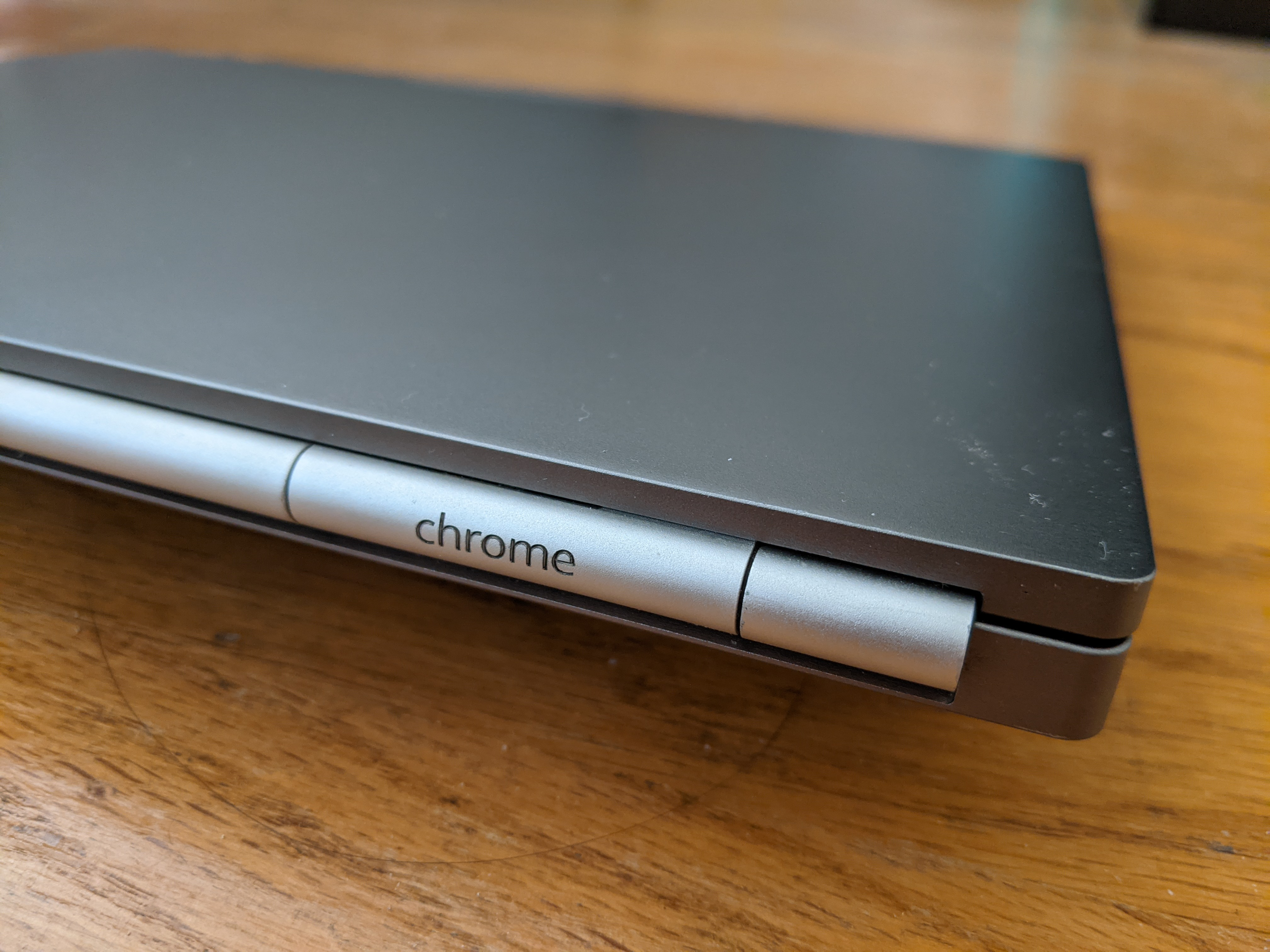
"Chrome" etched into exterior of display hinge

Priced at the upper-end of the laptop market for its release in the US on February 21, 2013, the machine featured a touch-screen which had the highest pixel density of any laptop, a faster CPU than its predecessors in the Intel Core i5, 32 GB of solid-state storage, an exterior design described by Wired as "an austere rectangular block of aluminum with subtly rounded edges", and a colored lightbar on the lid added purely for its cool factor. A second Pixel featuring LTE wireless communication and twice the storage capacity was shipped for arrival on April 12, 2013, and had a marginally higher price tag than the base model.

In addition to ChromeOS, the Pixel, as well as other Chromebooks, can run other operating systems including Ubuntu and Android—which in turn support more offline applications. Linux inventor Linus Torvalds replaced ChromeOS on his Chromebook Pixel with Fedora 18, employing Red Hat engineer David Miller's work. Torvalds had praised the Pixel screen but not the operating system, which he felt was better suited to slower hardware.

=== 3:2 display ===
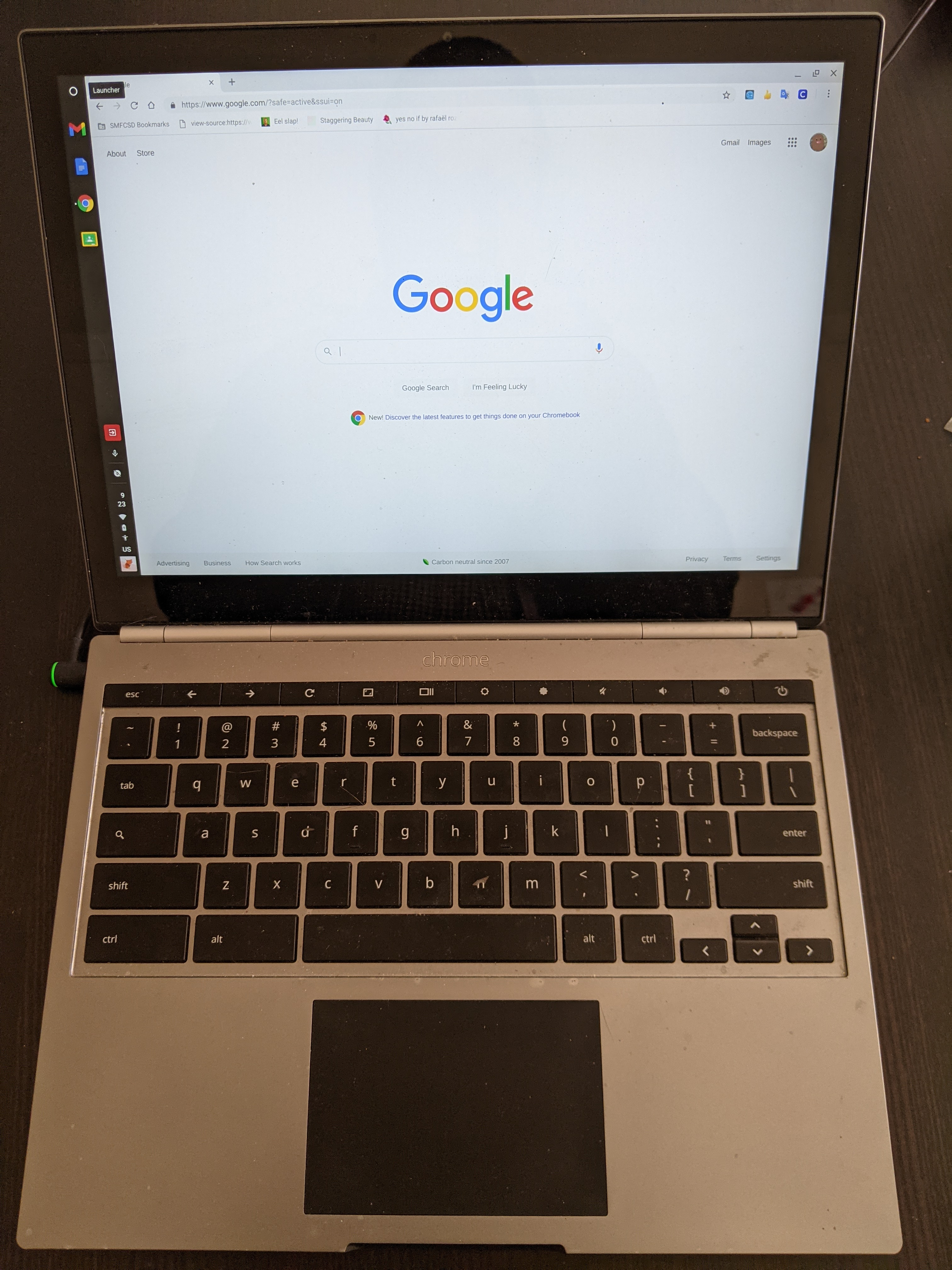
Chromebook Pixel (2013)

Chromebook Pixel introduced a 12.85-inch display with an aspect ratio of 3:2. The Verge praised it:

But the Pixel's 3:2 display, which is nearly as tall as it is wide, makes me wonder why no one else has thought to do this — the 12.85-inch display isn't quite as wide as a standard 13-inch screen, and you do get some letterboxing above and below any movie you're watching, but the tradeoff is simply more vertical space to read a web page. The unusual aspect ratio was probably an easier decision for Google to make, because web pages comprise the entire operating system, but I wish every laptop offered a 3:2 screen. That won't happen, of course, which is only more fodder for my wanting a Pixel.

=== 2015 update ===
The 2015 update reduced the price and replaced the power port, which previously used a proprietary barrel connector, with two USB-C ports, one on each side of the machine. Because the USB-C ports also carried video, the Mini DisplayPort was not included in the 2015 model; aside from that, the ports are the same. Internally, the keyboard was modified slightly to use standard keys for the top row, and battery life was increased to a claimed 12 hours.

In addition, a high-end Pixel LS ("Ludicrous Speed") model was made available with a Core i7 processor. An updated release of ChromeOS added support for Android applications on the 2015 Chromebook Pixel in 2016.

=== Specifications ===
Technical specifications
Model		Pixel (Wi-Fi)	Pixel (LTE)	Pixel (2015)	Pixel (LS)
Release	Date	February 2013	April 2013	March 2015	March 2015
Release	Price	US$1299	US$1449	US$999	US$1299
Dimensions	Size	297.7 mm × 224.6 mm × 16.2 mm (11.72 in × 8.84 in × 0.64 in)		297.7 mm × 224.55 mm × 15.3 mm (11.720 in × 8.841 in × 0.602 in)	
Dimensions	Weight	1.52 kilograms (3.4 lb)		1.5 kilograms (3.3 lb)	
Processor	CPU	Intel Core i5-3427U (dual-core 1.8 GHz)		Intel Core i5-5200U (dual-core 2.2 GHz)	Intel Core i7-5500U (dual-core 2.4 GHz)
Processor	GPU	Intel HD Graphics 4000 (integrated)		Intel HD Graphics 5500 (integrated)	
Memory		4 GB DDR3 RAM		8 GB DDR3 RAM	16 GB DDR3 RAM
Storage		32 GB Solid state	64 GB Solid state	32 GB Solid state	64 GB Solid state
Screen	Size	12.85 in (326 mm)			
Screen	Resolution	2,560 × 1,700 (239 ppi)			
Screen	Characteristics	3:2 (1.5:1) aspect ratio 400 nit brightness 178° viewing angle Multi-touch; Gorilla Glass			
Webcam		720p HD, integrated			
Keyboard		Backlit			
Touchpad		Clickable, etched-glass			
Audio		3.5-mm combo headphone/microphone jack 3 built-in microphones Integrated DSP (for noise cancellation); Stereo speakers			
Ports		2 × USB 2.0 Mini DisplayPort; SD/MMC card reader		2 × USB 3.1 Type-C (5 Gbit/s data, power in, video out) 2 × USB 3.0 Type-A; SD/MMC card reader	
Wireless	WiFi	802.11a/b/g/n Dual-band (2.4/5 GHz); 2×2 MIMO		802.11a/b/g/n/ac Dual-band (2.4/5 GHz); 2×2 MIMO	
Wireless	Bluetooth	Bluetooth 3.0		Bluetooth 4.0	
Wireless	WAN	-	LTE modem	-	
Battery		59 Wh (5 hours active use)		72 Wh (12 hours for average user behaviour)	
Included extras		1 TB Google Drive storage for 3 years 12 sessions GoGo Internet; 100 MB/month free from Verizon (US) (LTE only)		1 TB Google Drive storage for 3 years 12 sessions GoGo Internet	

== Reception ==
Chromebook Pixel (2013) ports

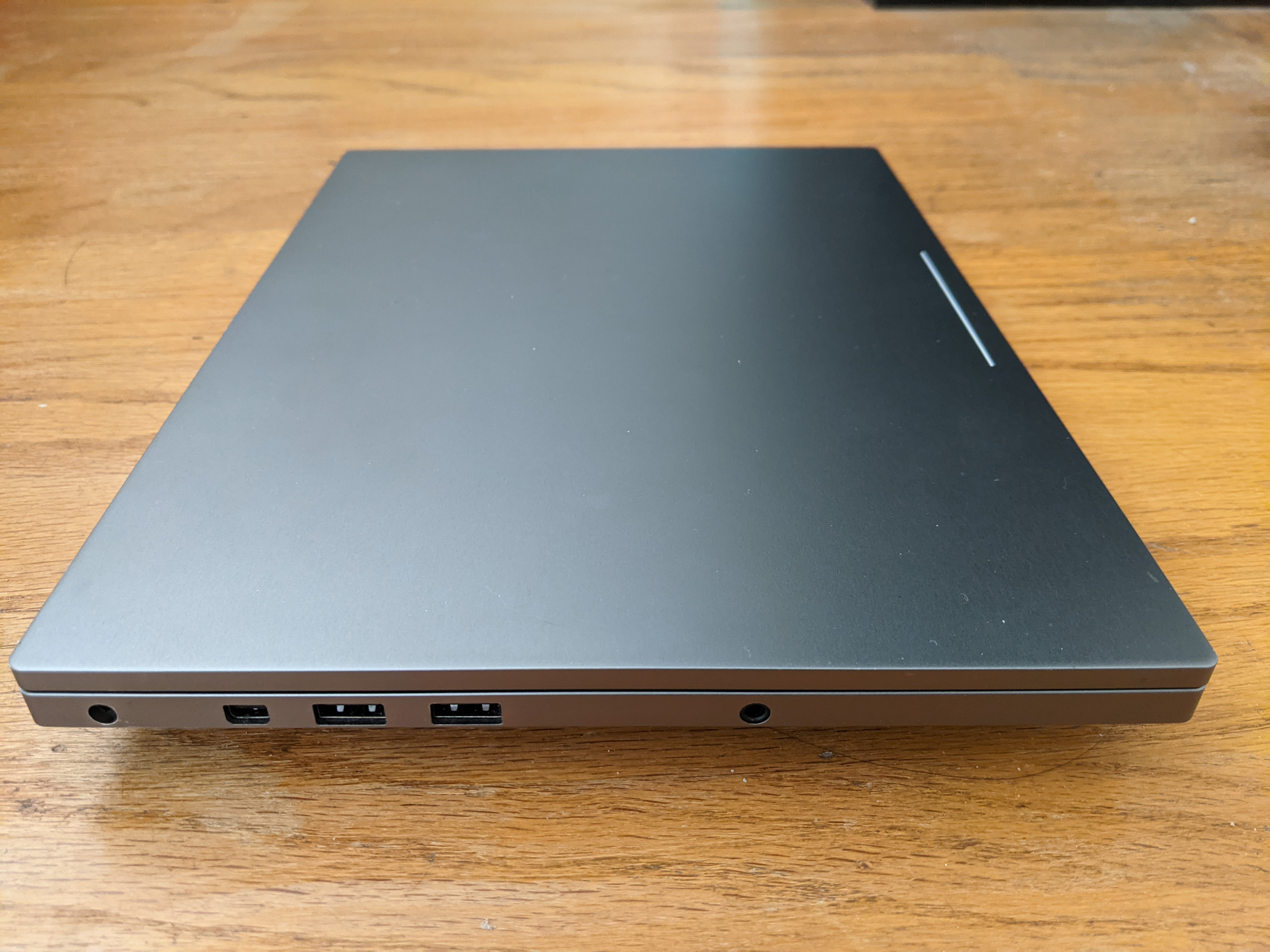
Left side, L–R: power, Mini DisplayPort, 2×USB 2.0, 3.5 mm jack

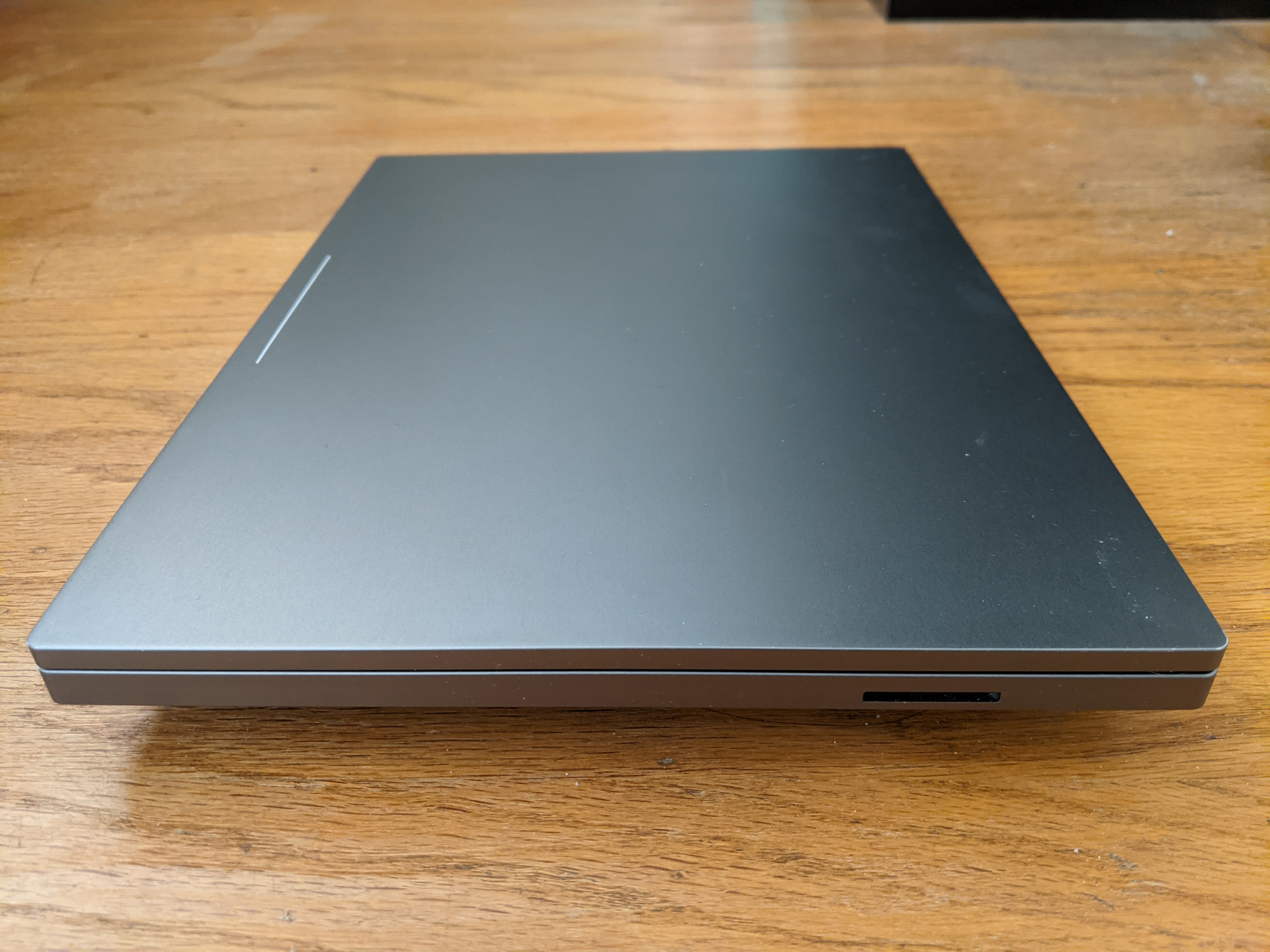
Right side: SD/MMC card reader

From its February 2013 launch, the Chromebook Pixel received a high degree of tech media attention, drawing immediate comparisons to the similarly priced Windows machines and the MacBook Air. Forbes magazine compared the Chromebook Pixel to similar priced MacBooks unfavourably. The reviewer noted the high price tag of the Chromebook Pixel came with distinct limitations caused by ChromeOS.

A review on CNET noted the high technical specs of the Chromebook Pixel. However the review also noted, "Web-based Chrome OS requires you to be online to do most tasks; Web apps can't yet compare to most Windows or Mac software, especially for media-centric activities like video." Similarly, PC Magazine's review said that "the Chromebook Pixel is essentially a thin client notebook with a brilliant screen."

Engadget's review was impressed with the build quality and attention to detail, especially for Google's first attempt at a laptop. However, the reviewer also considered the price tag, which matched top end laptops at the time of release, to be too high considering the limitations of the system. "It embraces a world where everyone is always connected and everything is done on the web – a world that few people currently live in."

The battery life, heat and fan noise were criticized in a ZDNet review. The reviewer also said, "The Chromebook Pixel does everything it can do very well, but with a lack of touch-optimised apps available and no support for desktop/legacy apps its usage could be limited, depending on your needs."

A reviewer for The Verge was impressed with the finish quality and technical specifications but found the product lacking some software capabilities such as image editing on Photoshop and productivity tools such as Evernote. These deficiencies prompted him to abandon the Chromebook Pixel when working, and return to his MacBook.

The Register and PC World saw the Chromebook Pixel as a concept machine, a bid by Google to push its hardware partners into producing more feature-rich devices. When interviewed by the BBC, CCS Insight analyst Geoff Blaber said that "Chromebooks have struggled for relevance", stuck between tablets used largely for entertainment and more functional PCs. The Pixel "won't transform [the Chromebook's] prospects but Google will hope it serves as a flagship device that has a halo effect for the broader portfolio."

== See also ==
- Pixelbook
- Google Nexus
- Google Store
- Pixel C
