= Slate (surname) =

Slate is a surname. Notable people with the surname include:

- Cody Slate (born 1987), American football player
- Jenny Slate (born 1982), American actress and comedian
- Jeremy Slate (1926–2006), American actor
- John Slate (1913–1967), American lawyer
- Anthony J. Slate (born 1993), Microbiology researcher

== Fictional characters ==
- Mr. Slate, a character from the animated television series The Flintstones
- Cornelius Slate, minor antagonist from the video game BioShock Infinite
