= Slate, Virginia =

Unincorporated community in Virginia, United States

Coordinates: 37°18′20″N 81°56′56″W

Slate is an unincorporated community in Buchanan County, Virginia, United States.

== History ==
A post office was established at Slate in 1938, and remained in operation until it was discontinued in 1965. The community took its name from Slate Creek.
