= Slate Creek (Rapid Creek tributary) =

River in South Dakota, United States

Coordinates: 44°04′59″N 103°36′52″W

Slate Creek is a stream in the U.S. state of South Dakota. It is a tributary of Rapid Creek.

Slate Creek was named for its slate creek bed.

== See also ==
- List of rivers of South Dakota
