= Pixelbook =

Laptop developed by Google

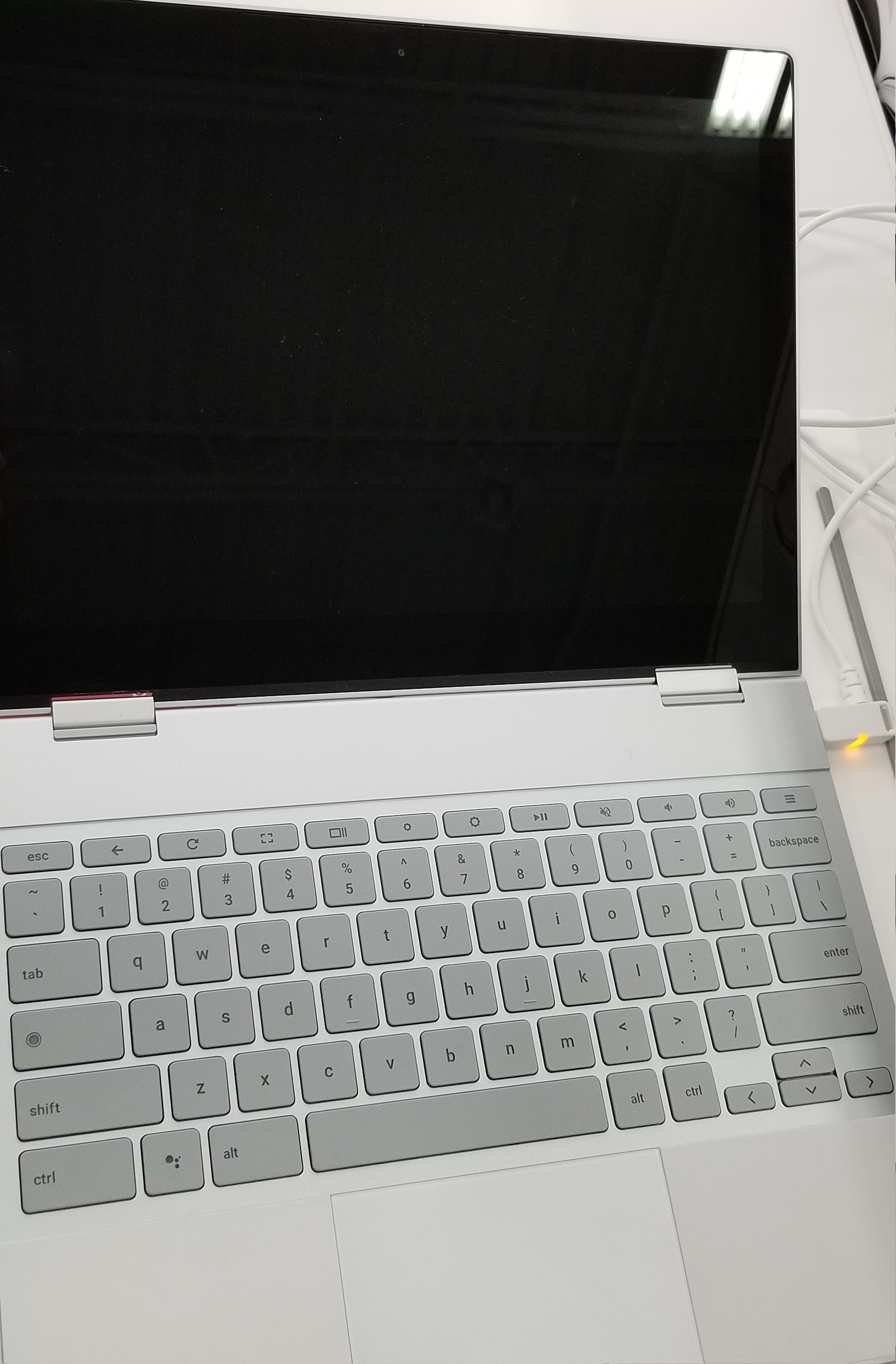
- Pixelbook
- Manufacturer: Google
- Product family: Google Pixel
- Type: Chromebook
- Released: October 30, 2017
- Operating system: ChromeOS
- CPU: Intel Core i5-7Y57 or i7-7Y75
- Memory: 8 or 16 GB RAM
- Storage: 128, 256 or 512 GB SSD
- Display: 12.3 in (310 mm), 2,400 × 1,600 resolution
- Connectivity: 2×USB-C; 1×3.5 mm jack; Wi-Fi 802.11 a/b/g/n/ac; Bluetooth 4.2
- Dimensions: (W×L×H): 220.8 mm × 290.4 mm × 10.3 mm (8.69 in × 11.43 in × 0.41 in)
- Weight: 1.11 kg (2.4 lb)
- Predecessor: Chromebook Pixel
- Successor: Pixelbook Go
- Related: Google Pixel Slate
- Website: store.google.com/us/product/google_pixelbook_specs

The Pixelbook (codenamed Eve during development) is a portable laptop/tablet hybrid computer developed by Google which runs ChromeOS. It was announced on October 4, 2017, and was released on October 30. In September 2022, Google canceled future generations of the product and dissolved the team working on it.

Unlike most typical Chromebook devices, the Pixelbook's retail price is much higher at around $1,000, comparable with laptops such as the Microsoft Surface Laptop.

== History ==
A rumored Pixel-branded Chromebook was anticipated to be launched at Google's annual fall hardware event in 2017 as a successor to the Chromebook Pixel; it was potentially a spinoff from the prior year's Project Bison, which was anticipated to be a laptop that could convert into a tablet mode. Google developed and launched a similar tablet with a detachable keyboard in 2018 (codenamed 'Nocturne') as the Pixel Slate.

The Pixelbook was planned as the next generation of Google laptops after the Chromebook Pixel laptop was discontinued in 2016. The company realised the Chromebook line had become successful after a slow start, obtaining a market share of 58% of schools in the US, and designed the Pixelbook as a serious industry player that can compete with Apple and Microsoft in this field.

Limited details, the name, and preliminary pricing for the Pixelbook leaked ahead of the official announcement; in addition, a stylus accessory would also be available. The Pixelbook was officially announced on October 4, 2017, at prices starting at US$999.

The Pixelbook Go was announced in October 2019 as a Chromebook with similar performance to the Pixelbook and also equipped with a touchscreen, but the Go dropped tablet mode and stylus support. By September 19, 2020, Google had de-listed all models of the original Pixelbook from its online store, effectively marking its discontinuation.

== Features ==
The Pixelbook features a 12.3-inch (310 mm) touchscreen design, allowing the device to be used like a tablet. The device also features Google Assistant with a dedicated button. It runs ChromeOS and can launch Android applications natively. There is a front-facing camera capable of recording video at 720p, 30 frames per second. The hinge allows nearly a full 360° range of motion, enabling the computer to operate in "laptop", "tent", or "tablet" modes, depending on the opening angle.

It features instant tethering; if a wifi signal is dropped, the Pixelbook will automatically connect to a suitable smartphone signal. Either of the computer's two USB-C ports may be used for charging; using the provided 45 W charger, charging takes up to two hours. The 41 W-hr battery has a claimed life of 10 hours.

Pixelbook initial pricing and configurations
Processor	RAM	Storage	Graphics	Price (USD/GBP)
Core i5-7Y57	8 GB	128 GB	Intel HD 615	US$999 / £999
Core i5-7Y57	8 GB	256 GB	Intel HD 615	US$1,199 / £1,199
Core i7-7Y75	16 GB	512 GB	Intel HD 615	US$1,699 / £1,699

The top-end version with a Core i7 processor was exclusive to the Google Store and availability lagged the other models; it was not available to order until December 2017, with first shipments in January 2018.

=== Accessories ===
The device is compatible with Pixelbook Pen, a stylus designed for Pixelbook and sold separately for $99/£99. The stylus is pressure- and angle-sensitive, and features latency of just 10 ms. It is powered by a AAAA battery.

== Response ==
The Pixelbook had a mixed response from the press, who praised the build quality but questioned the market for the device given the price.

- A review by The Verge said "Just like the iPad Pro, the Pixelbook is an incredibly nice and powerful machine that can handle most of your computing tasks — but probably not all of them."
- A review in The Guardian said "the king of Chromebooks is pricey but first rate."
- A review in Engadget described it as "a premium Chromebook that's worth the price."
- A review in Wired suggested that "I'm not sure anyone will buy one" in October 2017.
- The Financial Times published a positive review of the new Pixelbook, saying there was more functionality offline than in prior models, among other fixed problems.
