= Kaby Lake =

Microprocessor family released in 2016

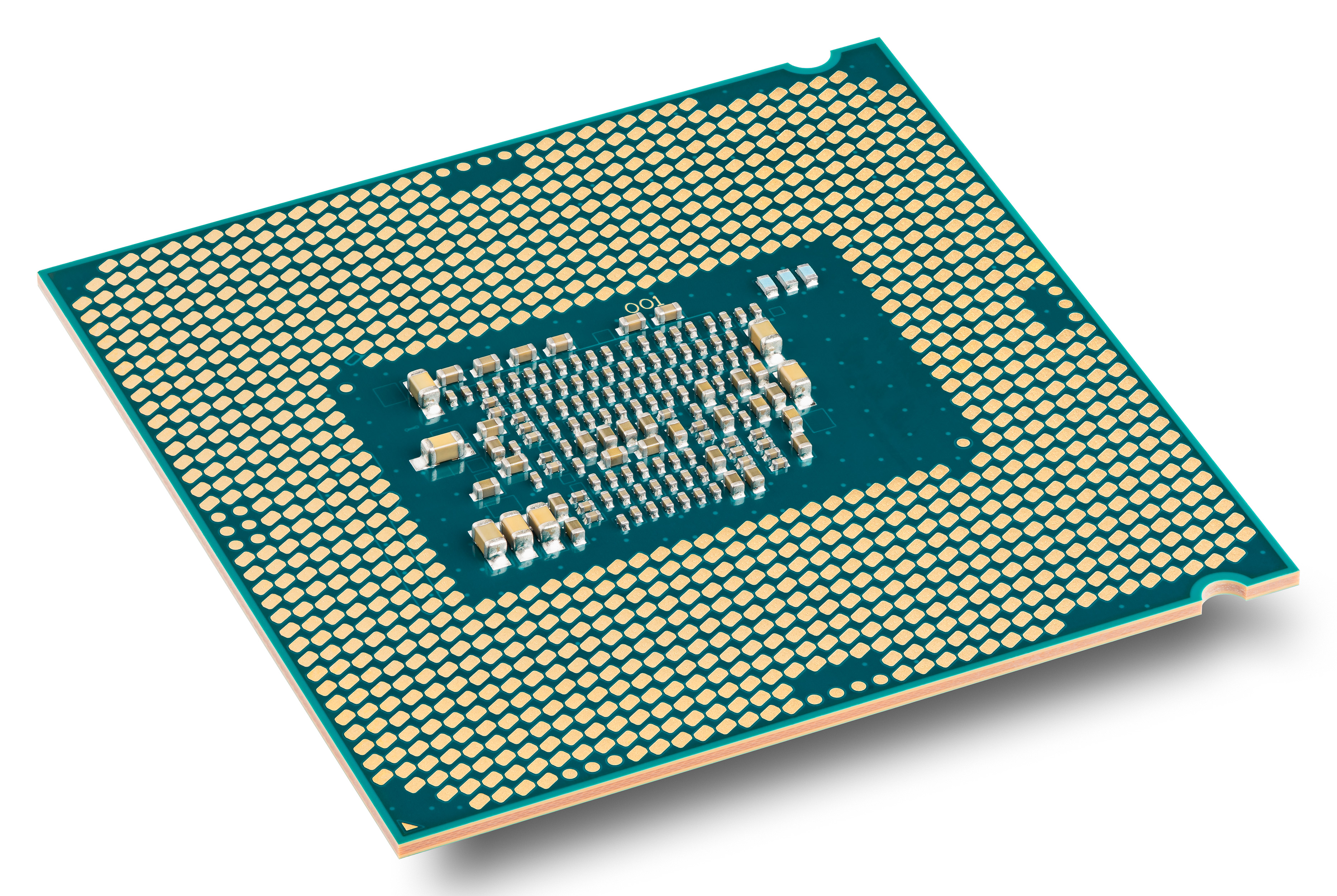
- Intel Celeron G3930

General information
- Launched: August 30, 2016; 10 years ago
- Discontinued: October 9, 2020 (desktop processors)
- CPUID code: 0806e9h, 0806eah, 0906e9h
- Product code: 80677

Performance
- Max. CPU clock rate: 1.00 GHz to 4.5 GHz

Physical specifications
- Cores: 2–4
- Socket: LGA 1151; LGA 2066; BGA1356; BGA1440; BGA1515

Cache
- L1 cache: 64 KB (Note: Transistorized memory, such as RAM, ROM, flash and cache sizes as well as file sizes are specified using binary meanings for K (1024^{1}), M (1024^{2}), G (1024^{3}), etc.) per core (32 KB instructions + 32 KB data)
- L2 cache: 256 KB per core
- L3 cache: Up to 8 MB, share
- L4 cache: 64 MB of eDRAM (on models with Iris Plus graphics)

Architecture and classification
- Technology node: Intel 14FF+
- Microarchitecture: Skylake
- Instruction set: x86-64
- Instructions: x86-64
- Extensions: MMX, AES-NI, CLMUL, FMA3, RDRAND; SSE, SSE2, SSE3, SSSE3, SSE4, SSE4.1, SSE4.2; AVX, AVX2, TXT, TSX, SGX; VT-x, VT-d

Products, models, variants
- Product code name: KBL
- Brand name: Core m3; Core i3; Core i5; Core i7; Celeron; Pentium; Xeon

History
- Predecessor: Skylake
- Successors: Desktop: Coffee Lake; Mobile: Whiskey Lake; Servers and enthusiast desktop: Cascade Lake

Support status
- Unsupported for Windows 11. Legacy support for iGPU.

Kaby Lake is Intel's codename for its seventh generation Core-branded microprocessor family announced on August 30, 2016. Like the preceding Skylake, Kaby Lake is produced using a 14 nanometer manufacturing process technology. Breaking with Intel's previous "tick–tock" manufacturing and design model, Kaby Lake represents the optimized step of the newer process–architecture–optimization model. Kaby Lake began shipping to manufacturers and OEMs in the second quarter of 2016, with its desktop chips officially launched in January 2017.

In August 2017, Intel announced Kaby Lake Refresh (Kaby Lake R) marketed as the 8th generation mobile CPUs, breaking the long cycle where architectures matched the corresponding generations of CPUs and meanwhile also supporting Windows 11. Skylake was anticipated to be succeeded by the 10 nanometer Cannon Lake, but it was announced in July 2015 that Cannon Lake had been delayed until the second half of 2017. In the meantime, Intel released a fourth 14 nm generation on October 5, 2017, named Coffee Lake. Cannon Lake would ultimately emerge in 2018, but only a single mobile CPU was released before it was discontinued the following year.

== Development history ==
As with previous Intel processors (such as the 8088, Banias, Dothan, Conroe, Sandy Bridge, Ivy Bridge, and Skylake), Kaby Lake's development was led by Intel's Israeli team, based in Haifa. Intel Israel Development Centers manager Ran Senderovitz said: "When we started out on the project, we were only thinking about basic improvements from the previous generation. But we began looking at things differently with a lot of innovation and determination and we achieved major improvements." He added that the performance of the seventh generation chips was improved by 12% for applications and 19% for Internet use compared with the sixth generation chips. Third-party benchmarks do not confirm these percentages as far as gaming is concerned.

== Features ==
Built on an improved 14 nm process (14FF+), Kaby Lake features faster CPU clock speeds, clock speed changes, and higher Turbo frequencies. Beyond these process and clock speed changes, little of the CPU architecture has changed from Skylake, resulting in identical IPC (Instructions Per Clock).

Kaby Lake features a new graphics architecture to improve performance in 3D graphics and 4K video playback. It adds native HDCP 2.2 support, along with fixed function decode of H.264 (AVC), HEVC Main and Main10/10-bit, and VP9 10-bit and 8-bit video. Hardware encode is supported for H.264 (AVC), HEVC Main10/10-bit, and VP9 8-bit video. VP9 10-bit encode is not supported in hardware. Both OpenGL 4.6 and OpenCL 3.0 are now supported.

Kaby Lake is the first Core architecture to support hyper-threading for the Pentium-branded desktop CPU SKU. Kaby Lake also features the first overclocking-enabled i3-branded CPU.

== Architecture changes compared to Skylake ==
Kaby Lake features the same CPU core and performance per MHz as Skylake. Features specific to Kaby Lake include:

=== CPU ===
- Intel claims 10x performance/Watt over Nehalem (up from 8x on Skylake)
- Increased clock speeds on some CPUs models
- Faster clock speed changes (improved Intel Speed Shift technology): it takes less time for the CPU to transition from one frequency to another, e.g. from a low-power state to a high-performance state – consequently this may bring an increase in performance and responsiveness
- Add hardware MBEC support

=== GPU ===
- Gen 9.5 (From Gen 9)
  - Add support for Microsoft PlayReady 3.0
  - HDCP 2.2
  - Add 1.4 Embedded DisplayPort (From 1.3)
  - Add HDMI 2.0 support (Most motherboards are limited to 1.4)
- Improved graphics core: full hardware fixed function HEVC/VP9 (including 4K@60fps/10bit) decoding; improved hardware HEVC encoding; full hardware fixed function VP9 8bit encoding; higher GPU clock speeds for select CPUs

=== I/O ===
- 200 series (Union Point) chipset on socket 1151 (Kaby Lake is compatible with 100 series chipset motherboards after a BIOS update)
- Up to 16 PCI Express 3.0 lanes from the CPU, 24 PCI Express 3.0 lanes from PCH
- Support for Intel Optane Memory storage caching (only on motherboards with the 200 series chipsets)
- Support for PTWRITE instruction to write data to an Intel Processor Trace packet stream

Starting from this generation, the built-in GPus core supports HAGS in the Windows 10 version of 2004 or newer, but currently support is only provided with insider drivers.

== Operating system support ==
Intel began to add Kaby Lake support to the Linux kernel on version 4.5. A P state bug was fixed in kernel 4.10 that had prevented motherboards from activating the processors' turbo frequencies.

Under new policies established in January 2016, Microsoft only supports an NT 10.0-based Windows platform on newly-released CPU microarchitectures, beginning with Kaby Lake and AMD Bristol Ridge. Therefore, Microsoft only supports Kaby Lake under Windows 10, and Windows Update blocks updates from being installed on Kaby Lake systems running versions older than Windows 10. In support of this restriction, Intel provides chipset drivers for Windows 10 only, although VirtualBox provides drivers for other versions. An enthusiast-created modification was released that disabled the Windows Update check and allowed Windows 8.1 and earlier to continue to be updated on Skylake and later platforms.

Support for Kaby Lake and older processors was dropped by Windows 11, with the exclusion of Kaby Lake R, Kaby Lake G, Kaby Lake X, and Amber Lake processors, as well as the Core i7-7820HQ.

== Known issues ==
Kaby Lake has a critical flaw where some short loops may cause unpredictable system behavior with hyper-threading enabled. The issue can be fixed if the motherboard manufacturer releases a BIOS update with the fix.

== TDP classification ==
Thermal design power (TDP) is the designed maximum heat generated by the chip running a specific workload at base clock. On a single microarchitecture, as the heat produced increases with voltage and frequency, this thermal design limit can also limit the maximum frequency of the processor. However, CPU testing and binning allows for products with lower voltage/power at a particular frequency, or higher frequency within the same power limit.

Desktop processors:

- High-power (K/X):
  - For dual-core: 60 W
  - For quad-core: 91 W (LGA1151) - 112W (LGA2066)
- Medium-power:
  - For dual-core: 51...54 W
  - For quad-core: 65 W
- Low-power (T): 35 W

Mobile processors:

- High-power (H): 45 W with configurable TDP-down to 35 W
- Medium-power (U): 15...28 W with configurable TDP-down to 7.5 W
- Low-power (Y): 5...7 W with configurable TDP-down to 3.5 W

== List of 7th generation Kaby Lake processors ==
=== Desktop processors ===
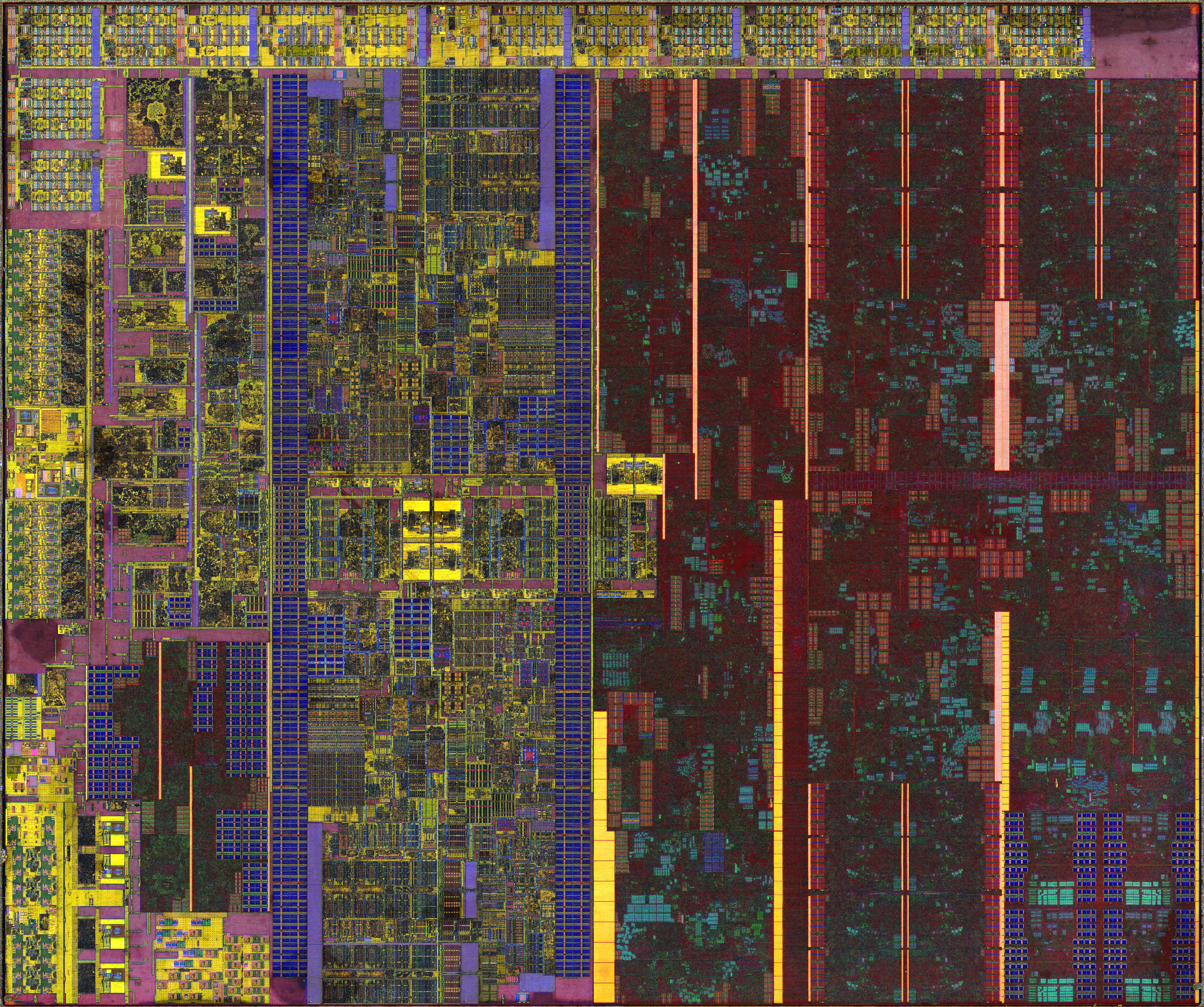
Intel Celeron G3930 die shot

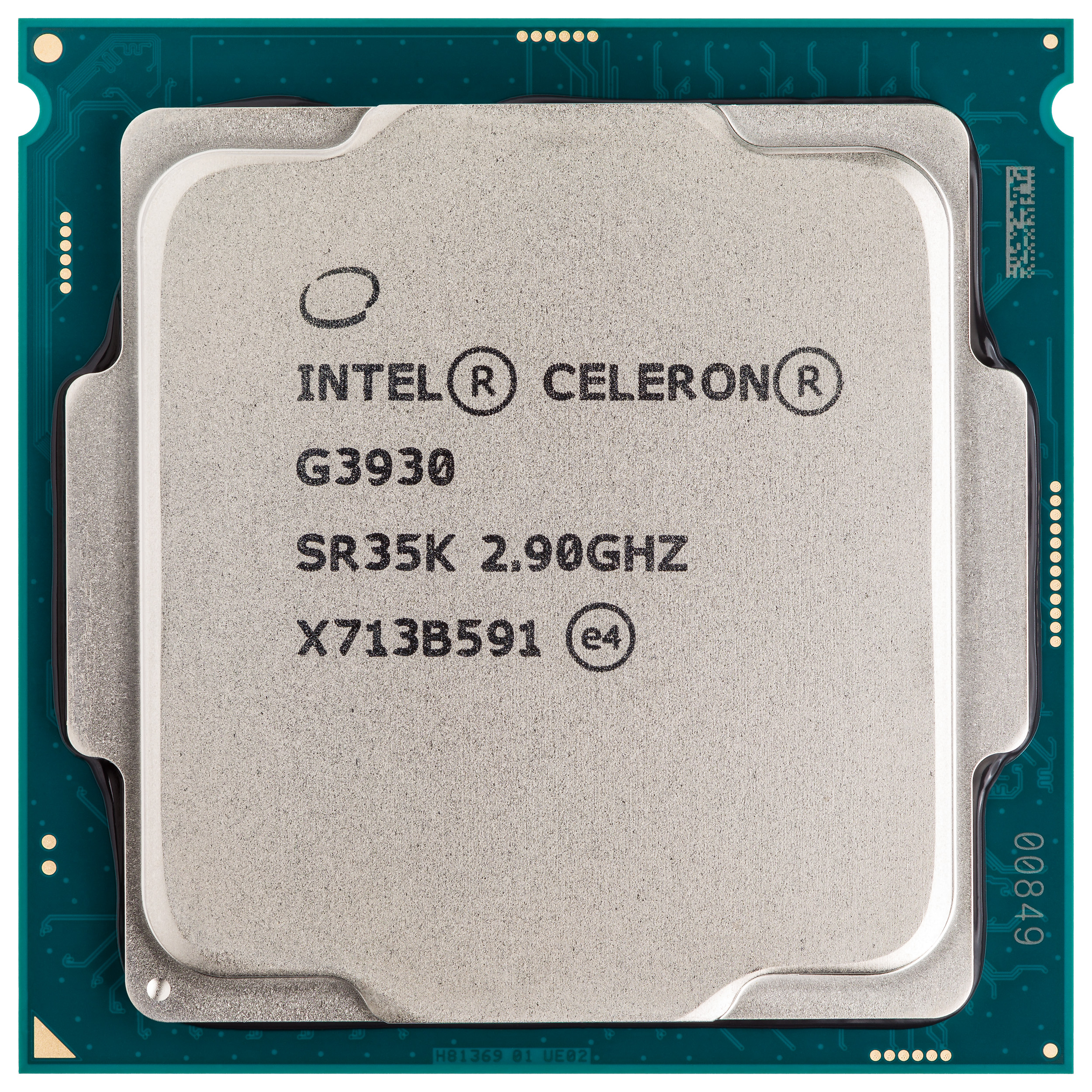
Intel Celeron G3930 top view

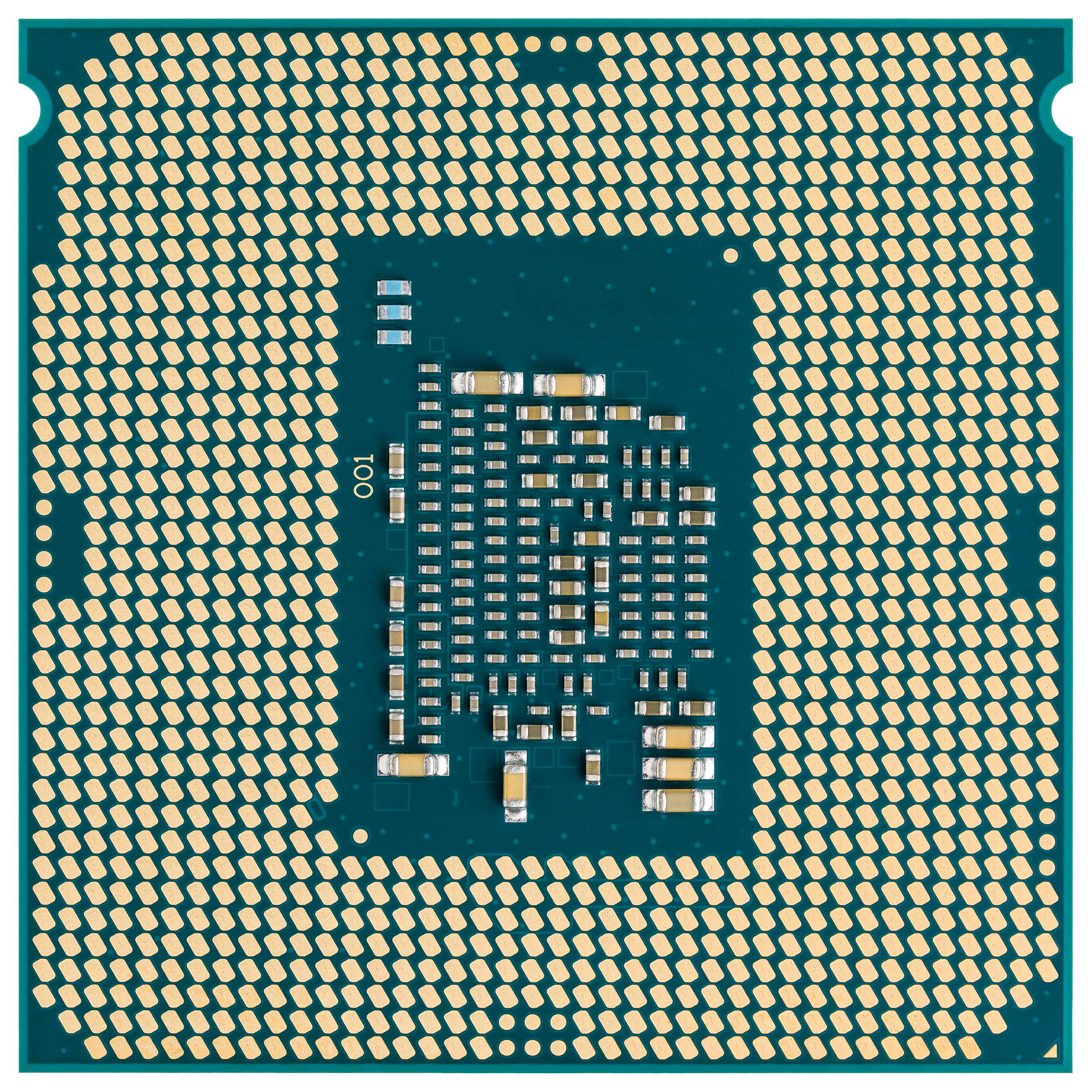
Intel Celeron G3930 bottom view

Features common to desktop Kaby Lake CPUs:

- LGA 1151 socket
- DMI 3.0 and PCIe 3.0 interfaces
- Dual channel memory support in the following configurations: DDR3L-1600 1.35 V (32 GB maximum) or DDR4-2400 1.2 V (64 GB maximum)
- A total of 16 PCIe lanes
- The Core-branded processors support the AVX2 instruction set. The Celeron and Pentium-branded ones support only SSE4.1/4.2.
- 350 MHz base graphics clock rate
- No L4 cache (eDRAM)
- A release date of January 3, 2017

Processor branding	Model	Cores (threads)	CPU clock rate (GHz)	Turbo clock (GHz) Num of cores			GPU	Max GPU clock rate	L3 cache	TDP	Socket	Price (USD)
Processor branding	Model	Cores (threads)	CPU clock rate (GHz)	1	2	4	GPU	Max GPU clock rate	L3 cache	TDP	Socket	Price (USD)
Core i7	7700K	4 (8)	4.2	4.5	4.4		HD 630	1150 MHz	8 MB	91 W	LGA 1151	$350
Core i7	7700	4 (8)	3.6	4.2	4.1	4.0	HD 630	1150 MHz	8 MB	65 W	LGA 1151	$312
Core i7	7700T	4 (8)	2.9	3.8	3.7	3.6	HD 630	1150 MHz	8 MB	35 W	LGA 1151	$312
Core i5	7600K	4 (4)	3.8	4.2	4.1	4.0	HD 630	1150 MHz	6 MB	91 W	LGA 1151	$250
Core i5	7600	4 (4)	3.5	4.1	4.0	3.9	HD 630	1150 MHz	6 MB	65 W	LGA 1151	$224
Core i5	7600T	4 (4)	2.8	3.7	3.6	3.5	HD 630	1100 MHz	6 MB	35 W	LGA 1151	$224
Core i5	7500	4 (4)	3.4	3.8	3.7	3.6	HD 630	1100 MHz	6 MB	65 W	LGA 1151	$202
Core i5	7500T	4 (4)	2.7	3.3	3.2	3.1	HD 630	1100 MHz	6 MB	35 W	LGA 1151	$202
Core i5	7400	4 (4)	3.0	3.5	3.4	3.3	HD 630	1000 MHz	6 MB	65 W	LGA 1151	$182
Core i5	7400T	4 (4)	2.4	3.0	2.9	2.7	HD 630	1000 MHz	6 MB	35 W	LGA 1151	$187
Core i3	7350K	2 (4)	4.2	—N/a			HD 630	1150 MHz	4 MB	60 W	LGA 1151	$179
Core i3	7320	2 (4)	4.1	—N/a			HD 630	1150 MHz	4 MB	51 W	LGA 1151	$157
Core i3	7300	2 (4)	4.0	—N/a			HD 630	1150 MHz	4 MB	51 W	LGA 1151	$147
Core i3	7300T	2 (4)	3.5	—N/a			HD 630	1100 MHz	4 MB	35 W	LGA 1151	$147
Core i3	7100	2 (4)	3.9	—N/a			HD 630	1100 MHz	3 MB	51 W	LGA 1151	$117
Core i3	7100T	2 (4)	3.4	—N/a			HD 630	1100 MHz	3 MB	35 W	LGA 1151	$117
Core i3	7101E	2 (4)	3.9	—N/a			HD 630	1100 MHz	3 MB	54 W	LGA 1151	$117
Core i3	7101TE	2 (4)	3.4	—N/a			HD 630	1100 MHz	3 MB	35 W	LGA 1151	$117
Pentium	G4620	2 (4)	3.7	—N/a			HD 630	1100 MHz	3 MB	51 W	LGA 1151	$93
Pentium	G4600	2 (4)	3.6	—N/a			HD 630	1100 MHz	3 MB	51 W	LGA 1151	$82
Pentium	G4600T	2 (4)	3.0	—N/a			HD 630	1050 MHz	3 MB	35 W	LGA 1151	$75
Pentium	G4560	2 (4)	3.5	—N/a			HD 610	1050 MHz	3 MB	54 W	LGA 1151	$64
Pentium	G4560T	2 (4)	2.9	—N/a			HD 610	1050 MHz	3 MB	35 W	LGA 1151	$64
Celeron	G3950	2 (2)	3.0	—N/a			HD 610	1050 MHz	2 MB	51 W	LGA 1151	$52
Celeron	G3930	2 (2)	2.9	—N/a			HD 610	1050 MHz	2 MB	51 W	LGA 1151	$42
Celeron	G3930T	2 (2)	2.7	—N/a			HD 610	1000 MHz	2 MB	35 W	LGA 1151	$42

=== High-end desktop processors (Kaby Lake-X) ===
Features common to desktop Kaby Lake-X CPUs:

- LGA 2066 socket
- Support DDR4-2666 (64 GB maximum), but not DDR3L memory
- A total of 16 PCIe lanes
- No integrated GPU
- A release date June 2017

Processor branding	Model	Cores (threads)	CPU clock rate (GHz)	Turbo clock (GHz) Num of cores			GPU	Max GPU clock rate	L3 cache	TDP	Socket	Price (USD)
Processor branding	Model	Cores (threads)	CPU clock rate (GHz)	1	2	4	GPU	Max GPU clock rate	L3 cache	TDP	Socket	Price (USD)
Core i7	7740X	4 (8)	4.3	4.5			—N/a		8 MB	112 W	LGA 2066	$350
Core i5	7640X	4 (4)	4.0	4.2		4.0	—N/a		6 MB	112 W	LGA 2066	$250

=== Mobile processors ===
==== High power ====
Maximum PCIe Lanes: 16. Release date: Q1 2017.

Processor branding	Model	Cores (threads)	CPU clock rate (GHz)	Turbo clock (GHz) Num of cores			GPU	Max GPU clock rate	L3 cache	TDP	cTDP		Price (USD)
Processor branding	Model	Cores (threads)	CPU clock rate (GHz)	1	2	4	GPU	Max.	L3 cache	TDP	Up	Down	Price (USD)
Core i7	7920HQ	4 (8)	3.1	4.1	3.9	3.7	HD 630	1100 MHz	8 MB	45 W	—N/a	35 W	$568
Core i7	7820HQ	4 (8)	2.9	3.9	3.7	3.5	HD 630	1100 MHz	8 MB	45 W	—N/a	35 W	$378
Core i7	7820HK	4 (8)	2.9	3.9	3.7	3.5	HD 630	1100 MHz	8 MB	45 W	—N/a	35 W	$378
Core i7	7700HQ	4 (8)	2.8	3.8	3.6	3.4	HD 630	1100 MHz	6 MB	45 W	—N/a	35 W	$378
Core i5	7440HQ	4 (4)	2.8	3.8	3.6	3.4	HD 630	1000 MHz	6 MB	45 W	—N/a	35 W	$250
Core i5	7300HQ	4 (4)	2.5	3.5	3.3	3.1	HD 630	1000 MHz	6 MB	45 W	—N/a	35 W	$250
Core i3	7100H	2 (4)	3.0	—N/a			HD 630	950 MHz	3 MB	35 W	—N/a	—N/a	$225

==== Low/medium power ====
Processor branding	Model	Cores (threads)	CPU clock rate (GHz)	Turbo clock (GHz) Num of cores		GPU	Max GPU clock rate	L3 cache	L4 cache	Max. PCIe lanes	TDP	cTDP		Release date	Price (USD)
Processor branding	Model	Cores (threads)	CPU clock rate (GHz)	1	2	GPU	Max GPU clock rate	L3 cache	L4 cache	Max. PCIe lanes	TDP	Up	Down	Release date	Price (USD)
Core i7	7Y75	2 (4)	1.3	3.6	3.4	HD 615	1050 MHz	4 MB	—N/a	10	4.5 W	7 W	3.5 W	Q3 2016	$393
Core i7	7500U	2 (4)	2.7	3.5		HD 620	1050 MHz	4 MB	—N/a	12	15 W	25 W	7.5 W	Q3 2016	$393
Core i7	7560U	2 (4)	2.4	3.8	3.7	Iris Plus 640	1050 MHz	4 MB	64 MB	12	15 W	—N/a	9.5 W	Q1 2017	$415
Core i7	7660U	2 (4)	2.5	4.0	3.8	Iris Plus 640	1100 MHz	4 MB	64 MB	12	15 W	—N/a	9.5 W	Q1 2017	$415
Core i7	7567U	2 (4)	2.5	4.0	3.9	Iris Plus 650	1150 MHz	4 MB	64 MB	12	28 W	—N/a	23 W	Q1 2017	?
Core i7	7600U	2 (4)	2.8	3.9		HD 620	1150 MHz	4 MB	—N/a	12	15 W		7.5 W	Q1 2017	$393
Core i5	7200U	2 (4)	2.5	3.1		HD 620	1000 MHz	3 MB	—N/a	12	15 W		7.5 W	Q3 2016	$281
Core i5	7Y54	2 (4)	1.2	3.2	2.8	HD 615	950 MHz	4 MB	—N/a	10	4.5 W	7 W	3.5 W	Q3 2016	$281
Core i5	7Y57	2 (4)	1.2	3.3	2.9	HD 615	950 MHz	4 MB	—N/a	10	15 W	7 W	3.5 W	Q1 2017	$281
Core i5	7260U	2 (4)	2.2	3.4		Iris Plus 640	950 MHz	4 MB	64 MB	12	15 W	—N/a	9.5 W	Q1 2017	$304
Core i5	7267U	2 (4)	3.1	3.5		Iris Plus 650	1050 MHz	4 MB	64 MB	12	28 W	—N/a	23 W	Q1 2017	?
Core i5	7287U	2 (4)	3.3	3.7		Iris Plus 650	1100 MHz	4 MB	64 MB	12	28 W	—N/a	23 W	Q1 2017	?
Core i5	7300U	2 (4)	2.6	3.5		HD 620	1100 MHz	3 MB	—N/a	12	15 W	25 W	7.5 W	Q1 2017	$281
Core i5	7360U	2 (4)	2.3	3.6		Iris Plus 640	1000 MHz	4 MB	64 MB	12	15 W	—N/a	9.5 W	Q1 2017	?
Core i3	7100U	2 (4)	2.4	—N/a		HD 620	1000 MHz	3 MB	—N/a	12	15 W	—N/a	7.5 W	Q3 2016	$281
Core i3	7167U	2 (4)	2.8	—N/a		Iris Plus 650	1000 MHz	3 MB	64 MB	12	28 W	—N/a	23 W	Q1 2017	?
Core i3	7130U	2 (4)	2.7	—N/a		HD 620	1000 MHz	3 MB	—N/a	12	15 W	—N/a	7.5 W	Q2 2017	$281
Core i3	7020U	2 (4)	2.3	—N/a		HD 620	1000 MHz	3 MB	—N/a	12	15 W	—N/a	7.5 W	Q2 2018	$281
Core m3	7Y32	2 (4)	1.1	3.0	?	HD 615	900 MHz	4 MB	—N/a	10	4.5 W	7 W	3.75 W	Q2 2017	$281
Core m3	7Y30	2 (4)	1.0	2.6	?	HD 615	900 MHz	4 MB	—N/a	10	4.5 W	7 W	3.5 W	Q3 2016	$281
Pentium Gold	4410Y	2 (4)	1.5	—N/a		HD 615	850 MHz	2 MB	—N/a	10	6 W	—N/a	4.5 W	Q1 2017	$161
Pentium Gold	4415Y	2 (4)	1.6	—N/a		HD 615	850 MHz	2 MB	—N/a	10	6 W	—N/a	4.5 W	Q1 2017	$161
Pentium Gold	4415U	2 (4)	2.3	—N/a		HD 610	950 MHz	2 MB	—N/a	10	15 W	—N/a	10 W	Q1 2017	$161
Celeron	3965U	2 (2)	2.2	—N/a		HD 610	900 MHz	2 MB	—N/a	10	15 W	—N/a	10 W	Q1 2017	$107
Celeron	3865U	2 (2)	1.8	—N/a		HD 610	900 MHz	2 MB	—N/a	10	15 W	—N/a	10 W	Q1 2017	$107
Celeron	3965Y	2 (2)	1.5	—N/a		HD 615	850 MHz	2 MB	—N/a	10	6 W	—N/a	4.5 W	Q2 2017	$107

=== Server/workstation Xeon processors ===
Target segment	Cores (threads)	Model	CPU clock rate (GHz)	Turbo clock (GHz) Num of cores			GPU	Max GPU clock rate	L3 cache	TDP	Release date	Price (USD)
Target segment	Cores (threads)	Model	CPU clock rate (GHz)	1	2	4	GPU	Max GPU clock rate	L3 cache	TDP	Release date	Price (USD)
Server	4 (8)	E3-1285 v6	4.1	4.5	?		HD P630	1150 MHz	8 MB	79 W	Q3 2017	$450
Server	4 (8)	E3-1280 v6	3.9	4.2	?		—N/a		8 MB	72 W	Q1 2017	$612↘383
Server	4 (8)	E3-1275 v6	3.8	4.2	?		HD P630	1150 MHz	8 MB	73 W	Q1 2017	$339
Server	4 (8)	E3-1270 v6	3.8	4.2	?		—N/a		8 MB	72 W	Q1 2017	$328
Server	4 (8)	E3-1245 v6	3.7	4.1	?		HD P630	1150 MHz	8 MB	73 W	Q1 2017	$284
Server	4 (8)	E3-1240 v6	3.7	4.1	?		—N/a		8 MB	72 W	Q1 2017	$272
Server	4 (8)	E3-1230 v6	3.5	3.9	?		—N/a		8 MB	72 W	Q1 2017	$250
Server	4 (4)	E3-1225 v6	3.3	3.7	?		HD P630	1150 MHz	8 MB	73 W	Q1 2017	$213
Server	4 (4)	E3-1220 v6	3.0	3.5	?		—N/a		8 MB	72 W	Q1 2017	$193
Mobile	4 (8)	E3-1535M v6	3.1	4.2	?		HD P630	1100 MHz	8 MB	45 W	Q1 2017	$623
Mobile	4 (8)	E3-1505M v6	3.0	4.0	?		HD P630	1100 MHz	8 MB	45 W	Q1 2017	$434
Embedded	4 (8)	E3-1505L v6	2.2	3.0	?		HD P630	1000 MHz	8 MB	25 W	Q1 2017	$433

== List of 8th generation Kaby Lake R processors ==
=== Mobile processors ===
==== Low/medium power ====
In late 2016, it was reported that Intel had been working on a processor family codenamed “Kaby Lake R” ("R" for "Refresh"). On August 21, 2017, the eighth generation mobile CPUs were announced. The first products released were four "Kaby Lake R" processors with a 15W TDP. This marketing is distinct from previous generational changes of the Core product line, where a new generation coincided with a new microarchitecture. Intel has stated that the 8th generation would be based on multiple microarchitectures, including Kaby Lake R, Coffee Lake, and Cannon Lake.

Processor branding	Model	Cores (threads)	CPU clock rate (GHz)	Turbo clock (GHz) Num of cores			GPU	Max GPU clock rate	L3 cache	TDP	cTDP		Release date	Price (USD)
Processor branding	Model	Cores (threads)	CPU clock rate (GHz)	1	2	4	GPU	Max GPU clock rate	L3 cache	TDP	Up	Down	Release date	Price (USD)
Core i7	8650U	4 (8)	1.9	4.2		3.9	UHD 620	1150 MHz	8 MB	15 W	25 W	10 W	Q3 2017	$409
Core i7	8550U	4 (8)	1.8	4.0		3.7	UHD 620	1150 MHz	8 MB	15 W	25 W	10 W	Q3 2017	$409
Core i5	8350U	4 (8)	1.7	3.6			UHD 620	1100 MHz	6 MB	15 W	25 W	10 W	Q3 2017	$297
Core i5	8250U	4 (8)	1.6	3.4			UHD 620	1100 MHz	6 MB	15 W	25 W	10 W	Q3 2017	$297
Core i3	8130U	2 (4)	2.2	3.4		—N/a	UHD 620	1000 MHz	4 MB	15 W	—N/a	10 W	Q1 2018	$281
Pentium Gold	4417U	2 (4)	2.3	—N/a			HD 610	950 MHz	2 MB	15 W	—N/a	12.5 W	Q1 2019	$161
Celeron	3867U	2 (4)	1.8	—N/a			HD 610	900 MHz	2 MB	15 W	—N/a	12.5 W	Q1 2019	

== List of 8th generation Kaby Lake G processors ==
=== Mobile processors ===
==== High power ====
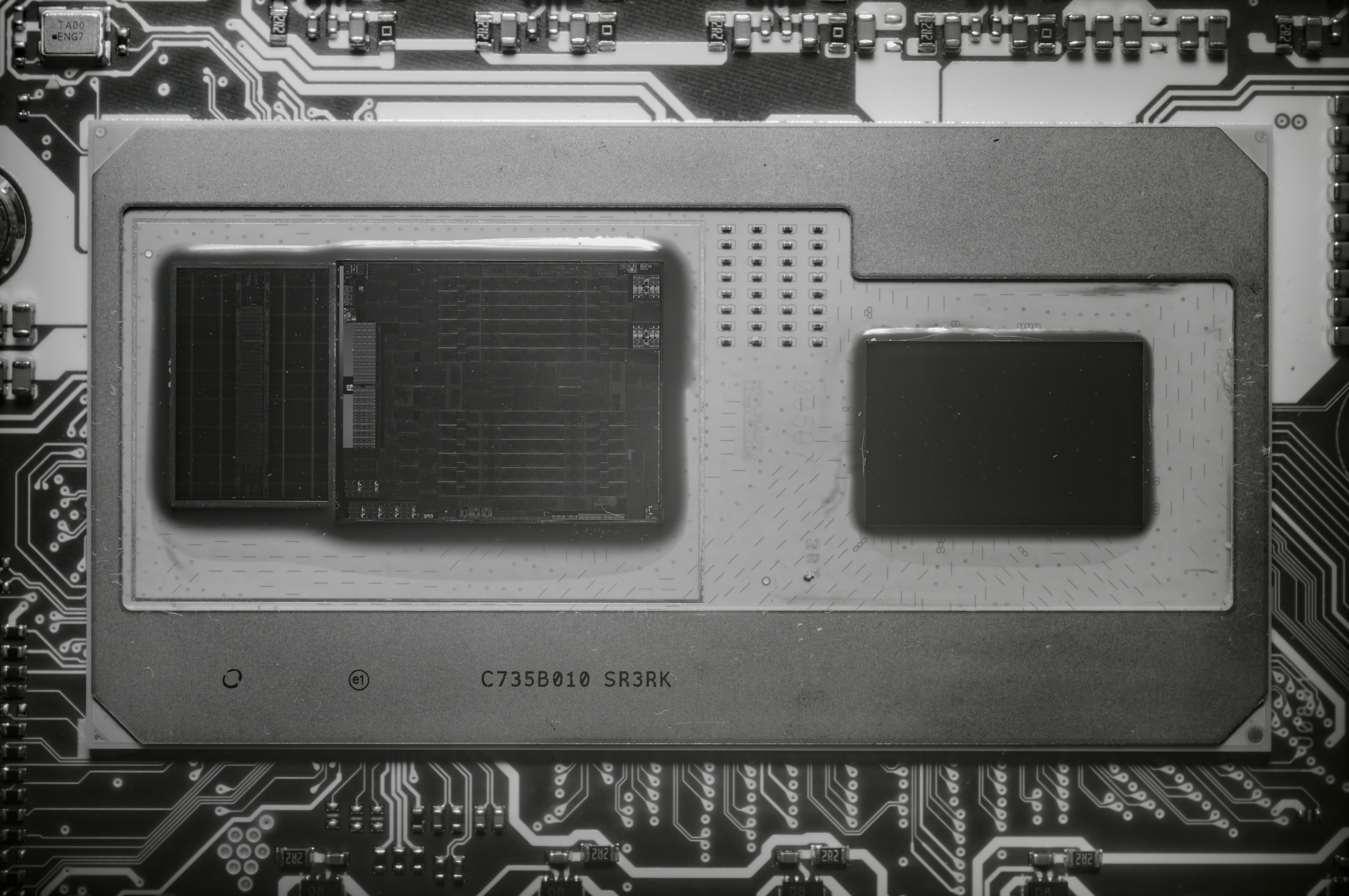
Kaby Lake-G with AMD Radeon graphics

Maximum number of PCIe lanes: 8. One-package processors with AMD Radeon discrete graphics chip - it is connected with main CPU core using an on-package PCI Express link. The Radeon GPU connects to its on-package HBM memory through an embedded multi-die interconnect bridge (EMIB). Release date: Q1 2018.

Processor branding	Model	Cores (threads)	CPU clock rate (GHz)	Turbo clock (GHz) Num of cores			GPU	Max GPU clock rate	Discrete GPU	L3 cache	TDP	Price (USD)
Processor branding	Model	Cores (threads)	CPU clock rate (GHz)	1	2	4	GPU	Max GPU clock rate	Discrete GPU	L3 cache	TDP	Price (USD)
Core i7	8809G	4 (8)	3.1	4.2	Unknown		HD 630	1100 MHz	Radeon RX Vega M GH	8 MB	100 W	?
Core i7	8709G	4 (8)	3.1	4.1	Unknown		HD 630	1100 MHz	Radeon RX Vega M GH	8 MB	100 W	?
Core i7	8706G	4 (8)	3.1	4.1	Unknown		HD 630	1100 MHz	Radeon RX Vega M GL	8 MB	65 W	?
Core i7	8705G	4 (8)	3.1	4.1	Unknown		HD 630	1100 MHz	Radeon RX Vega M GL	8 MB	65 W	$523
Core i5	8305G	4 (8)	2.8	3.8	Unknown		HD 630	1100 MHz	Radeon RX Vega M GL	6 MB	65 W	?

=== Discrete GPU specifications ===
Discrete GPU	Units		Clock rate		Memory			
Discrete GPU	Computing	Shading	Base	Max.	Size	Bandwidth	Bus type	Bus width
Radeon RX Vega M GH	24	1536	1063 MHz	1190 MHz	4 GB	204.8 GB/s	HBM2	1024 bit
Radeon RX Vega M GL	20	1280	931 MHz	1011 MHz	4 GB	179.2 GB/s	HBM2	1024 bit

== List of 8th generation Amber Lake Y processors ==
On August 28, 2018, Intel announced a refreshed lineup of ultra low power mobile Kaby Lake CPUs under the moniker Amber Lake.

=== Mobile processors ===
==== Low power ====
Processor branding	Model	Cores (threads)	CPU clock rate (GHz)		GPU	Max GPU clock rate	L3 cache	TDP	cTDP		Release date	Price
Processor branding	Model	Cores (threads)	Base	Max turbo	GPU	Max GPU clock rate	L3 cache	TDP	Up	Down	Release date	Price
Core i7	8500Y	2 (4)	1.5	4.2	UHD 615	1050 MHz	4 MB	5 W	7 W	3.5 W	Q1 2019	$393
Core i5	8310Y	2 (4)	1.6	3.9	UHD 617	1050 MHz	4 MB	7 W	—N/a		Q1 2019	$281
Core i5	8210Y	2 (4)	1.6	3.6	UHD 617	1050 MHz	4 MB	7 W	—N/a		Q1 2019	$281
Core i5	8200Y	2 (4)	1.3	3.9	UHD 615	950 MHz	4 MB	5 W	7 W	3.5 W	Q3 2018	$291
Core m3	8100Y	2 (4)	1.1	3.4	UHD 615	900 MHz	4 MB	5 W	8 W	4.5 W	Q3 2018	$281
Pentium Gold	4425Y	2 (4)	1.7	—N/a	UHD 615	850 MHz	2 MB	6 W	—N/a	4.5 W	Q1 2019	$161

== List of 10th generation Amber Lake Y processors ==
On August 21, 2019, Intel announced their 10th generation Amber Lake ultra-low power CPUs.

=== Mobile processors ===
Processor branding	Model	Cores (threads)	CPU clock rate (GHz)		GPU	Max GPU clock rate	L3 cache	TDP	cTDP		Price
Processor branding	Model	Cores (threads)	Base	Max turbo	GPU	Max GPU clock rate	L3 cache	TDP	Up	Down	Price
Core i7	10510Y	4 (8)	1.2	4.5	UHD	1150 MHz	8 MB	7 W	9 W	4.5 W	$403
Core i5	10310Y	4 (8)	1.1	4.1	UHD	1050 MHz	6 MB	7 W	9 W	5.5 W	$292
Core i5	10210Y	4 (8)	1.0	4.0	UHD	1050 MHz	6 MB	7 W	9 W	5.5 W	$292
Core i3	10110Y	2 (4)	1.0	4.0	UHD	1000 MHz	4 MB	7 W	9 W	5.5 W	$287
Core i3	10100Y	2 (4)	1.3	3.9	UHD	1000 MHz	4 MB	5 W	7 W	3.5 W	
Pentium Gold	6500Y	2 (4)	1.1	3.4	UHD	900 MHz	4 MB	5 W	7 W	3.5 W	

== See also ==
- List of Intel CPU microarchitectures
- List of Intel codenames
- Xeon - enterprise workstation x86 microprocessors

== Notes ==
Atom (ULV)		Node name	Pentium/Core						
Microarch.	Step	Node name	Microarch.	Step					
		600 nm	P6	Pentium Pro (133 MHz)					
		500 nm	P6	Pentium Pro (150 MHz)					
		350 nm	P6	Pentium Pro (166–200 MHz)					
		350 nm	P6	Klamath					
		250 nm	P6	Deschutes					
		250 nm	P6	Katmai	NetBurst				
		180 nm	P6	Coppermine	Willamette				
		130 nm	P6	Tualatin	Northwood				
		130 nm	Pentium M	Banias	Northwood		NetBurst(HT)		NetBurst(×2)
		90 nm	Pentium M	Dothan	Prescott	⇨	Prescott‑2M	⇨	Smithfield
		90 nm	Pentium M	Dothan	~~Tejas~~	→	⇩	→	~~Cedarmill (Tejas)~~
		65 nm	Pentium M	Yonah	~~Nehalem (NetBurst)~~		Cedar Mill	⇨	Presler
		65 nm	Core	Merom	4 cores on mainstream desktop, DDR3 introduced				
Bonnell	Bonnell	45 nm	Core	Penryn					
Bonnell	Bonnell	45 nm	Nehalem	Nehalem	HT reintroduced, integrated MC, PCH; L3-cache introduced, 256 KB L2-cache/core				
Bonnell	Saltwell	32 nm	Nehalem	Westmere	Introduced GPU on same package and AES-NI				
Bonnell	Saltwell	32 nm	Sandy Bridge	Sandy Bridge	On-die ring bus, no more non-UEFI motherboards				
Silvermont	Silvermont	22 nm	Sandy Bridge	Ivy Bridge					
Silvermont	Silvermont	22 nm	Haswell	Haswell	Fully integrated voltage regulator				
Silvermont	Airmont	14 nm	Haswell	Broadwell					
Silvermont	Airmont	14 nm	Skylake	Skylake	DDR4 introduced on mainstream desktop				
Goldmont		14 nm	Skylake	Kaby Lake					
Goldmont		14 nm	Skylake	Coffee Lake	6 cores on mainstream desktop				
Goldmont		14 nm	Skylake	Amber Lake	Mobile-only				
Goldmont Plus		14 nm	Skylake	Whiskey Lake	Mobile-only				
Goldmont Plus		14 nm	Skylake	Coffee Lake Refresh	8 cores on mainstream desktop				
Goldmont Plus		14 nm	Skylake	Comet Lake	10 cores on mainstream desktop				
Goldmont Plus		14 nm	Sunny Cove	Cypress Cove (Rocket Lake)	Backported Sunny Cove microarchitecture for 14 nm				
Tremont		10 nm	Skylake	Palm Cove (Cannon Lake)	Mobile-only				
Tremont		10 nm	Sunny Cove	Sunny Cove (Ice Lake)	512 KB L2-cache/core				
Tremont		10 nm	Sunny Cove	Willow Cove (Tiger Lake)	X^{e} graphics engine				
Gracemont		Intel 7 (10 nm ESF)	Golden Cove	Golden Cove (Alder Lake)	Hybrid, DDR5, PCIe 5.0				
Gracemont		Intel 7 (10 nm ESF)	Golden Cove	Raptor Cove (Raptor Lake)					
Crestmont		Intel 4	Redwood Cove	Meteor Lake	Mobile-only; NPU, chiplet architecture				
Crestmont		Intel 3	Redwood Cove	Arrow Lake-U					
Skymont		TSMC N3B	Lion Cove	Lunar Lake	Low power mobile only (9–30 W)				
Skymont		TSMC N3B	Lion Cove	Arrow Lake					
Darkmont		Intel 18A	Cougar Cove	Panther Lake					
Arctic Wolf		Intel 18A and/or TSMC N2P	Coyote Cove	Nova Lake					
