= Google Classroom =

Blended learning platform by Google

- Developer: Google
- Release: August 12, 2014; 12 years ago

Stable release(s) [±]
- Android: 3.60 (Build 929922714) / June 12, 2026; 4 months ago
- iOS (Note: Including iPadOS): 3.60 (Build 300049260) / June 15, 2026; 4 months ago
- Operating system: Android 8+; iOS 17+; Web
- Type: Educational software
- Website: classroom.google.com
- Repository: github.com/googleworkspace

Google Classroom is a free blended learning platform developed by Google for educational institutions that aims to simplify creating, distributing, and grading assignments. The primary purpose of Google Classroom is to streamline the process of sharing files between teachers and students. As of 2021, there are approximately 150 million users of Google Classroom.

Google Classroom uses a variety of proprietary user applications (Google Applications for Education) with the goal of managing student and teacher communication. Students can be invited to join a class through a private code or be imported automatically from a school domain. Each class creates a separate folder in the respective user's Google Drive, where the student can submit work to be graded by a teacher. Teachers can monitor each student's progress by reviewing the revision history of a document, and, after being graded, teachers can return work along with comments and grades.

== History ==
Google Classroom has undergone a series of updates and changes since its original release in May 2014.

Date	Update
May 6, 2014	Google Classroom was announced with a preview available for some members of Google's G Suite for Education program.
August 12, 2014	Google Classroom is released publicly.
2015	Google announced a Classroom API and a share button for websites, allowing school administrators and developers to further engage with Google Classroom. Google integrated Google Calendar into Classroom for assignment due dates, field trips, and class speakers.
2017	Google opened Classroom to allow any personal Google users to join classes without the requirement of having a G Suite for Education account, and in April of the same year, it became possible for any personal Google user to create and teach a class.
2018	Google introduced a major redesign to Classroom. This included adding a new classwork section, revising the grading interface, allowing the reuse of classwork from separate classes, and additional features for teachers to organize content by topic.
2019	78 new illustrated themes and the option to drag and drop topics and assignments within the classwork section were introduced.
2020	Google added integration with Google Meet so that teachers can have a unique Meet link within each class. In addition, several features were added to Classroom, with Google stating "as educators worldwide have reinvented their practice online, we're also adapting our tools to meet the evolving needs of their new educational landscape." These updates included: A to-do widget; 10 additional languages; Better integration with learning management systems to create and distribute assignments; Smart correct and auto-compose in Google Docs; Google Classroom also saw a sharp increase in usage as a result of the COVID-19 pandemic in which many schools shifted to remote education options. Specific research programs also used Google Classroom to engage in authentic learning from around the world.

== Features ==
Google Classroom integrates several Google Applications for Education, such as Google Drive, Google Docs, Google Sheets, Google Slides, Google Forms, Google Sites, and Gmail. A Google Calendar integration was later added to the platform. Students can be invited to classrooms through the institution's database, through a private code that can then be added in the student's user interface, or automatically imported from a school domain. Each class created with Google Classroom creates a separate folder in the respective user's Google Drive, where the student can submit work to be graded by a teacher.

=== Assignments ===
Assignments are stored and graded on Google's document applications. Rather than sharing documents that reside on the student's Google Drive with the teacher, files are hosted on the student's Drive and then submitted for grading. Teachers on Google Classroom have the option of creating assignments in various templates and formats with different accessibility options, such as permissions to view, edit, and comment. These assignments can be submitted for a grade and allow the teacher to provide feedback. Students may also attach additional documents to their assignment.

=== Grading ===
Google Classroom supports different grading schemes. Turned in assignments can be graded by teachers and returned with comments before the final submission, allowing for the students to modify their work. Once turned in, assignments can only be edited by the teacher.

=== Communication ===
Announcements can be posted by teachers to a "class stream" which can be commented on by students. Students may also post to the class stream, although teachers retain a moderator role. Multiple types of media from Google products such as YouTube videos and Google Drive files can be attached to announcements and posts to share content. Gmail also provides email options for teachers to send emails to one or more students in the Google Classroom interface.

=== Originality Report ===
Introduced in 2020, Originality Report is a built-in plagiarism detection tool which both students and teachers can access. Teachers can view the originality report, allowing them to verify the academic integrity of the student's submitted work. On the free version of G Suite for Education, teachers can turn on originality report for 3 assignments but have limited cloud storage. This restriction is lifted on the paid version of G Suite Enterprise for Education.

=== Archive Courses ===
Classroom allows instructors to archive courses at the end of a term or year. When a course is archived, it is removed from the homepage and placed in the Archived Classes area. When a course is archived, teachers and students can view it, but are unable to make any changes unless it is restored. A course must be archived for it to be permanently deleted.

=== Mobile Applications ===
Google Classroom mobile apps, introduced in January 2015, are available for iOS and Android devices.

== Reception ==
Ease of use, universal device accessibility, Google Drive integration, and the ability of teachers and students alike to quickly share content and feedback have been highlighted as strengths. Among Classroom's disadvantages, a review highlighted the service's heavy integration of Google apps and services with limited or no support for external files or services, lack of automated quizzes and tests, and a lack of live chats that can aid in feedback efforts. Google Classroom won a 2020 Webby Special Achievement Award.

== Criticism ==
As a company, Google has been criticized on several different issues, including privacy. Specific criticism of Google Classroom generally focuses on concern for privacy for students and Google's use of student data. Criticism of Google Classroom is often combined with criticism of Chromebooks and Google Workspace.

Other criticisms directed at Google Classroom are lack of a full-fledged grade book, lack of automatic quizzes and tests (common features in learning management systems), and editing of assignments once they are released. The platform's insistence on using a chronological order has been criticized as students respond with frustrations of having to scroll through to find past announcements.

During the COVID-19 pandemic, many classrooms pivoted to Classroom due to its usefulness and integration with existing Google products. While this provided equitable access to students and exposed learners to current and relevant online platforms, it also posed challenges such as unreliable internet connections, high costs of technology, and a lack and unavailability of training to use the platform.

Similarly to other online education platforms, adopting a fully remote or online education system brings forward socio-economic challenges such as access to technology in remote and lower socio-economic society areas. In studies discussing use of Google Classroom for English as a foreign language studies, students had positive perceptions towards using Google Classroom tools to learn about grammatical concepts and collaborate with others using student-to-student interactions and collaborative feedback.
