= Google for Education =

Service from Google

- Developer: Google Inc.
- Platform: Gmail, Calendar, Hangouts, Drive, Docs, Sheets, Slides, Google Sites and Vault.
- Type: Web productivity tools
- License: Proprietary
- Website: edu.google.com

Google for Education is a service from Google that provides independently customizable versions of several Google products using a domain name provided by the customer. It features several Web applications with similar functionality to traditional office suites, including Gmail, Hangouts, Meet, Google Calendar, Drive, Docs, Sheets, Slides, Groups, News, Play, Sites, and Vault. The products also tie into the use of Chromebooks which can be added to the Google Workspace Domain of the educational establishment.

Google Workspace for Education and Google Workspace for Nonprofits (for accredited 501(c)(3) nonprofit entities) are free and offer the same amount of storage as other Google Workspace accounts.

In addition to shared apps (calendar, docs, etc.), Google provides Google Workspace Marketplace, an app store for Google Workspace users. It contains various apps, both free and paid, which can be installed to customize the Google for Education experience for the user.
