= Google Workspace =

Productivity and collaboration software

- From left: Gmail, Google Calendar, Google Drive, Google Docs, Google Meet and Google Gemini
- Developer: Google
- Release: February 2006; 20 years ago (as "Google Apps for Your Domain")

Stable release(s) [±]
- Android: 1.26.453 / November 4, 2026; 10 days ago
- iOS (Note: Including iPadOS): 1.2026.45104 / November 10, 2026; 4 days ago
- Google Chrome: 1.111.1 / October 19, 2026; 26 days ago
- Type: Online office suite
- License: Trialware (Retail, volume licensing)
- Website: workspace.google.com
- Repository: github.com/googleworkspace

Google Workspace (formerly G Suite and Google Apps) is a collection of cloud computing, productivity and collaboration tools, software and products developed and marketed by Google. It consists of Gmail, Contacts, Calendar, Meet and Chat for communication; Drive for storage; and the Google Docs Editors suite for content creation. An Admin Panel is provided for managing users and services. Depending on the edition, Google Workspace may also include an option to purchase add-ons such as the telephony service Voice.

Classroom, a learning platform, is included in the education edition, called Workspace for Education. It previously included Currents for employee engagement.

While most of these services are individually available at no cost to consumers who use their free Google (Gmail) accounts, Google Workspace adds enterprise features such as custom email addresses at a domain (e.g. @your), an option for unlimited Drive storage, administrative tools and advanced settings, as well as 24/7 phone and email support.

The suite was first launched in February 2006 as Gmail for Your Domain, before being expanded into Google Apps for Your Domain in the same year, later rebranded as G Suite in 2016, then rebranded again in 2020 as Google Workspace.

As of October 2021, Google Workspace had 9 million paying businesses. The number of Education users in Google Workspace surpassed 170 million.

== History ==
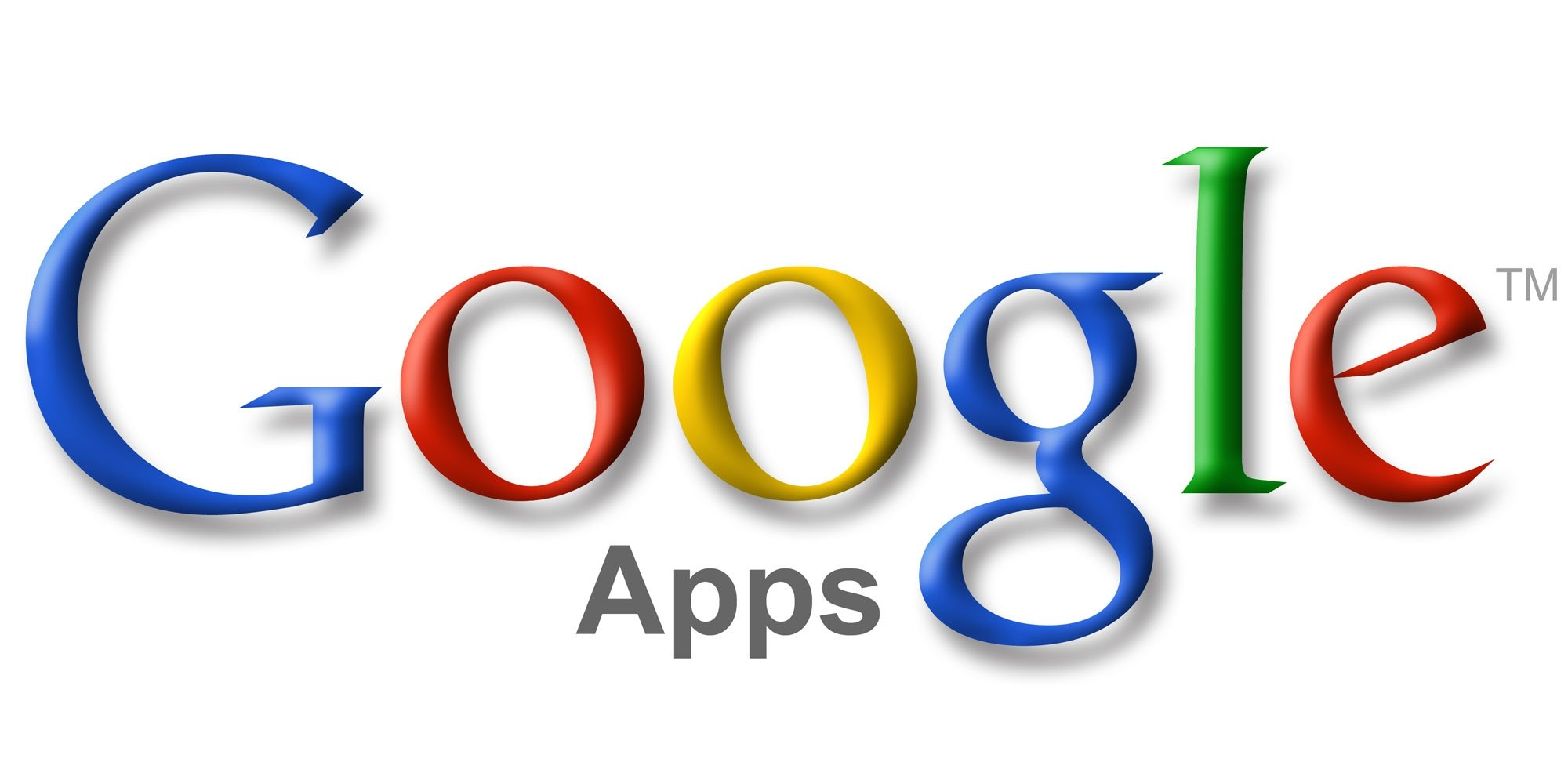
First Google Workspace logotype (Google Apps) (2010–2013)

Second Google Workspace logotype (Google Apps for Work) (2015–2016)

Third Google Workspace logotype (G Suite) (2016–2020)

Fourth Google Workspace logotype (2020–2026)

Fifth Google Workspace logotype (2026–present)

From February 10, 2006, Google started testing a version of the service at San Jose City College, hosting Gmail accounts with SJCC domain addresses and admin tools for account management. On August 28, 2006, Google launched Google Apps for Your Domain, a set of apps for organizations. Available for free as a beta service, it included Gmail, Talk, Calendar, and the Page Creator, which was later replaced with Sites. Dave Girouard, then Google's vice president and general manager for enterprise, outlined its benefits for business customers: "Organizations can let Google be the experts in delivering high quality email, messaging, and other web-based services while they focus on the needs of their users and their day-to-day business". Google announced an edition for schools, then known as Google Apps for Education, on October 10, 2006.

On February 22, 2007, Google introduced Google Apps Premier Edition, which differed from the free version by offering more storage (10 GB per user), APIs for business integration, 99.9% uptime for Gmail, and 24/7 phone support. It cost $50 per user account per year. According to Google, early adopters of Google Apps Premier Edition included Procter & Gamble, San Francisco Bay Pediatrics, and Salesforce. Additionally, all editions of Google Apps were then able to use Documents and Spreadsheets, users could access Gmail on BlackBerry mobile devices, and administrators gained more application control. Further enhancements came, on June 25, 2007, when Google added a number of features to Google Apps, including mail migration from external IMAP servers, shared address books, a visual overhaul of Google Docs and Google Sheets, and increased Gmail attachment size. A ZDNet article noted that Google Apps now offered a tool for switching from the popular Exchange Server and Domino, positioning Google as an alternative to Microsoft and IBM. On October 3, 2007, a month after acquiring Postini, Google announced that the startup's email security and compliance options had been added to Google Apps Premier Edition. Customers now had the ability to better configure their spam and virus filtering, implement retention policies, restore deleted messages, and give administrators access to all emails.

Google introduced Sites on February 28, 2008. Google Sites provided a simple new Google Apps tool for creating Intranet and team websites.

On June 9, 2009, Google launched Google Apps Sync for Outlook, a plugin that allows customers to synchronize their email, calendar, and contacts data between Outlook and Google Apps. Less than a month later, on July 7, 2009, Google announced that the services included in Google Apps—Gmail, Google Calendar, Google Docs, and Google Talk—were out of beta.

Google opened the Workspace Marketplace, on March 9, 2010, which is an online store for third-party business applications that integrate with Google Apps, to make it easier for users and software to do business in the cloud. Participating vendors included Intuit, Appirio, and Atlassian. On July 26, 2010, Google introduced an edition for governments, then-known as Google Apps for Government, which was designed to meet the public sector's unique policy and security needs. It was also announced that Google Apps had become the first suite of cloud applications to receive Federal Information Security Management Act (FISMA) certification and accreditation.

Nearly five years after the launch of Google Apps, on April 26, 2011, Google announced that organizations with more than 10 users were no longer eligible for the free edition of Google Apps. They would have to sign up for the paid version, now known as Google Apps for Business. A flexible billing plan was also introduced, giving customers the option of paying $5 per user per month with no contractual commitment.

On March 28, 2012, Google launched Google Vault, an optional electronic discovery and archiving service for Google Apps for Business customers. And then, on April 24, 2012, Google introduced Google Drive, a platform for storing and sharing files. Each Google Apps for Business user was given 5GB of Drive storage, with the option to purchase more. Later that year, Google announced that the free version of Google Apps would no longer be available to new customers.

Google unified the storage between Drive and Gmail, on May 13, 2013, giving Google Apps customers 30GB total that are shared across the apps.

On March 10, 2014, Google launched the Google Apps Referral Program, which offers participating individuals a $15 referral bonus for each new Google Apps user they refer. Google, on June 25, 2014, announced Drive for Work, a new Google Apps offering featuring unlimited file storage, advanced audit reporting, and new security controls for $10 per user per month.

Google Enterprise, the company's business product division, was officially renamed Google for Work on September 2, 2014. Eric Schmidt, then Google's executive chairman said, "we never set out to create a traditional 'enterprise' business—we wanted to create a new way of doing work (...) so the time has come for our name to catch up with our ambition".

Google announced that Google Apps would be rebranded as G Suite on September 29, 2016. Then, on October 25, 2016, Google launched the first hardware product for G Suite, the Jamboard; a 55-inch digital whiteboard connected to the cloud.

Google announced that G Suite would be rebranded as Google Workspace on October 6, 2020, and that Workspace would emphasize increased integration between the apps, such as the ability to create Docs from within Chats, or start a Meet call from within a presentation. As part of the rebranding, the iconic logos for Gmail, Google Drive, Google Docs, Google Calendar, Google Meet, and other products in Google Workspace were changed. These new logos corresponded to the similar changes which happened in Maps and Photos. The logo redesigns were met with mixed reactions by end users.

On June 14, 2021, Google announced that Google Workspace would be available to consumers with an account, along with the ability for users to fully switch from Hangouts to Chat, the rebranding of the "Rooms" feature in Gmail to "Spaces", a new "Google Workspace Individual" tier, a progressive web app for Workspace applications, and more.

On January 19, 2022, Google announced any "G Suite legacy free edition" accounts must be upgraded to a paid tier by May 1, 2022, or the account will be automatically upgraded. If a user does not manually upgrade to a paid tier and if no payment information is entered in the account admin page, the account will be suspended starting July 1, 2022. The free tier of accounts were available for users to sign up for from 2007 until 2012 at which point they were changed to a legacy status. This will not affect access to other Google Services, including YouTube, Google Photos, and Google Play, nor paid content, including YouTube and Play Store purchases. On May 17, 2022, Google announced they would offer "G Suite legacy free edition" accounts the option to self-identify they are using these accounts for non-business use. This would then give them the chance to keep using this service for "Free". They did say that business features might be removed at a later date, without giving indication what those features might be.

In March 2023, Google brought generative AI capabilities to Google Workspace (initially to a limited set of trusted testers).

== Products ==
Google Workspace comprises Mail, Chat, Meet, Calendar, Drive for storage; Docs, Sheets, Slides, Forms, Keep for notes, Sites for collaboration, Apps Script for building low-code/no-code business applications; and an Admin panel and Vault for managing users and the services.

Optional add-ons include Voice, AppSheet and Meet hardware.

All Workspace Business and Enterprise plans include access to Gemini for Workspace without the need to purchase an additional add-on.

The Starter plan includes email addresses with custom domains (@yourcompany.com), video and voice calls, calendars, 30GB storage, collaborative documents, spreadsheets, presentations, and sites, controls for security and privacy, and 24/7 phone and email support. The Business Plus plan enables many additional custom features, including advanced admin controls for Drive, 5TB storage on Drive, audit and reporting insights for Drive content and sharing, custom message retention policies, and more. Enterprise-level customers receive S/MIME encryption, noise cancellation in Meet, and as much storage as they need.

=== Gmail ===
Gmail is a web-based email service, launched in a limited beta release on April 1, 2004. With over 1 billion active consumer users worldwide in February 2016, it has become popular for giving users large amounts of storage space, and for having threaded conversations and robust search capabilities.

As part of Google Workspace, Gmail comes with additional features designed for business use, including:

- Email addresses with the customer's domain name (@yourcompany.com)
- 99.9% guaranteed uptime with zero scheduled downtime for maintenance
- 15GB of storage space
- 24/7 phone and email support
- Synchronization compatibility with Microsoft Outlook and other email providers
- Support for add-ons that integrate third-party apps purchased from the Google Workspace Marketplace with Gmail

=== Google Drive ===
Google Drive is a file storage and synchronization service, launched on April 24, 2012. The official announcement described Drive as "a place where you can create, share, collaborate, and keep all of your stuff".

With Google Drive, users can upload any type of file to the cloud, share them with others, and access them from any computer, tablet, or smartphone. Users can sync files between their device and the cloud with apps for Microsoft Windows and Apple macOS computers, and Android and IOS smartphones and tablets.

As part of Google Workspace, Google Drive comes with additional features designed for business use, including:

- Either 15GB, 2TB, 5TB per user limited storage, depending on the plan
- Advanced admin controls, depending on the plan
- Audit and reporting insights for Drive content and sharing, depending on the plan

=== Google Docs Editors ===
==== Google Docs, Sheets, and Slides ====
Google Docs, Google Sheets and Google Slides are a word processor, a spreadsheet and a presentation program respectively. The three programs originate from company acquisitions in 2006, and are today integrated into Google Drive as part of the Google Docs suite. They all serve as collaborative software that allow users to view and edit documents, spreadsheets and presentations together in real-time through a web browser or mobile device. Changes are saved automatically, with a revision history keeping track of changes. There is also the capability to set user permission levels to designate who can view, comment or edit the document as well as permissions to download the specific document. Google Forms, meanwhile, is a tool that allows collecting information from users via a personalized survey or quiz. The information is then collected and automatically connected to a spreadsheet. The spreadsheet is populated with the survey and quiz responses.

In June 2014, Google introduced Office support in Google Docs, Sheets, and Slides without the need for file conversion. Writing for TechCrunch, Frederic Lardinois wrote that "Google is clearly positioning its apps as a more affordable solutions for companies that need to occasionally edit Office files".

As part of Google Workspace, Google Docs and Slides come with additional features designed for business use, including unlimited revision history. Google Workspace also has garnered a strong following in education, with over 70 million users by 2017.

==== Google Forms ====
Google Forms is a survey application. Forms features all of the collaboration and sharing features found in Docs, Sheets, and Slides. It can also be used to create quizzes, including some specialized functions that are of use in educational settings.

==== Google Sites ====
Google Sites is a creation tool that allows multiple people to create and edit websites, without requiring coding knowledge or other web design skills. It was introduced in February 2008 in an effort to help customers "quickly gather a variety of information in one place – including videos, calendars, presentations, attachments, and text – and easily share it for viewing or editing with a small group, their entire organization, or the world."

==== Google Drawings ====
Google Drawings is a free, web‑based diagramming tool included in the Google Docs Editors suite. It allows users to create flowcharts, charts, and illustrations with real‑time collaboration. Files are stored in Google Drive and can be exported in formats like PNG, JPEG, SVG, and PDF.

==== Google Vids ====
Google Vids is a tool to make demonstrative videos for workplaces and other types of videos. Users can create their own videos from scratch or prompt Google's Gemini AI model to generate a first draft.

==== Google Pics ====
At the 2026 Google I/O keynote in May, Google announced a Nano Banana–powered image-generation platform called Google Pics, part of the Google Workspace suite.

=== Google Calendar ===
Google Calendar is an online calendar intended to help keep track of time and schedules. It was launched in April 2006, and integrates with Gmail for users to easily add events from email messages directly to the calendar.

As part of Google Workspace, Google Calendar comes with additional features designed for business use, including:

- Smart scheduling of meetings, where the service finds available times and appropriate locations based on coworkers' schedules
- Public calendars for consumers to see a business's upcoming events
- Calendar integration with Google Sites
- Easy migration from Exchange, Outlook or iCal, or from .ics and .csv files
- Ability to see what meeting rooms and shared resources are available

=== Google Tasks ===
Google Tasks lets users capture and manage to-dos anywhere in Google Workspace or using iOS and Android apps. It began as a feature of Gmail and Calendar before launching as a standalone app in June 2018. It integrates directly with Google Calendar, and tasks can be created from emails in Gmail.

=== Google Chat ===
Google Chat is a communication software developed by Google built for teams that provides direct messages and team chat rooms, similar to competitors Slack and Microsoft Teams, along with a group messaging function that allows G Drive content sharing (Docs, Sheets, Slides).

It is one of two apps that constitute the replacement for Hangouts, the other being Meet. Although Google Hangouts remained part of Google Workspace, Google shut down Google Hangouts on November 1, 2022, and has since migrated all its users to Google Chat.

=== Google Meet ===
Google Meet is a standards-based Video Conferencing application, using proprietary protocols for video, audio and data transcoding. Google has partnered with Pexip to provide interoperability between the Google protocol and standards-based SIP/H.323 protocols to enable communications between Hangouts Meet and other Video Conferencing equipment and software.

=== Google Currents ===
Google Currents was a software application developed by Google for internal enterprise communication. Currents is a modified successor of Google+, which was shut down for consumers and brands on April 2, 2019.

As part of Google Workspace, Google Currents comes with additional features designed for business use, including enhanced privacy controls and restricted communities.

Google announced shutting down Google Currents on July 5, 2023, for business and education. Some content could be migrated to Google Chat.

=== Google Keep ===
Google Keep is a note-taking service with a variety of tools for notes, including text, lists, voice, and images.

Google Keep became part of Google Workspace in February 2017, and as part of Google Workspace, Google Keep comes with additional features designed for business use, including integration with Google Docs to easily access Keep notes while on Docs on the web.

=== Google Vault ===
Google Vault, an archiving and electronic discovery service exclusively available to Google Workspace customers, was announced on March 28, 2012.

Vault gives users "an easy-to-use and cost-effective solution for managing information critical to your business and preserving important data", with Google stating that it can "reduce the costs of Lawsuit, regulatory investigation and compliance actions" by saving and managing Gmail messages and chat logs with the ability to search and manage data based on filters, such as terms, dates, senders, recipients, and labels.

An update in June 2014 let Vault customers search, preview, copy, and export files in Google Drive.

=== Jamboard ===
In October 2016, Google announced Jamboard, the first hardware product designed for Google Workspace. Jamboard is a digital interactive whiteboard that enables collaborative meetings and brainstorming. The Jamboard is connected to the cloud, and enables people in different locations to work together in real-time through multiple Jamboards or connected remotely through a smartphone companion app. The Jamboard recognizes different touch inputs, such as using a stylus to sketch or eraser to start over, and does not require batteries or pairing. The Jamboard is a 55-inch 4K display with a built-in HD camera, speakers and Wi-Fi.

In October 2023, Google announced that Jamboard would be sunsetted at the end of 2024 as Google works to integrate third-party whiteboard tools including Figjam by Figma, Miro, and Lucidspark.

=== Google Workspace Marketplace ===
Google Workspace Marketplace (formerly Google Apps Marketplace and then G Suite Marketplace), launched in 2010, is an online store with business-oriented cloud applications that augment G Suite functionality. The Marketplace lets administrators browse for, purchase, and deploy integrated cloud applications. It comprises the Business Tools, Productivity, Education, Communication, and Utilities categories.

In September 2014, Google released a blog post saying that employees would be able to install third-party apps from the Marketplace without involving administrators.

=== Other functionality ===
Introduced in February 2017, "Google Cloud Search" enables a "unified search experience" in Google Workspace. Cloud Search lets users search for information across the entire G Suite product lineup. Users can also search for contacts, with results including the person's contact details, as well as events and files in common. The Cloud Search mobile app features "assist cards", described by Google as "a new way to help you find the right information at the right time. Using Google's machine intelligence technology, these cards can help you prepare for an upcoming meeting or even suggest files that need your attention". Google states that Cloud Search respects file-sharing permissions, meaning that users will only see results for files they have access to. The initial global roll-out of Cloud Search introduced the functionality for G Suite Business and Enterprise customers, with Google stating that more functionality will be added over time, including support for third-party applications.

Introduced in July 2017, Hire by Google was a job applications and management tool developed by Google to be used in combination with G Suite. The tool lets employers track job candidates' contact information, as well as résumés, calendar invitations, and allows for business partners to share feedback on candidates. Job applicants can choose what information to share with potential employers. The tool is designed for businesses based in the United States with fewer than 1,000 employees, and integrates with Google services, such as Gmail for sending messages, Calendar for tracking schedules, Sheets for overview of all candidates, and Hangouts for initial conversations. Google introduced Work Insights in September 2018 for administrators to see how departments are using Google products. In August 2019, Google announced that it would be shutting down Hire in September 2020, instead choosing to focus on "other products in the Google Cloud portfolio".

== Security and privacy ==
Google states that "we do not collect, scan or use your G Suite data for advertising purposes and do not display ads in G Suite, Education, or Government core services". Furthermore, it states that "the data that companies, schools and government agencies put into our G Suite services does not belong to Google. Whether it's corporate intellectual property, personal information or a homework assignment, Google does not own that data and Google does not sell that data to third parties."

Data is stored in Google's data centers, which are "built with custom-designed servers, that run our own operating system for security and performance", with "more than 550 full-time security and privacy professionals". In a blog post, Google stated that benefits of using G Suite included "disaster recovery", with data and information "simultaneously replicated in two data centers at once, so that if one data center fails, we nearly instantly transfer your data over to the other one that's also been reflecting your actions." Though acknowledging that "no backup solution from us or anyone else is absolutely perfect", Google states that it has "invested a lot of effort to help make it second to none".

Encryption, specifically AES 128-bit or stronger, is applied to data while stored at data centers, under transit between data centers and users, and between data centers.

At its introduction in June 2014, TechCrunch reported that Google Drive, as part of G Suite, offers "enterprise-grade security and compliance", including SSAE 16 / ISAE 3402 Type II, SOC 2-audit, ISO 27001 certification, adherence to the Safe Harbor Privacy Principles, and can support industry-specific requirements like Health Insurance Portability and Accountability Act (HIPAA). In October 2020, Google announced the new Business Plus pricing tier for Workspace that includes enhanced security features and controls like Vault and Advanced Endpoint Management, but not the full security options available in Enterprise editions of Workspace.

== Customers ==
As of April 2020, Google has 6 million businesses paying for G Suite, while it has 120 million G Suite for Education users.

In September 2014, Amit Singh, then-President of then-named Google for Work, stated that "60 percent of the Fortune 500" companies were paying for the service, with "more than 1,800 customers" signing up each week.

== Referral and partner programs ==
In March 2014, Google announced the Google Apps Referral Program in the United States and Canada. The program lets users receive money, coupons and other incentives by referring customers to G Suite.

In December 2014, Google introduced the Google for Work and Education Partner Program. The program combined existing, individual programs from Apps, Chrome, Cloud Platform, Maps, and Search into one overall program, and "allows partners to better sell, service and innovate across the Google for Work and Education suite of products and platforms".

== Geographic availability ==
Google Workspace is available in most countries and regions. However, Google restricts access to some of its business services in certain countries or regions, such as Crimea, Cuba, Iran, North Korea, and Syria. If anyone tries to sign in to these services from these countries or regions, they would get an error message.

== Reception ==
In an August 2011 review, PC World's Tony Bradley wrote that "the value of a rival platform such as Google Apps hinges on how compatible it is with Microsoft Office formatting conventions and file types", praising Google for having "gone to great lengths to improve fidelity with Microsoft Office, but it hasn't gone far enough", criticizing "many features" for being reformatted, including "tables of contents, footnotes, or inserted images". Bradley praised Google's collaborative apps, writing that it was "besting what Microsoft offers in 365". Regarding the price, he wrote that "Google's package is the best value. The annual pricing of $50 per user per year makes it about a third less per user per year than Office 365, yet it boasts equivalent functionality sufficient for most small and medium organizations".

Gary Marshall of TechRadar commented in 2016 that "Where Office tries to do everything imaginable, Google's suite is much more basic. That said, it's much more powerful than it was when the package debuted in 2006, but the emphasis on simplicity and speed remains." Marshall wrote that "We wouldn't want to craft a massive, complicated manuscript in Docs, but then that isn't what Docs is designed to do. It's a fast and user-friendly way to create everyday documents and to share them with colleagues and clients", and that fellow service Google Sheets "covers the most common Excel functions [...] but doesn't have the power of Microsoft's offering". Marshall praised collaboration for being "effortless", and praised importing of external file formats and making those editable and collaborative for being a "big selling point".

PCMag's Eric Grevstad wrote that "what's online is what you get", adding that "configuring them to [work offline] is a rigmarole". He stated that the package was "an illustration of software's version of the 80/20 rule [...] 80 percent of users will never need more than 20 percent of the features". He stated that "comparing [G Suite] to Office 2016 is like bringing a handgun to a cannon fight [...] Microsoft's PC-based suite is designed to have almost every feature anyone might ever need; Google's online suite is designed to have most features most people use daily."

Tom's Hardware's James Gaskin wrote that "like most Google products, it can claim the cleanest and most minimal interface in the market", and "No other suite except Office 365 can get close to the ease of collaboration Google provides. And even Microsoft's product trails by a wide margin as changes only appear in real-time in Word 2016, not the other apps". Conclusively, he wrote: "The progress made between the first Google App release and now has been considerable. As the world moves to more and more mobile computing, Google has a distinct advantage. But tradition dies hard, and those who build more than basic documents, spreadsheets, and presentations will remain tied to their desktops and laptops for the time being."

After Google+ was launched, many articles were published that emphasized that having a presence on Google+ helped with the business's Google search result rankings. Particularly public-facing Pages and +1 buttons were pushed as effective marketing strategies.

However, writing for The New York Times, Quentin Hardy said that "the sour grapes version is that Google Plus isn't getting anything like the buzz or traffic of Facebook, so Google is figuring out other ways to make the service relevant". However, Hardy did note that the integration between Google+ and other, more popular Google services, including Hangouts, meant "it's still early on, but it's easy to see how this could be an efficient way to bring workers to a virtual meeting, collaborate during it and embed in a calendar the future work commitments and follow-up that result".

=== Competitors ===
The key competitor to the Google suite is 365, Microsoft's cloud-based offering for businesses that includes similar products. The key differences are in the pricing plans, storage space and number of features.

As noted by TechRepublic in 2013, pricing plans differ in that "Google Apps has a quick and easy pricing plan for their standard Google Apps for Business package: $5 per user per month or $50 per user per year ... In contrast, Office 365 has a multitude of plans (six as of September, 2013) which can be both good and bad since it provides flexibility but also involves some complexity to figure out the best choice". Storage space varies because "Office 365 gives users 50 GB of space in Outlook and 1 TB in OneDrive. Google Apps provides 30 GB of space which is spread among Gmail, Drive and Picasa". And regarding features, it states that "Office 365 has the advantage for plenty of users who have been familiar with Word, Excel and the rest of the gang for years; there is less of a learning curve than with Google Apps if the latter represents a brand new experience ... However, it's also true that Office is notorious for being loaded with complex, unused features which can cause confusion, so the familiarity many will embrace also comes with something of a price, especially if companies are paying for advanced packages not all employees will use. By contrast, Google Apps programs are fairly easy to learn and intuitive, but may feel too awkward for those who are hard-coded to work in Office." Stephen Shankland of CNET wrote in 2014 that "It's hard to compare Google Apps' success to that of Microsoft Office since Google doesn't release revenue or user figures".

As of March 2016, Microsoft has 60 million commercial customers signed up for its Office 365 product offering, with "50,000 small business customers added to Office 365 each month".

== See also ==
- Comparison of office suites
- Google Cloud Platform
- Google Drive
- List of office suites
- Nextcloud — free and open source collaboration suite
- Online office suite
