= AppSheet =

No-code development platform

- Type: Subsidiary
- Industry: Platform as a service; Digital transformation; Enterprise software
- Founded: 2014; 12 years ago
- Headquarters: Seattle, Washington, U.S.
- Products: AppSheet platform
- Number of employees: Approximately 35 (2019)
- Parent: Google LLC
- Website: www.appsheet.com

AppSheet is a no-code development platform for application software, which allows users to create mobile, tablets, and web applications. It allows using data sources like Google Drive, DropBox, Office 365, and other cloud-based spreadsheet and database platforms. AppSheet can be utilized for a broad set of business use cases including project management, customer relationship management, field inspections, and personalized reporting. AppSheet was acquired by Google in January 2020.

== Platform ==
The AppSheet platform allows users to create mobile apps from cloud-based spreadsheets and databases. Apps can also be created directly as an add-on from spreadsheet platforms like Google Sheets. The platform is available from both a self-service model and a corporate licensing model for larger organizations with more governance, data analytics, and performance options. Compared to low-code development platforms which allow developers to develop with faster iteration cycles, AppSheet is a no-code platform which allows business users familiar with basic spreadsheet and database operations to build apps.

AppSheet compatible data sources include:

- Google Sheets
- Google Forms
- Microsoft Excel on Office 365
- Microsoft Excel on Dropbox
- Microsoft Excel on Box (company)
- Smartsheet
- Salesforce
- DreamFactory
- Microsoft SQL Server
- MySQL
- PostgreSQL
- Amazon DynamoDB

== Features ==
AppSheet Platform

=== Data Capture ===
AppSheet apps capture data in the form of images, signatures, geolocation, barcodes, and NFC. Data is automatically synced to the cloud, or users can opt to manually sync the data at any time. Common uses for data capture include field or equipment inspections, safety inspections, reporting, and inventory management.

=== Data Collaboration ===
Synced, shared data allows users to collaborate across mobile or desktop devices. Workflow rules can also be used to trigger notifications or work-based assignments where appropriate. Offline access is also possible as data storage is localized to the device and synced upon internet connectivity returns.

=== Data Display ===
AppSheet data can be displayed in graphical and interactive formats. Common data views include tables, forms, maps, charts, calendars, and dashboards. Each app can hold multiple views consisting of data from various sources.

=== Declarative Programming Model ===
AppSheet's platform allows users to declare the logic of the app's activity in order to customize the app's user experience rather than use traditional code. This level of abstraction essentially trades a granular level of customization that would be available through hard code for increased efficiency, scalability, and security that would be available through a declarative model.

== History ==
AppSheet was originally founded by Praveen Seshadri in March 2014 after several months of developing the product at his home in Seattle, Washington.

In 2015, AppSheet received seed funding from New Enterprise Associates.

In 2018, AppSheet launched SPEC, a natural-language programming tool allowing non-coders to build apps by asking users in plain English what they want to build.

On January 14, 2020, AppSheet announced it had been acquired by Google and would be joining the Google Cloud team.
