= Quickoffice =

Discontinued freeware proprietary productivity suite for mobile devices

Quickoffice, Inc.
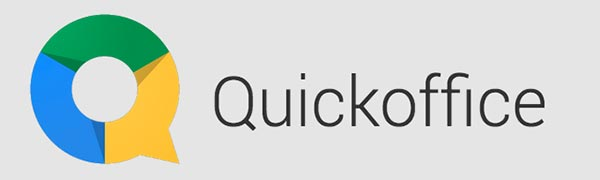
- 2012 logo

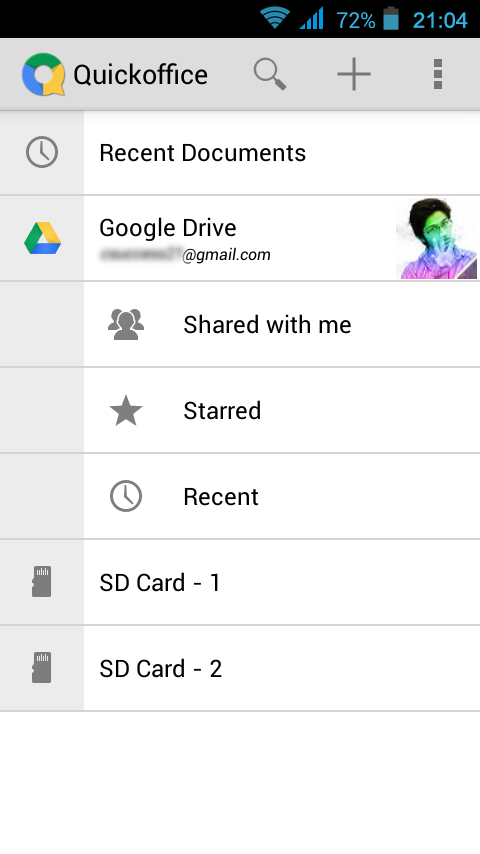
- Quickoffice on Android OS
- Developers: Cutting Edge Software (1997–2004); Quickoffice, Inc. (2004–2012); Google (2012–2014)
- Final release: Android: Varies with device: / 14 February 2014; 12 years ago iOS: 6.1.4 / 6 January 2014; 12 years ago
- Operating system: Android; BlackBerry OS; HP webOS; iOS; Palm OS; Symbian
- License: Proprietary
- Website: quickoffice.com (redirects to Google Docs)

Quickoffice, Inc. is a discontinued freeware proprietary productivity suite for mobile devices which allows viewing, creating and editing documents, presentations and spreadsheets. It consists of Quickword (a word processor), Quicksheet (a spreadsheet), QuickPoint (a presentation program) and QuickPDF (a PDF viewer). The programs are compatible with Microsoft Office file formats, but not the OpenDocument file format.

Quickoffice was commonly used on smartphones and tablets. It was the main office editing suite on Symbian OS where it first appeared in 2005 and last updated in 2011, and came pre-loaded on all devices. It was released for Android in 2010. There was a project to port Quickoffice to Chromebooks in February 2013, and the port released as a Chrome extension named "Office Editing for Docs, Sheets, and Slides."

== History ==
Quickoffice, Inc., a company in Plano, Texas, was founded as Cutting Edge Software Inc. by Jeff Musa in 1997, offering Microsoft Office and Excel compatibility for mobile devices. It developed the Quicksheet spreadsheet for Palm OS, and the free QuickOffice and paid-for QuickOffice Pro and QuickOffice Pro HD apps. Its flagship products Quicksheet and SmartDoc both won "Best in Class" honors for 1998 and 1999 by Tap Magazine. Cutting Edge Software was acquired by Mobility Electronics in 2002 for an undisclosed sum and operated as a wholly owned subsidiary until it was sold to Mobile Digital Media in 2004, when that firm changed the name to Quickoffice, Inc. prior to the sale of the Mobile Digital Media business in 2005.

On June 5, 2012, Google acquired Quickoffice, Inc., along with its team of developers, for an undisclosed sum. Google re-released Quickoffice, as a free app on September 19, 2013, and includes it with its Android operating system from version 4.4 KitKat.

After having integrated the features of Quickoffice into its own Google Docs Editors suite, on 29 June 2014, Google announced that Quickoffice would be discontinued, and had since been removed from the Google Play Store and App Store.

== See also ==
- Google Drive
- Google Docs
- Google Sheets
- Google Slides
- Polaris Office
- List of mobile and tablet office suites
- List of office suites
- Comparison of office suites
- List of word processors
- Comparison of word processors
