= Google Docs Editors =

Cloud-based office suite

- Developer: Google
- Release: March 9, 2006; 20 years ago
- Written in: JavaScript, Java
- Operating system: Android, iOS, macOS, ChromeOS, Windows
- Platform: Web application
- Available in: 100 languages
- Type: Office suite; Collaborative software
- Website: google.com/docs

Google Docs Editors is a web-based productivity office suite offered by Google within its Google Drive service. The suite includes:

- Google Docs (word processor)
- Google Sheets (spreadsheet)
- Google Slides (presentation software)
- Google Drawings (vector drawing program)
- Google Forms (online forms, quizzes and surveys)
- Google Sites (graphical website editor)
- Google Keep (note-taking application)
- Google Vids (AI video editor; currently in beta testing)
- Google My Maps (custom map making program)

It used to also include Google Jamboard and Google Fusion Tables until Fusion Tables was discontinued in 2019 and Jamboard was discontinued in 2024. The Google Docs Editors suite is available freely for users with personal Google accounts: through a web application, a set of mobile apps for Android and iOS, and a desktop application for Google's ChromeOS. It is also available to enterprise customers utilizing Google Workspace and individuals at educational institutions through Workspace for Education.

== Availability ==
The Google Docs Editors suite is available free of charge for users with personal Google accounts. It is also offered as part of Google's business-centered service, Google Workspace.

== Competition ==
The suite mainly competes with Microsoft Office and iWork software suites. It pioneered real-time collaborative editing since its inception in 2006, while Microsoft Office introduced it in 2013.

The suite can open and save files in Microsoft Office file formats like .docx, .xlsx and .pptx. Microsoft Office is a paid suite of productivity apps while Google Docs Editors Suite is available for free to users with private Google accounts. It is also offered as part of Google's business-oriented Google Workspace service, which ran until October 2020 under the name G Suite, a monthly subscription service that unlocks additional features.

== See also ==
- List of collaborative software
- List of office suites
- Comparison of office suites
- Microsoft Office
- Microsoft 365
- iWork
