= Samsung Flip =

Smartphone released in 2018

- Developer: Samsung Electronics
- Manufacturer: Samsung Electronics
- Type: Interactive whiteboard
- Released: Flip: January 2018; Flip 2: 2019; Flip 3: 2021; Flip Pro: 2022
- Operating system: Tizen
- System on a chip: Samsung Exynos
- CPU: Quad Core ARM Cortex-A72 1.7GHz
- Memory: Flip: 3GB LPDDR4
- Storage: Flip 3: 16GB; Flip Pro: 32GB
- Display: 55" Ultra HD; 65" Ultra HD; 75" Ultra HD; 85" Ultra HD
- Input: Touch, stylus
- Dimensions: Flip Pro: 1,297.4–1,945.8 mm (51.08–76.61 in) (width); 768.2–1,151.1 mm (30.24–45.32 in) (height); 59.9–89 mm (2.36–3.50 in) (depth)
- Weight: Flip Pro: 28.6–75.2 kg (63–166 lb)
- Website: displaysolutions.samsung.com/digital-signage/e-board/flip

The Samsung Flip (stylized as SΛMSUNG Fl!p) is an interactive whiteboard developed by Samsung Electronics released in January 2018. The device was announced during Samsung's keynote speech at CES 2018, with planned distribution in the United States and Europe. It consists of a screen available in sizes of 55", 65", 75", or 85" and a dual-sided stylus pen. Accessories are available to either mount the display on the wall or attach it on a height-adjustable moving stand. The Samsung Flip is aimed at enterprise clients, similar to the Jamboard and Surface Hub.

== Succeeding versions ==
Its second iteration, Samsung Flip 2, was released in 2019. It features enhanced annotation, flexible image editing, pen options, brush mode for painting, built-in browser, and an optional connectivity tray with HDMI and USB functionalities. Additionally, it allows remote management through Samsung's MagicINFO content management system.

Its third iteration, Samsung Flip 3, was released in 2021. It features enhanced screen protection and larger built-in memory of 16 GB.

Its fourth and current iteration, Samsung Flip Pro, was released in 2022.
