= Lucidchart =

Web application for collaborative diagrams

- Developer: Lucid Software Inc.
- Initial release: December 2008; 17 years ago
- Platform: Web-based
- Available in: English
- Type: Diagramming software
- License: Free and paid subscriptions
- Website: www.lucidchart.com (lucid.co)

Lucidchart is a web-based diagramming application that allows users to visually collaborate on drawing, revising and sharing charts and diagrams, and improve processes, systems, and organizational structures. It is produced by Lucid Software Inc., based in Utah, United States and co-founded by Ben Dilts and Karl Sun.

== History ==
In January 2011, Lucid Software Inc. was incorporated in Delaware through the conversion of Lucidchart, LLC, a Utah limited liability company formed in April 2009. In 2010, Lucid announced that it had integrated Lucidchart into the Google Apps Marketplace.

In 2011, Lucid raised $1 million in seed funding from 500 Startups, 2M Companies, K9 Ventures, and several angel investors.

On October 17, 2018, Lucid announced it had raised an additional $72 million from Meritech Capital, Spectrum Equity and ICONIQ Capital.

In 2020, Lucid launched a digital whiteboarding capability called Lucidspark.

In 2021, Lucid launched a digital cloud visualization capability called Lucidscale.

In 2025, the University of California, Santa Cruz announced that its centralized Lucidchart license would end in early 2026 due to cost and usage levels. Users were advised to export files or obtain individual subscriptions.

== Features ==
Lucidchart is entirely browser-based, running on browsers that support HTML5. This means it does not require plugins or updates of a third-party software like Adobe Flash. The platform supports real-time collaboration, allowing all users to work simultaneously on projects and see each user’s additions reflected in real time. All data is encrypted and stored in secure data centers.

Additional features include:

- A drag-and-drop interface
- Real-time co-authoring, shape-specific comments, and collaborative cursors
- Data linking
- Auto-visualization to generate org charts and ERDs
- SQL import and export capabilities

Lucidchart also supports importing files from draw.io, Gliffy, OmniGraffle, and Microsoft Visio. The platform is integrated with Google Workspace and Drive, Microsoft Teams and other Office products, Atlassian’s Jira and Confluence, Salesforce, GitHub, Slack, and others.
