= Google Videos (disambiguation) =

Google Videos is a function within Google Search for searching online videos.

Google Videos may also refer to:

- Google Video, a video-sharing platform launched in 2005
- Google Vids, a presentation program launched in 2024
- Google Video Marketplace, a digital media store launched in 2006

== See also ==
- YouTube, a video-sharing platform launched in 2005
- VideoPoet, a large language model launched in 2023
- WebM, a file format launched in 2010
- VP9, a video coding format launched in 2013
