= Google Sync =

File synchronization service from Google

- Developer: Google
- Release: February 9, 2009 (17 years ago); discontinued: December 2012 (13 years ago)
- Website: google.com/sync

Google Sync was a file synchronization service from Google that provided over-the-air synchronization of Gmail, Google Contacts, and Google Calendar with PC and mobile device Mail, Calendar and Address Book applications. It used Microsoft Exchange ActiveSync to let service users synchronize their Google Apps mail, contacts, and calendars to their mobile devices, wherein the users can also set up or customize the alerts for incoming messages and upcoming meetings. Google Sync worked with PC, Mac, Linux, Android, BlackBerry, Symbian S60, iPhone, iPad, Windows Mobile, and other devices. Google Sync was announced in February 2009 and discontinued for non-business users in December 2012.

== Features ==
Google Sync was a bidirectional service. Changes made on one device would be backed up to the user's Google Account. All other Google data on devices sharing that same Google account would be automatically synchronized as well. In case the user's Mobile Device is lost, the data is still securely stored.

Google Sync provided over-the-air synchronization for many Android, iOS, BlackBerry, Palm, Pocket PC devices and with Microsoft Outlook.

- Android - choose to back up and sync any combination of Gmail, People, or Calendar. Setup
- iPhone, iPad, iPod Touch, or Windows Mobile - choose to sync any combination of Mail, Contacts, or Calendar. Setup
- BlackBerry - choose to sync Google Contacts and Google Calendar to the built-in Address Book and Calendar applications. Setup
- Most other mobile phones - Wireless synchronization of Google Contacts to the built-in Address Book application. Setup

== See also ==
- Gmail
- Google Cloud Connect to sync from Microsoft Office Documents
