= Google Forms =

Cloud-based survey software

- Screenshot An example of a contact information form in Google Forms
- Developer: Google
- Platform: Web application
- Type: Collaborative software Web survey
- Website: docs.google.com/forms
- Repository: github.com/googleworkspace

Google Forms is a survey administration software included as part of the free, web-based Google Docs Editors suite offered by Google. The service also includes Google Docs, Google Sheets, Google Slides, Google Drawings, Google Sites, and Google Keep. Google Forms is only available as a web application. The app allows users to create and edit surveys online while collaborating with other users in real-time. The collected information can be automatically entered into a survey.

Google Forms was first introduced in 2008 as part of the Google Docs suite inside the Google Spreadsheets. Over the years, it has received numerous updates and feature additions, keeping pace with the evolving needs of users.

Google Forms was launched on November 15, 2010.

== Features ==
The Google Forms service has undergone several updates over the years. Features include, but are not limited to, menu search, shuffle of questions for randomized order, limiting responses to once per person, shorter URLs, custom themes, automatically generating answer suggestions when creating forms, an "Upload file" option for users answering questions that require them to share content or files from their computer or Google Drive, and many more.

In October 2014, Google introduced add-ons for Google Forms that enable third-party developers to add new features to surveys, while in July 2017, Google updated Forms to add several new features. "Intelligent response validation" is capable of detecting text input in form fields to identify what is written and ask the user to correct the information if wrongly input. Depending on file-sharing settings in Google Drive, users can request file uploads from individuals outside multi-option answers in a table. In Settings, users can make changes that affect all new forms, such as always collecting email addresses.

Users can analyze responses to their form using either the built-in analysis tools, or export them to a new or existing Google Sheets spreadsheet that updates as new responses are received. The built-in analysis tools allow for responses to be viewed individually or in summary. Alternatively, responses can be downloaded as a comma-separated values file. Google Forms can also use Gemini to summarize responses through AI.

Google Forms features all of the collaboration and sharing features found in Docs, Sheets, Slides, Drawings, and Sites.

== See also ==
- Microsoft Forms
- Jotform
