= Google Drawings =

Cloud-based diagram making software

- An example of a drawing in Google Drawings
- Developer: Google
- Initial release: April 12, 2010; 16 years ago
- Platform: Web application, Chrome app
- Available in: English
- Type: Diagramming software
- Website: docs.google.com/drawings

Google Drawings is a diagram making tool included as part of Google Workspace. Google Drawings is available as a web application and as a desktop application on ChromeOS. The app allows users to create and edit flowcharts and other types of diagrams online while collaborating with other users in real-time.

== Functionality ==
Google Drawings allows importing images from the computer or from the web as well as inserting shapes, arrows, scribbles and text from predefined templates. Objects can be moved, resized and rotated. The software also allows for basic editing of images, including cropping, applying masks and adding borders. Unlike many of the other software in the Google Docs Editors suite, Google Drawings does not have its own dedicated home, as visiting the Google Drawings URL creates a new document.

Drawings can be inserted into other Google documents, spreadsheets, or presentations. They can also be published online as images or downloaded in standard formats such as JPEG, SVG, PNG, or PDF.

== History ==
On April 17, 2007, Google acquired Tonic Systems. In 2009, Google published an article on the "Insert Drawing" feature of Google Docs, crediting its creation to Tonic.

Google Drawings was originally introduced on April 12, 2010, as Google Docs Drawings.

On August 1, 2011, Google announced that users would be able to copy and paste graphic elements between different Google Drawings.

On January 7, 2019, Google added embeds of Google Drawings files to Google Docs.
