= Jamboard =

Digital whiteboard developed by Google

- Also known as: Google Jamboard
- Developer: Google
- Manufacturer: Google
- Product family: Google Workspace
- Type: Interactive whiteboard
- Released: May 23, 2017
- Discontinued: December 31, 2024
- Display: 55" 4K (60 Hz)
- Input: Stylus; eraser; touch
- Camera: HD camera
- Online services: Google Workspace
- Website: jamboard.google.com; workspace.google.com/products/jamboard/

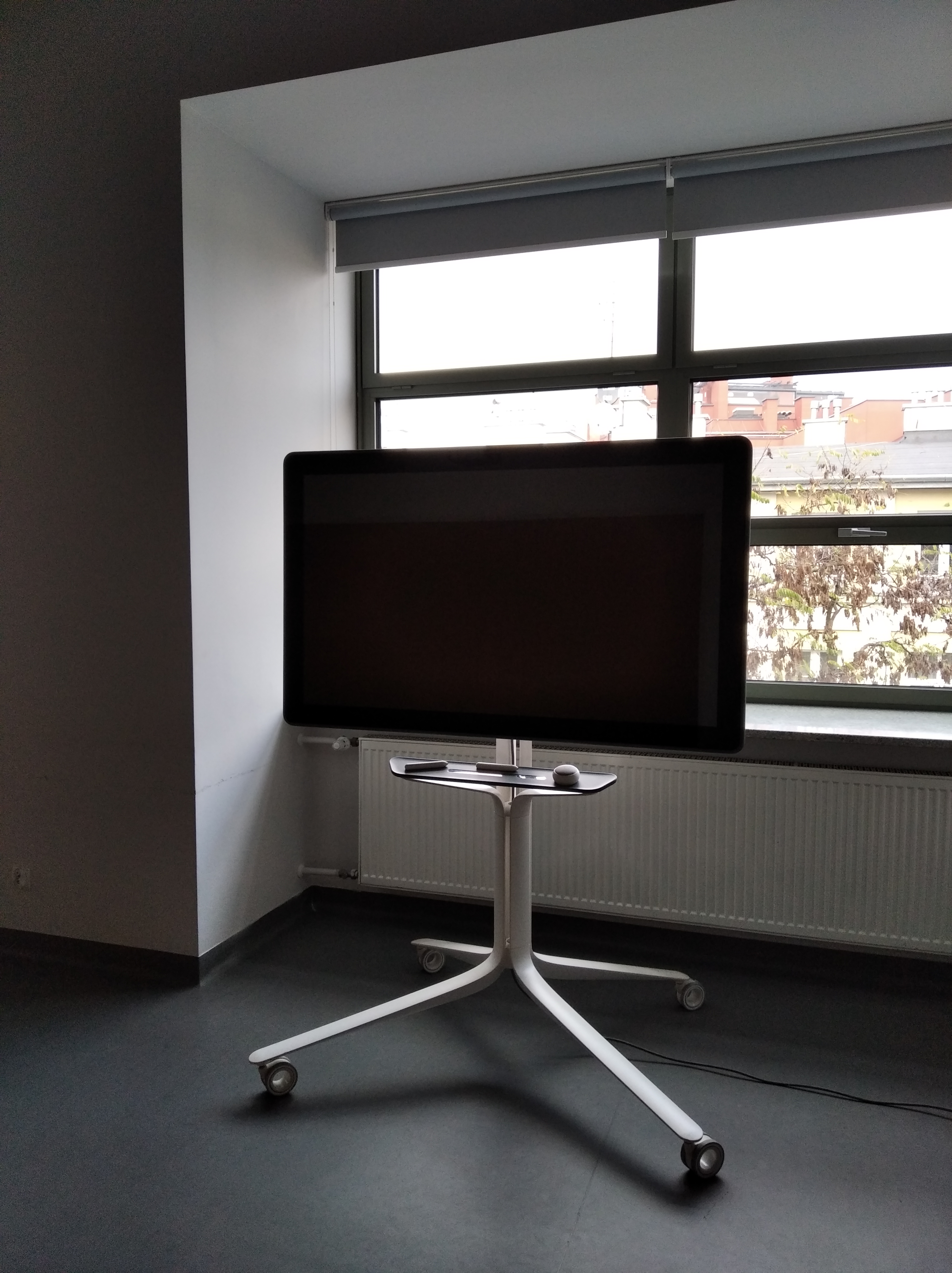
Jamboard at SWPS University

Jamboard was a digital interactive whiteboard developed by Google to work with Google Workspace, formerly known as G Suite. It was officially announced on 25 October 2016. It had a 55" 4K touchscreen physical display and could be used for online collaboration using Google Workspace. The display could also be mounted onto a wall or be configured into a stand. Jamboard was discontinued on December 31, 2024.

== History ==
After Google Apps for Work was launched in 2006, the subscription-based service was announced to be re-branded as G Suite on 29 September 2016, alongside announcements of machine learning integration into Drive's programs, a redesign of Hangouts and the announcement of Team Drive.

On 25 October 2016, Product Manager of G Suite TJ Varghese announced Jamboard on Google's official blog. The announcement trailer for the product was released the same day onto YouTube. The website was also launched on the same day simultaneously, as well as a rumored version of an "Early Adopter Program" for the device. Jamboard was officially released in May 2017.

On September 28, 2023, Google announced they planned to shut down Jamboard after December 31, 2024; three months before the shutdown, Jamboard became view-only.

== Hardware ==
Technical specifications
Display Size	55"
Display Quality	4K
Display Refresh Rate	60 Hz
Display Touch Capabilities	Up to 16 points
Wi-Fi	Yes
Clear scanner	HD front-facing camera
Microphone	Built-In Microphone
Speakers	Built-In Speakers
Stylus	Dedicated Stylus
Eraser	Eraser [Digital]
Main Controller	Ability to open a 'Jam'

=== Operating system ===
Jamboard had an operating system that coincided with the Google Workspace ecosystem. Any service compatible with Google Workspace could also be performed on the device.

== Online service ==
Jamboard, more commonly known as Google Jamboard in this use case, was also available as a service to anyone with a Google account.

Once on the landing page, a user was able to create a 'Jam' where they were able to draw, create shapes, add lines, images, and text. The user could also choose between four pen types and six colors. Tools were also provided to erase and move objects, create digital sticky notes, and turn their touchpoint into a digital laser pointer.

== Shutdown ==
Google announced on September 28, 2023, that Jamboard would shut down after December 31, 2024. Google claimed that the reason behind the shutdown is the abundance of better, more capable alternatives. Users had to export Jamboard files they wished to keep before all Jam data was permanently deleted on December 31, 2024. Physical Jamboard devices would still continue to work as a whiteboard without online functionality after October 1, 2024.
