= Google Sheets =

Cloud-based spreadsheet software

- Screenshot of a Google Sheets spreadsheet
- Developer: Google LLC
- Release: March 9, 2006; 20 years ago

Stable release(s)
- Android: 1.26.453 / November 4, 2026; 13 days ago
- iOS (Note: Including iPadOS): 1.2026.45104 / November 10, 2026; 7 days ago
- Google Chrome: 1.111.1 / October 19, 2026; 29 days ago
- Written in: JavaScript
- Operating system: Android 8+; iOS 17+; ChromeOS; Discontinued: iOS 16 (2026); iOS 15 (2024); Android 7, iOS 14 (2023); iOS 13 (2022); Android 6, iOS 12 (2021); iOS 11 (2020); Android 5 (2019); Android KitKat (2018); Android Jelly Bean (2017); Android Ice Cream Sandwich (2015)
- Available in: 83 languages
- Type: Collaborative software; Spreadsheet
- Website: google.com/sheets
- Repository: github.com/googleworkspace

Google Sheets is a spreadsheet program included as part of the free, web-based Google Docs Editors suite offered by Google. Google Sheets is available as a web application, as mobile apps for Android and iOS, and as a desktop application on ChromeOS. The service is compatible with Microsoft Excel file formats.

Like other Google Docs Editors, Sheets allows users to create and edit files online while collaborating with other users in real time. Edits are tracked through revision history, which records which user made each change. Active collaborators are indicated with editor-specific colors and cursors, and a permissions system controls what different users can do. Updates have introduced features that use machine learning, including "Explore", which answers natural language questions about data in a spreadsheet. Sheets is one of the Google Workspace services provided by Google alongside Google Docs, Google Slides, Google Drawings, Google Forms, Google Sites and Google Keep.

== History ==
Google Sheets originated from XL2Web, a web-based spreadsheet application developed by 2Web Technologies, founded by Jonathan Rochelle and Farzad "Fuzzy" Khosrowshahi. XL2Web was acquired by Google in 2006 and turned into Google Labs Spreadsheets. It was launched as a test for a limited number of users, on a first-come, first-served basis on June 6, 2006. The limited test was later replaced with a beta version available to all Google Account holders, around the same time as an official announcement press release was issued.

In March 2010, Google acquired the online document collaboration company DocVerse. DocVerse allowed multiple-user online collaboration on Excel-compatible documents as well as other Microsoft Office formats such as Microsoft Word and Microsoft PowerPoint. Improvements based on DocVerse were announced and deployed in April 2010. In June 2012, Google acquired Quickoffice, a freeware proprietary productivity suite for mobile devices. In October 2012, Google Spreadsheets was renamed Google Sheets and a Google Chrome app was released that provided shortcuts to Sheets on Chrome's new tab page.

== Platforms ==
Google Sheets is available as a web application supported on the web browsers Google Chrome, Microsoft Edge, Firefox, and Safari. Users can access all spreadsheets, among other files, collectively through the Google Drive website. In June 2014, Google rolled out a dedicated website homepage for Sheets that contain only files created with Sheets. In 2014, Google launched a dedicated mobile app for Sheets on the Android and iOS mobile operating systems. In 2015, the mobile website for Sheets was updated with a "simpler, more uniform" interface. While users can read spreadsheets through the mobile websites, users trying to edit will be redirected towards the mobile app to eliminate editing on the mobile web.

Apps Script

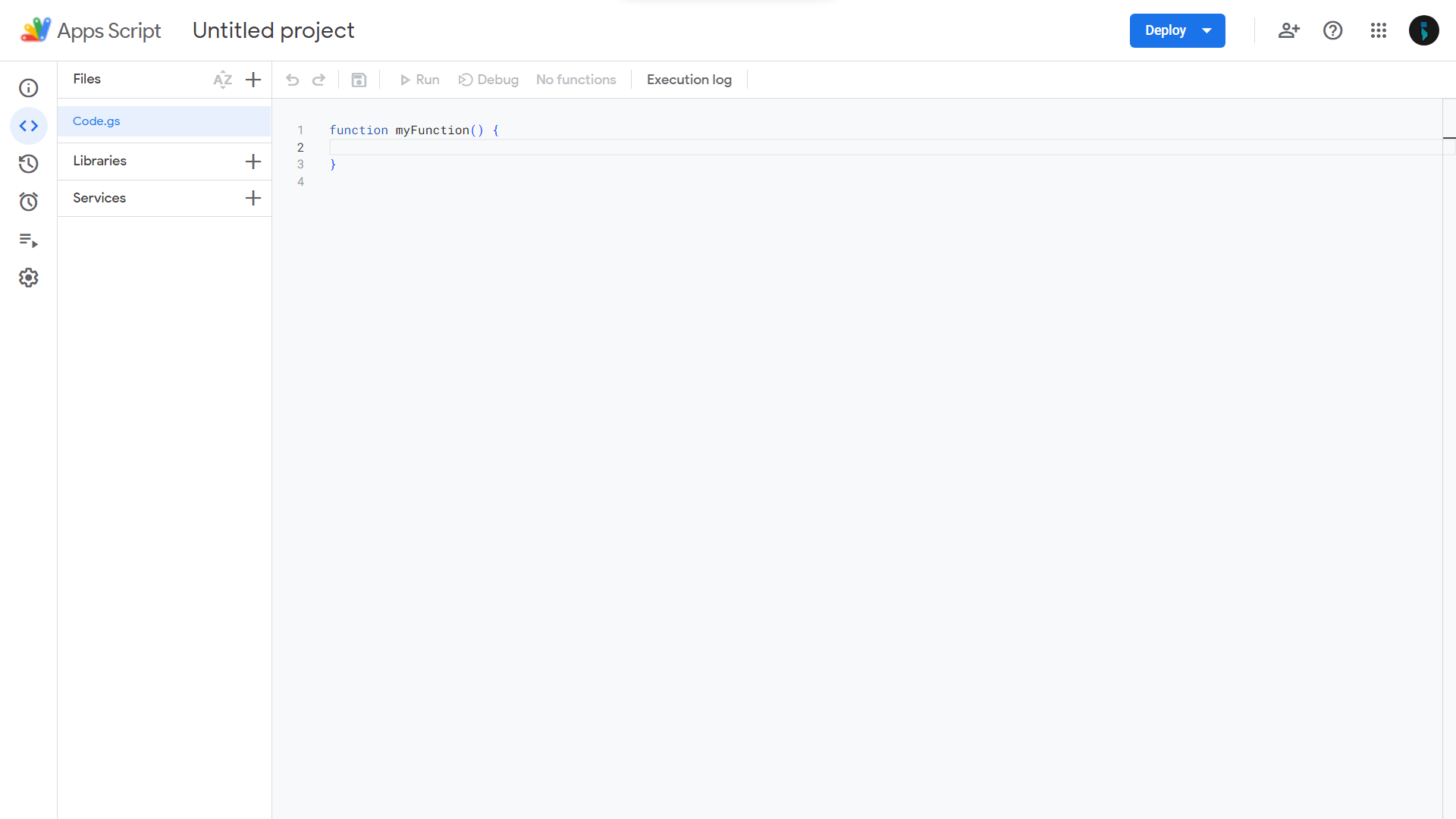
- Developer: Google
- Release: August 19, 2009; 17 years ago
- Written in: JavaScript
- Type: Web application framework, scripting language
- Website: script.google.com
- Repository: github.com/googleworkspace

== Features ==
=== Editing ===
==== Collaboration and revision history ====
Google Sheets serves as a collaborative tool for cooperative editing of spreadsheets in real time. Documents can be shared, opened, and edited by multiple users simultaneously and users can see character-by-character changes as other collaborators make edits. Changes are automatically saved to Google's servers and a revision history is automatically kept so past edits may be viewed and reverted to. An editor's current position is represented with an editor-specific color/cursor, so if another editor happens to be viewing that part of the document they can see edits as they occur. A sidebar chat functionality allows collaborators to discuss edits. The revision history allows users to see the additions made to a document, with each author distinguished by color. Only adjacent revisions can be compared and users cannot control how frequently revisions are saved. Files can be exported to a user's local computer in a variety of formats such as PDF and Office Open XML. Sheets supports tagging for archival and organizational purposes.

==== Explore ====
Launched for the entire Drive suite in September 2016, "Explore" enables additional functionality through machine learning. In Google Sheets, Explore enables users to ask questions, such as "How many units were sold on Black Friday?" and Explore will return the answer, without requiring formula knowledge from the user. In June 2017, Google expanded the Explore feature in Google Sheets to automatically build charts and visualize data and again expanded it in December to feature machine learning capable of automatically creating pivot tables. In October 2016, Google announced the addition of "Action items" to Sheets. If a user assigns a task within a Sheet, the service will intelligently assign that action to the designated user. Google states this will make it easier for other collaborators to visualize who is responsible for a task. When a user visits Google Drive or Sheets, any files containing tasks assigned to them will be highlighted with a badge. In March 2014, Google introduced add-ons; new tools from third-party developers that add more features for Google Sheets.

==== Gemini ====
Since late 2025, Gemini has been integrated into Google Sheets, allowing for creation of tables, formulas, generate data analysis and insights, building charts and graphs, summarizing emails and files from Drive and Gmail as well as performing actions like applying conditional formatting, creating pivot tables, adding a dropdown or checkbox, sorting, applying, or clearing a filter, finding and replacing text, setting a number format, inserting, deleting, or freezing rows and columns, filling a range and formatting a table, all with the help of the LLM tool.

==== Offline editing ====
To view and edit spreadsheets offline on a computer, users need to be using the Chromium-based web browser (e.g., Google Chrome, Microsoft Edge). A Chrome extension, Google Docs Offline, allows users to enable offline support for Sheets and other Drive suite files on the Google Drive website. The Android and iOS apps natively support offline editing.

=== Files ===
==== Supported file formats and limits ====
Files in the following formats can be viewed and converted to the Sheets format: .xls (if newer than Microsoft Office 95), .xlsx, .xlsm, .xlt, .xltx, .xltm .ods, .csv, .tsv, .txt and .tab. Overall document size is capped at 10 million cells.

=== Google Workspace ===
The Sheets app and the rest of the Google Docs Editors suite are free to use for individuals, but Sheets is also available as part of the business-centered Google Workspace (formerly G Suite) service by Google, which is a monthly subscription that enables additional business-focused functionality.

=== Integration with Charts and Wikipedia ===
Sheets can produce Google Charts and has a third-party plugin which allows for integration with Wikipedia.

=== Other functionality ===
A simple find and replace tool is available. The service includes a web clipboard tool that allows users to copy and paste content between Google Sheets and Google Docs, Google Slides, and Google Drawings. The web clipboard can also be used for copying and pasting content between different computers. Copied items are stored on Google's servers for up to 30 days.

Google offers an extension for the Google Chrome web browser called Office editing for Docs, Sheets and Slides that enables users to view and edit Microsoft Excel documents on Google Chrome, via the Google Sheets app. The extension can be used for opening Excel files stored on the computer using Chrome, as well as for opening files encountered on the web (in the form of email attachments, web search results, etc.) without having to download them. The extension is installed on ChromeOS by default. As of June 2019, this extension is no longer required since the functionality exists natively.

Google Cloud Connect was a plug-in for Microsoft Office 2003, 2007, and 2010 that could automatically store and synchronize any Excel document to Google Sheets (before the introduction of Drive). The online copy was automatically updated each time the Microsoft Excel document was saved. Microsoft Excel documents could be edited offline and synchronized later when online. Google Cloud Connect maintained previous Microsoft Excel document versions and allowed multiple users to collaborate by working on the same document at the same time. However, Google Cloud Connect has been discontinued as of April 30, 2013, as, according to Google, Google Drive achieves all of the above tasks, "with better results".

While Microsoft Excel retains the 1900 leap year bug, Google Sheets 'fixes' this bug by increasing the number code for all dates before March 1, 1900, so entering "0" and formatting it as a date returns December 30, 1899. On the other hand, Excel interprets "0" as meaning December 31, 1899, which is formatted to read January 0, 1900.

Launched in December 2022, Simple ML is Google's add-on for machine learning.

Several password management companies highlighted a trend for using Google Sheets to store passwords in spreadsheet format. Both Keeper Security and LastPass recommended against using Sheets in this way, due to the spreadsheet only being "as secure as the Google accounts that own and have access" to them. Keeper highlighted the lack of end-to-end encryption, despite all Google data, including Sheets, using AES-256 encryption. A data study conducted by students at Cardiff University found that participants would not trust a password manager with their bank details or passport information, due to implied security concerns. However, stated an ease of use with programs such as Google Docs, Sheets being a part of this.

== See also ==
- Google Drive
- LibreOffice
