= Google Page Creator =

Website creation and hosting service by Google

- Website type: Multimedia Internet publishing
- Creator: Google
- Website: pages.google.com (defunct)

Google Page Creator was a website creation and hosting service by Google launched in beta in 2006. It was a tool for basic website design, requiring no HTML or CSS knowledge. Users just had to login to their Gmail account and got 100MB of hosting space and a Gmail-derived domain name and the service was completely free.

In September 2008, Google announced that it would not accept new sign-ups to Page Creator, instead encouraging users to use Google Sites. The service was shut down in 2009, whilst existing published pages migrated to Google Sites.

The Page Creator Beta allowed non-professionals a way to host and publish their pages. However, it was limited to basic features such as templates and HTML editing, rather than tools such as message boards, chats, or blogs.

== See also ==
- Blogger (service)
