= Google Cloud Connect =

Cloud computing plug-in for Microsoft Office

- Developer: Google
- Operating system: Microsoft Windows
- Platform: Microsoft Office 2003, 2007 and 2010

Google Cloud Connect was a free cloud computing plug-in for Windows Microsoft Office 2003, 2007 and 2010 that can automatically store and synchronize any Microsoft Word document, PowerPoint presentation, or Excel spreadsheet to Google Docs in Google Docs or Microsoft Office formats. The Google Doc copy is automatically updated each time the Microsoft Office document is saved. Microsoft Office documents can be edited offline and synchronized later when online. Google Cloud Sync maintains previous Microsoft Office document versions and allows multiple users to collaborate, working on the same document at the same time. Google Cloud Connect was discontinued on April 30, 2013, as according to Google, all of Cloud Connect's features are available through Google Drive.

== Features ==
Google Cloud Connect could automatically or manually synchronize changes made to a Microsoft Office 2003, 2007, or 2010 document with Google Docs. Documents can be secured for private access by one user, shared with specific people for collaboration, or made public to anyone. Previous document versions can be retrieved.

- Backup: Microsoft Office documents could be manually or automatically backed up to Google Docs each time they are saved locally. Video
- Synchronize: Changes made to an Office document on one computer can sync when the file is opened on another computer. Video
- Protect: Microsoft Office documents synced to Google Docs can be made accessible to one person.
- Share: Microsoft Office documents synced to Google Docs can be made accessible only to selected people. Video
- Edit: A shared document can be set to only be viewed by others or edited as well. Video
- Publish: Documents synced to Google Docs can effectively be published by making them accessible to anyone.
- Collaborate: Multiple users can work on the same document at the same time. Video
- Notify: When one person edits a document, others sharing the document receive an email letting them know. Video
- Print: Use Google Cloud Print to print to local or remote network connected printers.
- Compare: Previous version are maintained allowing users to compare to older versions. Video
- Roll back: Users can return to a previous version of the document.
- Green: Green computing allows documents to be shared without printing or sending large files. Only links need be sent.
- Mobilize: Google Sync allows synced documents to be viewed and edited with most internet connected mobile devices.
- Storage: 5GB of Google Drive storage is included for free. Currently, additional storage costs per month are: 25GB-$2.49, 100GB-$4.99, etc. up to 16TB.

== See also ==
- Cloud computing security
- Cloud collaboration
