= Google Contacts =

Contact management tool from Google

- Screenshot The web version of Google Contacts
- Developer: Google
- Release: 2007; 19 years ago (as part of Gmail); 2010; 16 years ago (standalone app)

Stable release(s) [±]
- Android: 4.86.23 (Build 966666027) / August 18, 2026; 20 days ago
- Wear OS: 1.112 (Build 967302061) / August 27, 2026; 11 days ago
- Operating system: Android 10+; web; Wear OS; Discontinued: Android 8, 9 (2025); Android 6, 7 (2023); Android 5 (2019)
- Size: 21 MB
- Type: Contact management
- Website: contacts.google.com

Google Contacts is a contact management service developed by Google. It is available as an Android mobile app, a web app, or on the sidebar of Gmail as part of Google Workspace.

== History ==
Google Contacts originated as the built-in contacts manager in Gmail, which was introduced in 2007. It was later released as an Android app for Nexus devices in 2010, before it became available for all Android phones in 2015. A standalone web application was released the same year, featuring a revamped user interface. It returned to Gmail in the form of a sidebar in 2020 as part of Google Workspace.

== Interpolation ==
The service can also be synchronized with Apple's Contacts app on iOS and Samsung's Contacts app on Galaxy. It could also be synced with Google Sync before its discontinuation.

== Reception ==
In 2011, with the introduction of higher-density screens and larger internal memories on Android devices, Google Contacts was heavily criticized for only supporting lower-resolution photos in Android Jelly Bean. This limitation was lifted the following year.

== See also ==
- List of personal information managers
- Outlook.com#People
