= Google Workspace Marketplace =

Software application marketplace

- Owner: Google
- Website: workspace.google.com/marketplace/
- Commercial: Yes
- Launched: 9 March 2010; 16 years ago (as Google Apps Marketplace)
- Current status: Active
- Content license: Proprietary

Google Workspace Marketplace (formerly Google Apps Marketplace and then G Suite Marketplace) is a product of Google LLC. It is an online store for free and paid web applications that work with Google Workspace services and with third party software. Apps are based on Google APIs or on Google Apps Script. Users can now install Google Chat apps from app listing pages.
