= Google Sites =

Structured wiki- and Web page-creation tool

- Screenshot of the editing mode in the New Google Sites.
- Developer: Google
- Release: February 28, 2008; 18 years ago
- Platform: Web
- Type: Website creation Collaborative software
- Website: sites.google.com

Google Sites is a structured wiki and web page creation tool included as part of the free, web-based Google Docs Editors suite offered by Google. The service includes Google Docs, Google Sheets, Google Slides, Google Drawings, Google Forms, and Google Keep. Google Sites is only available on the web.

Since users of Google Sites get a free website with a Google.com domain name, Google Sites has been accused of being an easy way for scammers to set up fake websites that look legitimate.

== History ==
In October 2006, Google acquired JotSpot, founded by Joe Kraus and Graham Spencer, co-founders of Excite.

On February 28, 2008, Google Sites was unveiled using the JotSpot technology. Initially, the service was free, but users needed a domain name. However, on May 21, 2008, Google Sites became available without the need for a domain name.

Websites created using Google Page Creator were migrated to Google Sites by 2009.

In June 2009, all pages hosted on Google Sites were blocked in Turkey after it was alleged that one of the pages hosted on the platform insulted Mustafa Kemal Atatürk. In 2012, the European Court of Human Rights (ECHR) ruled the blockage a breach of Article 10 of the European Convention on Human Rights (Yildirim v Turkey, 2012).

In June 2011, Google Sites introduced a feature to allow users to create webpages designed for mobile phones.

In June 2016, Google introduced a redesigned version of Google Sites that did not use JotSpot technology. Users were required to migrate to the new version of Google Sites in 2021.
