= Chrome Web Store =

Google's online store for its Chrome web browser

- The Chrome Web Store as seen on Chrome
- Launched: December 2010; 15 years ago
- Website: chromewebstore.google.com

Chrome Web Store is Google's online store for its Chrome web browser. As of 2024, Chrome Web Store hosts about 138,000 extensions and 33,000 themes. These extensions are available on Microsoft Edge as well.

== History ==
Chrome Web Store was publicly unveiled in May 2010, and opened on December 7, 2010. A year later it was redesigned to "catalyze a big increase in traffic, across downloads, users, and total number of apps". As of June 2012, there were 750 million total installs of content hosted on Chrome Web Store.

Some extension developers have sold their extensions to third-parties who then incorporated adware. In 2014, Google removed two such extensions from Chrome Web Store after many users complained about unwanted pop-up ads. The following year, Google acknowledged that about five percent of visits to its own websites had been altered by extensions with adware.

== Malware ==
Malware remains a problem on Chrome Web Store. In January 2018, researchers from security firm ICEBRG found four malicious extensions with more than 500,000 combined downloads. In February 2021, Google blocked "The Great Suspender", a popular extension with 2,000,000 users after it was reported that malicious code was added to it.

Chrome used to allow extensions hosted on Chrome Web Store to also be installed at the developer's website for the sake of convenience. However, this became a malware vector, so it was removed in 2018.
