= Google Vids =

Online video editing application

- Developer: Google LLC
- Release: April 9, 2024; 2 years ago
- Platform: Web application
- Type: Collaborative software, web survey, video editing software, special effects, visual effects and mobile app
- Website: vids.google.com

Google Vids (not to be confused with Google Video) is an online timeline-based video editing application included as part of the Google Workspace suite. It is designed to help users create informational videos for work-related purposes. The app uses Google's Gemini technology to enable users to create video storyboards manually or with AI assistance using simple prompts. Features include uploading media, choosing stock videos, images, background music, and a voiceover feature with script generation using AI.

The app is currently in testing with select Google Workspace Labs users. Like Kapwing and Capcut, Google Vids is primarily for creating work-related content like sales training, onboarding videos, vendor outreach, and project updates. It offers various styles and templates, collaborative features, and is not limited to videos without the short integration at the moment.

Google Vids was announced on April 9, 2024. In September 2025, Google began to roll out a basic version of the application to Google Workspace users.
