= Google Chrome App =

Web application that runs on the Google Chrome web browser

Google Chrome Apps
- Available in: English
- Owner: Google
- Creators: Google and other app developers
- Website: chrome.google.com/webstore/category/apps (redirects to Chrome Web Store homepage)
- Commercial: Yes
- Current status: Deprecation

Google Chrome Apps, commonly just Chrome apps, are a deprecated type of non-standardized web application that ran on the Google Chrome web browser from 2010. Chrome apps could be obtained from the Chrome Web Store along with various free and paid extensions and themes. The apps came in two varieties: hosted (server-side) and packaged (client-side), with each format targeting different use cases. Support for Chrome apps in the Chrome Web Store was removed from Chrome in June 2022, except on ChromeOS where support for some Chrome Apps for Enterprise and Education customers has been extended until August 2028. ChromeOS, Linux, and Windows users could add a shortcut of a website as a Chrome app.

Google recommends migrating from Chrome apps to standards-based web applications and Chrome extensions.

== History ==
On August 19, 2016, Google announced that it would begin phasing out Chrome apps for Linux, Windows, and MacOS (both packaged and hosted) by the end of 2016, finishing the process in early 2018. The company said that such apps would continue to be supported and maintained on ChromeOS "for the foreseeable future."

On January 15, 2020, Google announced that Chrome would begin phasing out support for Chrome apps completely starting in March 2020, with support for consumers until June 2021. On October 14, 2021, Google announced that support from Chrome apps for Enterprise and Education customers using ChromeOS would be extended until at least January 2025.

Chrome Apps in Kiosk Mode used by Enterprise and Education customers will be supported until April 2027, and all remaining Chrome Apps used in managed environments by Enterprise and Education organizations will reach their end of life in October 2028.

== Types ==
Chrome apps can be hosted or packaged. Hosted apps have their background web pages on a remote server and the app acts like a bookmark or shortcut; packaged apps have offline functionality making use of local storage.

=== Packaged ===
Packaged apps were launched on September 5, 2013. They have features very similar to a native desktop app, namely offline capable (by default), can interact with hardware devices, and can access local storage. Packaged apps are not confined to the regular Chrome interface and can display without a classic window menu and operating system user interface elements.

=== Hosted ===
Hosted apps are the original type of Chrome apps. They contain a single manifest file that contains the URL and additional information about the app. Hosted apps typically require an internet connection and are subject to regular web page security restrictions.

== See also ==
- Progressive web app
