= Google Account =

User account required for Google-owned services

- Website type: Single sign-on
- Owner: Google
- Website: myaccount.google.com
- IPv6 support: Yes

A Google Account is a user account that is required for access, authentication and authorization to certain online Google services. It is also often used as single sign-on for third party services.

== Usage ==
1. A Google Account is required for Gmail, Google Meet and Blogger. Some Google products do not require an account, including Google Search, YouTube, Google Books, Google Finance and Google Maps. However, an account is needed for uploading videos to YouTube and for making edits in Google Maps.

YouTube and Blogger maintain separate accounts for users who registered with the services before the Google acquisition. However, effective April 2011 YouTube users are required to link to a separate Google Account if they wish to continue to log into that service.

Google Account users may create a publicly accessible Google profile, to configure their presentation on Google products to other Google users. A Google profile can be linked to a user's profiles on various social-networking and image-hosting sites, as well as user blogs.

Third-party service providers may implement service authentication for Google Account holders via the Google Account mechanism.

== Security ==
While creating a Google account, users are asked to provide a recovery email address to allow them to reset their password if they have forgotten it, or if their account is hacked. In some countries, such as the United States, the United Kingdom, India and Italy, Google may also require one-time use of a mobile phone number to send an account validation code by SMS text messaging or voice message when creating a new account.

Google also offers a two-step verification option—for additional security against hacking—that requests a validation code each time the user logs into their Google account. The code is either generated by an application ("Google Authenticator" or other similar apps) or received from Google as an SMS text message, a voice message, or an email to another account. Trusted devices can be "marked" to skip this 2-step log-on authentication. When this feature is switched on, software that cannot provide the validation code (e.g. IMAP and POP3 clients) must use a unique 16-character alphanumeric password generated by Google instead of the user's normal password.

Users who seek an even higher level of security protection, including users whose accounts could be attractive targets for hackers, such as celebrities, politicians, journalists, political activists and wealthy individuals, can opt-in to Google's Advanced Protection Program. This program requires the user to purchase two U2F USB keys — not for data storage, but for identity verification. The U2F keys are used to provide two-step verification during login. One is for backup purposes, in case the first is lost. The Advanced Protection Program includes further security measures to protect the user's account, such as restrictions on which applications the user can grant access to their account, and a more thorough identity verification process for regaining access to the account if the password is forgotten.

On June 5, 2012, a new security feature was introduced to protect users from state-sponsored attacks. Whenever Google analysis indicate that a government has attempted to compromise an account, a notice will be displayed that reads "Warning: We believe state-sponsored attackers may be trying to compromise your account or computer."

== Activity tracking ==
The tool called 'My Activity' launched in 2016 - which supersedes Google Search history and Google Web History — enables users to see and delete data tracked by Google through the Google account. The tool shows which websites were visited using Chrome while logged in, devices used, apps used, Google products interacted with, etc. All information is laid out in a timeline-like layout. Users can choose to entirely disable tracking, or remove certain activities which they do not want to be tracked.

== Account blocking ==
Google may block an account for various reasons, such as "unusual activity" or entering an age "not old enough" to own a Google account. Reactivation is possible using web-forms, providing proof of identity through valid photos ID, or a credit card payment of US$0.30. Other methods (such as sending a fax or uploading some requested document) may require human interaction and may take some "days or a couple of weeks" to be accomplished.

== Account deletion ==
On May 17, 2023, Google announced that, starting in December 2023, it may delete inactive accounts that had not been used or signed into for at least two years. The company clarified to Rolling Stone that inactive accounts with YouTube content will not be deleted after many people feared that YouTube's old music archives, and deceased users whose accounts were popular, could be lost.

== See also ==
- Apple Account
- Facebook Platform: Authentication
- Microsoft account
- OpenID
- WebAuthn
