= Google Calendar =

Time-management and scheduling calendar service

- Logo since May 2026

- Screenshot
- Developer: Google
- Release: Beta - April 13, 2006; 20 years ago; General - July 2009; 17 years ago

Stable release(s) [±]
- Android: 2026.43.1 (Build 1011998630) / November 5, 2026; 12 days ago
- iOS (Note: Including iPadOS and watchOS): 26.43 / November 9, 2026; 8 days ago
- Wear OS: 2026.43 (Build 1011718539) / November 6, 2026; 11 days ago
- Operating system: Android 8+, Wear OS 3+, iOS 18+, (Note: Including iPadOS) watchOS 11+, web Discontinued: iOS 16, 17 (2026); iOS 15 (2024); Android 5, 6, 7, iOS 14 (2023); iOS 12, 13 (2022); iOS 10, 11 (2020); Android Jelly Bean, KitKat (2018); Android Ice Cream Sandwich (2014)
- Type: Electronic calendaring
- License: Freeware
- Website: calendar.google.com
- Repository: github.com/googleworkspace

Logo until 2026

Google Calendar is a time-management and scheduling calendar service developed by Google. It was initially created by Mike Samuel as part of his 20% project at Google, and developed by a team including Mike Samuel, Carl Sjogreen, David Marmaros and Neal Gafter. It became available in beta release April 13, 2006, and in general release in July 2009, on the web and as mobile apps for the Android and iOS platforms.

Google Calendar allows users to create and edit events. Reminders can be enabled for events, with options available for type and time. Event locations can also be added, and other users can be invited to events. Users can enable or disable the visibility of special calendars, including Birthdays, where the app retrieves dates of births from Google contacts and displays birthday cards on a yearly basis, and Holidays, a country-specific calendar that displays dates of special occasions. Over time, Google has added functionality that makes use of machine learning, including "Events from Gmail", where event information from a user's Gmail messages are automatically added to Google Calendar; "Reminders", where users add to-do activities that can be automatically updated with new information; "Smart Suggestions", where the app recommends titles, contacts, and locations when creating events; and "Goals", where users enter information on a specified personal goal, and the app automatically schedules the activity at optimal times.

Google Calendar's mobile apps have received polarized reviews. 2015 reviews of the Android and iOS apps both praised and criticized the design. While some critics praised the design for being "cleaner", "bold" and making use of "colorful graphics", other reviewers asserted that the graphics took up too much space. The Smart Suggestions feature was also liked and disliked, with varying levels of success in the app actually managing to suggest relevant information upon event creation. The integration between Google Calendar and Gmail was praised, however, with critics writing that "all of the relevant details are there".

== Features ==
- Google Calendar allows users to create and edit events. Events have a set start time and stop time, with an option for an "All-day event".
- Users can enable a "Recurring" functionality with optional parameters for frequency.
- Users can add a color to an event for recognition or to distinguish the event from others.
- Events are viewable in different types of setups, including day, week, month, 4 days, or schedule.
- Locations can be added for easy understanding of an event's place.
- Users can optionally set notifications, with options for type (email, mobile push notification) and time.
- Users can invite other people to events; for other Google Calendar users, the event becomes visible in their calendar, and for non-Google Calendar users, an email will have options for "Yes", "No", or "Maybe".
- Privacy settings allow the user to define the levels of public visibility of the entire calendar or individual events. Although the calendar defaults to showing users event times in their local time, users can specify a different time zone for an event.
- Users can enable or disable the visibility of special calendars, including a Birthdays calendar, that automatically retrieves dates of births from a user's Google contacts and displays the dates on a yearly basis, and a Holidays calendar, a country-specific calendar featuring dates of special occasions.
- Users can subscribe to calendars using a URL.

The user interface of Google Calendar was originally designed by Douglas Bowman with some help from Kevin Fox. Google Calendar allows the user to import events from a different calendar application, with notable support for both Microsoft Outlook and Apple iCloud calendars.

=== Updates ===
In December 2010, Google added the ability for users to select a time zone for an event, a notable feature that was previously missing; the feature's absence was criticized in the media.

In August 2015, Google added an "Events from Gmail" feature, where event information from a user's Gmail messages are automatically added to Google Calendar. The feature, enabled by default, will also update events with new information based on new email messages received, such as flight delays.

In December 2015, Google added a "Reminders" feature, enabling users to add to-do activities as Reminders, with those activities being displayed in the calendar alongside regular events. Google also states that Reminders can automatically add additional, helpful information to Reminders based on known details, such as numbers or addresses. Reminders serves as a cross-service feature, meaning Reminders also show up in Inbox by Gmail, Google Now, and Google Keep.

In January 2016, Google added "Smart Suggestions" to Google Calendar on their mobile apps. Smart suggestions will recommend titles of events, as well as locations and contacts. At the same time as Smart Suggestions, Google also added holiday calendars for 54 new countries, adding up to a total of 143 country-specific holiday calendars.

In April 2016, Google added a "Goals" feature. Goals being activities the user wishes to complete. After answering brief questions, including "How often?" and "Best time?", Google Calendar will automatically "find the best windows to pencil in time for that goal", with the calendar adapting to the user's schedule over time, such as rescheduling a goal activity if an event is added that causes a direct conflict with the time of the goal. The feature was expanded in January 2017 with support for Google Fit and Apple Health, to see the progress made towards completing a goal.

In March 2017, the iOS app was updated to feature support for the iPad, and it was again updated in July to add a widget in the iOS "Today" panel.

In June 2017, following May's announcement of Google's new Family Groups feature across several of its services, Google began rolling out "family calendars" for users in Google Calendar. The feature lets family members create shared events visible in a "Family" calendar option.

On September 20, 2022, Google announced that reminders from Google Calendar and Google Assistant will merge with Google Tasks. The migration started in March 2023 with the selection of few users before rolling out to other users as an optional choice in the second quarter of 2023, and concluding on May 22, 2023, to the enterprise sector.

According to Google, in mid-2024 the company started showing only public holidays and national observances as default Calendar events, removing observances like Pride Month and Black History Month. Some users criticized this change in early February 2025 after Google started rolling back its diversity, equity and inclusion (DEI) initiatives.

=== Google Workspace ===
Logo of Google Calendar used from November 21, 2014 to October 5, 2020

For users of Google Workspace (formerly G Suite), a subscription service for business, education and government customers that offers premium functionality, Google Calendar has a "Find a time" feature that can suggest the best time for an event with a group of people, based on available times for each individual in the group. Additionally, the feature can also schedule the meeting room.

== Platforms ==
Google Calendar entered a limited beta release on April 13, 2006, and exited the beta stage in July 2009. Initially only available on the web and on the Android operating system, an iOS app was released on March 10, 2015.

== Reception ==
In a March 2015 review of the Android app, Sarah Mitroff of CNET wrote that the new Material Design-inspired app was "cleaner", with "fewer distractions and colorful graphics that add a lot of personality to an otherwise dull app". She praised the Smart Suggestions feature for making new event creation easy, adding that "Even after just a few letters, the app will suggest the most relevant appointments. This is a great feature for creating events that occur over and over, like a haircut or doctor's appointment, because the app remembers the phrases you use". She complimented the integration between Google Calendar and Gmail, writing that "All of the relevant details are there, including confirmation numbers, links to the source email, even gate assignments for flights", and called it "one of my favorite parts of the app", but also noted that the feature could be turned off. Furthermore, she praised "the personal design touches that keep it from looking dull", namely the app offering visual illustrations for certain types of events, like a bucket of popcorn for movie events, or a visual map of the event location, as well as themed illustrations for different months, including "a snow-covered mountain and a skier" for December. Overall, she wrote that Google Calendar "is a reliable, simple and playful alternative to your device's built-in calendar" and that it is "efficient and a breeze to use".

In contrast, Allyson Kazmucha of iMore criticized several aspects of the iPhone app. She wrote that "The first thing you notice about Google Calendar is the bold interface", adding that "Google automatically detects certain event types and puts graphics behind them, which is a nice touch". However, she criticized the amount of space the graphics take up, writing that "it wastes a lot of space that could be used to show more events at a glance. It's not a huge peeve, but for anyone who has a busy calendar, it could result in a lot of scrolling". She also criticized the Smart Suggestions, writing that "in my short time using Google Calendar, the natural language support leaves a lot to be desired. I had trouble typing times or days and getting Google to understand it". She did, however, like the view options available, writing that "The three day view is one of my favorites", but also noted that there was a lack of "the ability to quickly drag events around to reschedule them". Kazmucha also criticized the then-lack of a widget in the Notification Center, but wrote conclusively that "Google Calendar is off to a good start but it isn't making me switch away from [current calendar app]."

Derek Walter of Macworld, however, praised the iPhone app, writing that "It's a gorgeous calendar app that mines your Gmail account to automatically add events", with "a splash of color and graphics for effect". Walter also criticized the then-lack of a widget in the Notification Center, as well as the then-lack of iPad support. Walter called the Material Design "rather elegant and polished, with a focus on parceling off information for easy viewing, registering touches with a subtle splash on the screen, and using a lot of visuals cues", but noted that "it's not for everyone, especially if you prefer Apple's design overhaul first introduced in iOS 7. You'll also find that some elements of Material Design don't translate well to the iPhone, such as the loss of the slide gesture to go back".

== See also ==
- List of personal information managers
