= Google Slides =

Cloud-based presentation software

- An example of a Google Slides presentation
- Developer: Google LLC
- Release: March 9, 2006; 20 years ago

Stable release(s)
- Android: 1.26.463.1 / November 11, 2026; 9 days ago
- iOS (Note: Including iPadOS): 1.2026.47103 / November 19, 2026; 1 day ago
- Google Chrome: 1.112.1 / November 17, 2026; 3 days ago
- Written in: JavaScript
- Operating system: Android 8+; iOS 17+; ChromeOS; Discontinued: iOS 16 (2026); iOS 15 (2024); Android 7, iOS 14 (2023); iOS 13 (2022); Android 6, iOS 12 (2021); iOS 11 (2020); Android 5 (2019); Android KitKat (2018); Android Jelly Bean (2017); Android Ice Cream Sandwich (2015)
- Platform: Web application
- Available in: 83 languages
- Type: Collaborative software; Presentation program
- Website: google.com/slides
- Repository: github.com/googleworkspace

Google Slides is a presentation program and part of the free, web-based Google Docs suite offered by Google. Google Slides is available as a web application, mobile app for: Android, iOS, and as a desktop application on Google's ChromeOS. The app is compatible with Microsoft PowerPoint file formats. The app allows users to create and edit files online while collaborating with other users in real-time. Edits are tracked by a user with a revision history presenting changes. An editor's position is highlighted with an editor-specific color and cursor and a permissions system regulates what users can do. Updates have introduced features using machine learning, including "Explore," offering and "tasks to other users."

== History ==
In September 2007, Google released a presentation program for the Google Docs suite, which originated from the company's acquisition of Zenter on June 19, 2007 and Tonic Systems on April 17, 2007. In March 2010, Google acquired DocVerse, an online document collaboration company that allowed online collaboration between multiple users on Microsoft PowerPoint and other Microsoft Office-compatible document formats such as Microsoft Word and Microsoft Excel. Improvements based on DocVerse were announced and deployed in April 2010. In June 2012, Google acquired Quickoffice, a freeware proprietary productivity suite for mobile devices. In October 2012, Google renamed Google Presentations to Google Slides and a Google Chrome app was released, which provided shortcuts to Slides on Chrome's new tab page.

== Platforms ==
Google Slides is available as a web application supported on the Google Chrome, Firefox, Microsoft Edge, and Safari web browsers. Users can access presentations, as well as other files, through the Google Drive website. In June 2014, Google rolled out a dedicated homepage for Slides that contained only files created using the Drive suite. In 2014, Google launched a dedicated mobile app for Slides for the Android and iOS mobile operating systems. In 2015, the mobile website for Slides was updated with a "simpler, more uniform" interface and while users can read files through the mobile websites, users trying to edit presentations will be redirected towards the dedicated mobile app for Slides, thus preventing editing on the mobile web.

== Features ==
=== Editing ===
==== Collaboration and revision history ====
Google Slides serves as a collaborative tool for cooperative editing of presentations in real time. Presentations can be shared, opened, and edited by multiple users simultaneously and users can see slide-by-slide and character-by-character changes as other collaborators make edits. Changes are automatically saved to Google's servers and a revision history is automatically kept with the option of reverting to previous versions.

An editor's current position is represented with an editor-specific color/cursor, so if another editor happens to be viewing the same slide, they can see edits as they occur. A sidebar chat functionality allows collaborators to discuss edits. The revision history allows users to see the additions made to a document, with each author distinguished by color. Only adjacent revisions can be compared and users cannot control how frequently revisions are saved. Files can be exported to a user's local computer in a variety of formats, including HTML, .jpg, and PDF.

==== Explore ====
Launched in September 2016, "Explore" provides additional functionality to the Google Drive suite through machine learning. In Google Slides, Explore dynamically generates design suggestions based on the contents of each slide. The "Explore" features in the Drive suite follow the launch of a more basic research tool originally introduced in 2012.

==== Action items ====
In October 2016, Google announced the addition of "action items" to Slides. If a user writes the name of a person the presentation is shared within a comment, the service will intelligently assign that action to the person. Google states this will make it easier for other collaborators to see who is responsible for individual tasks. When a user visits Google Sheets or any of the other Google Drive applications, any files with tasks assigned to them will be highlighted with a badge.

==== Offline editing ====
To view and edit presentations offline, users need to be using the Google Chrome web browser. A Chrome extension, Google Docs Offline, allows users to enable offline support for Slides files on the Google Drive website. The Android and iOS apps natively support offline editing.

=== Files ===
==== Supported file formats and limits ====
.GSLIDES	Google Slides Shortcut
.JPG	JPEG Image
.ODP	OpenDocument Presentation
.PDF	Portable Document Format File
.PNG	Portable Network Graphic
.POT	Microsoft PowerPoint Template (Legacy)
.POTM	Microsoft PowerPoint Macro-Enabled Presentation Template
.POTX	Microsoft PowerPoint Presentation Template
.PPS	Microsoft PowerPoint Slide Show (Legacy)
.PPSM	Microsoft PowerPoint Macro-Enabled Show
.PPSX	Microsoft PowerPoint Slide Show
.PPT	Microsoft PowerPoint Presentation (Legacy)
.PPTX	Microsoft PowerPoint Presentation
.PPTM	Microsoft PowerPoint Macro-Enabled Presentation
.SVG	Scalable Vector Graphics File
.TXT	Plain Text File

Google Slides presentation files converted to the .gslides format cannot be larger than 100 MB. Images inserted cannot be larger than 50 MB and must be in either .jpg, .png, or .gif formats. Google Slides notably does not support .webp images, even though the file format works on most other Google services and it was developed by the company itself.

==== Google Workspace ====
Google Slides is free to use for individuals, but it is also available as part of the business-centered Google Workspace (formerly G Suite) service by Google, which is a monthly subscription that enables additional business-focused functionality.

=== Other features ===
A simple find and replace tool is available and like all Google Drive suite programs, Slides includes a web clipboard tool that allows users to copy and paste content between Slides and the other Drive apps. The web clipboard can also be used for copying and pasting content between different computers, although the Google Docs Offline extension would need to be installed. Copied items are stored on Google's servers for up to 30 days. Google Slides also supports keyboard shortcuts for copying and pasting in most circumstances.

Google offers an extension for the Google Chrome web browser called Office editing for Docs, Sheets and Slides that enables users to view and edit PowerPoint documents and other Microsoft Office documents on Google Chrome, via the Google Drive suite apps. The extension can be used for opening Office files stored on computers using Chrome, as well as for opening Office files encountered on the web (in the form of email attachments, web search results, etc.) without having to download them. The extension is installed on ChromeOS by default.

=== Discontinued features ===
Google Cloud Connect was a plug-in for Microsoft Office 2003, 2007, and 2010 that could automatically store and synchronize any PowerPoint presentation to Google Docs (before the introduction of Drive) in the Google Slides or PowerPoint formats. The online copy was automatically updated each time the PowerPoint document was saved. PowerPoint documents could be edited offline and synchronized later when online. Google Cloud Connect maintained previous document versions and allowed multiple users to collaborate by working on the same document at the same time. Google Cloud Connect has been discontinued as of April 30, 2013, as, according to Google, Google Drive achieves all of the above tasks, "with better results".
