= Irritant Horn =

Irritant Horn was a surveillance operation plan with the goal of compromising smartphones through usage of Google and Samsung application stores. The operation was developed by the US National Security Agency in alliance with agencies from Britain, Canada, New Zealand and Australia. The operation was revealed by documents leaked by Edward Snowden.
