= Pixel Buds =

Line of earbuds developed by Google

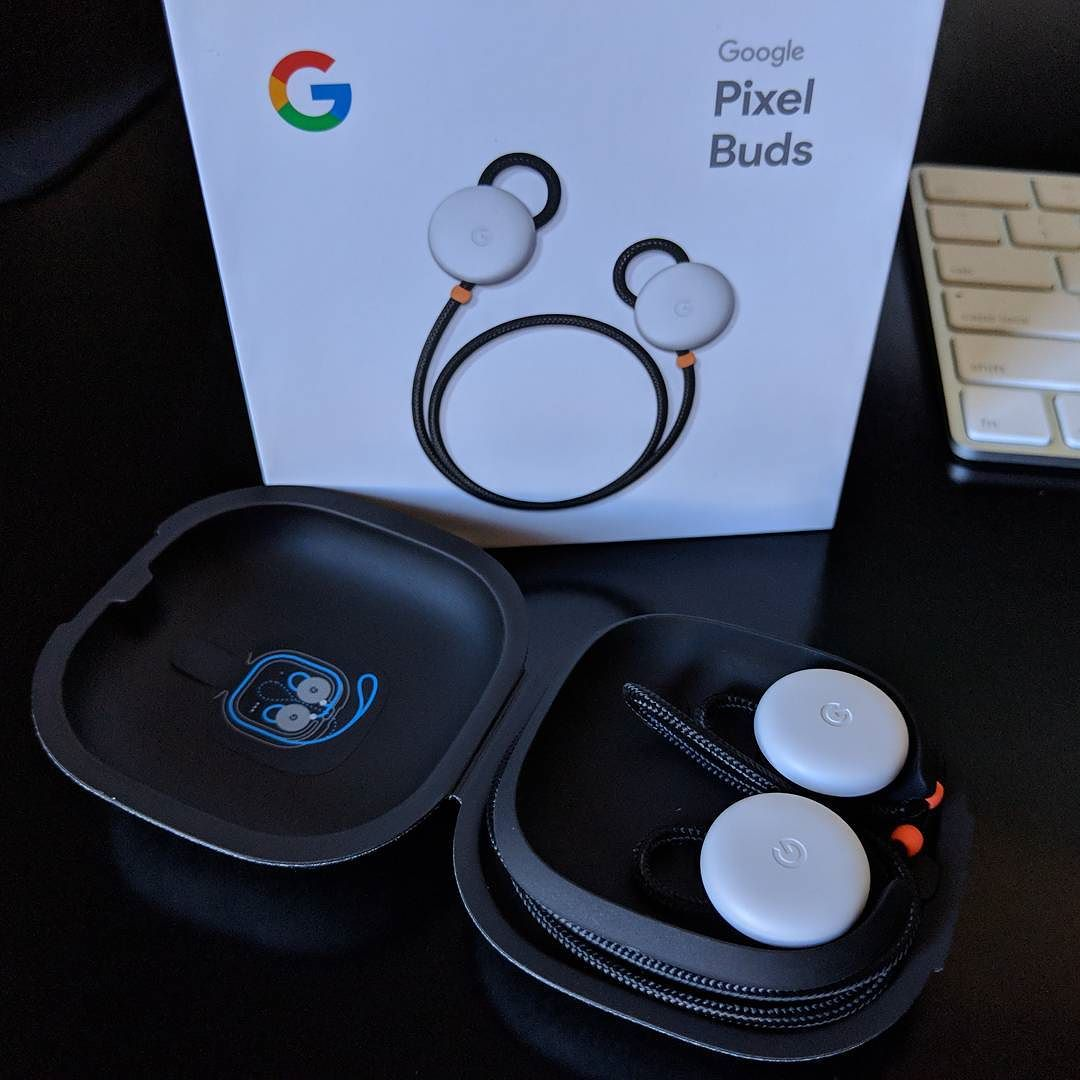
- First-generation Pixel Buds
- Developer: Google
- Manufacturer: Goertek (first-generation)
- Product family: Pixel
- Type: Wireless earbuds
- Released: First-generation: November 2017: Canada; United States; February 2018: Australia; Germany; United Kingdom; Second-generation: April 2020: United States; July 2020: Australia; Canada; France; Germany; Ireland; Italy; Singapore; Spain; United Kingdom; Pixel Buds A-Series: June 2021: Canada; United States; August 2021: France; Germany; Ireland; India; Italy; Spain; United Kingdom; Pixel Buds Pro: July 2022: Australia; Canada; France; Germany; Ireland; Italy; Japan; Singapore; Spain; Taiwan; United Kingdom; United States; Pixel Buds Pro 2: September 2024: Australia; Canada; France; Germany; Ireland; Italy; Japan; Singapore; Spain; Taiwan; United Kingdom; United States
- Input: Microphone, accelerometer, capacitive touchpad
- Connectivity: Earbuds: Bluetooth; Charging Case: USB-C
- Current firmware: 553 (February 2021)
- Dimensions: Earbuds; 0.8 x 0.8 x 0.8 in; (20.4 x 20.4 x 20.5 mm); Charging Case; 2.6 x 2.6 x 1.1 in; (66.2 x 65.5 x 28.6 mm)
- Weight: Earbuds; 0.49 ounces (14 g); Charging Case; 1.5 ounces (43 g)
- Website: Google Store

The Pixel Buds is a line of wireless earbuds developed and marketed by Google. The first-generation Pixel Buds were launched on October 4, 2017, at the Made by Google launch event, and became available for preorder on the Google Store the same day. They integrate with the Google Assistant and support real-time translation with Google Translate.

The second-generation Pixel Buds (sometimes known as Pixel Buds 2 or Pixel Buds 2020 to distinguish them from the first-generation earbuds) were announced at the Pixel 4 hardware event on October 15, 2019. They were released on April 27, 2020 and debuted to positive reviews.

In June 2021, Google announced the Pixel Buds A-Series, a mid-range variant of the second-generation Pixel Buds. In May 2022, Google announced the Pixel Buds Pro, a premium variant of the Pixel Buds with additional features including active noise cancellation. In August 2024, Google announced the Pixel Buds Pro 2 with Gemini and with improved active noise cancellation.

== Models ==
=== First generation ===
The Pixel Buds were announced at Google's annual hardware event on October 4, 2017, alongside its second-generation Pixel 2 smartphone. Color choices for the Pixel Buds complemented the Pixel 2, and carried the same names: Just Black, Clearly White, and Kinda Blue, referring to the color of the circular plastic cap visible in the ear. After the second-generation Pixel Buds were announced in October 2019, Google removed the first-generation from its store.

==== Physical design ====
The industrial design team was led by Gina Reimann.

The first-generation Pixel Buds consist of two earbuds linked by a fabric-covered cord, which connect wirelessly over a Bluetooth 4.2 connection. The earbuds are an "open-air" design, where the driver rests just outside the user's ear canal, and there is relatively little isolation from outside sounds. Each earbud is secured physically into the user's concha by a short loop of the cord; the length of the loop is individually adjustable to better fit each user. The earbuds are powered by a 120 mA-hr battery stored in the left earbud, and provide five hours of listening time before needing to be recharged.

The earbuds are stored in a fabric-covered case with an internal battery and USB-C connection; the storage case charges the earbuds, and the USB-C port charges the battery of the storage case. Once the earbuds have been placed in the appropriate sockets, the cord connecting them is wound and stored in a specific manner, illustrated on the inside of the upper lid, to allow the case to close. The case also has a button to pair the earbuds manually and LED indicators to communicate the state of charge and pairing readiness. The battery in the charging case has a 2.39 W-hr capacity, providing enough energy for 24 hours of earbud operation.

Pixel Buds (Gen 1) color schemes
| Name | Cap | Accent |
|---|---|---|
| Just Black | Black | White |
| Clearly White | White | Coral |
| Kinda Blue | Blue | Seafoam |

==== Features ====
The distinguishing feature of Pixel Buds is their integration with the Google Assistant, a smart voice assistant. This allows the earbuds to translate conversations in real-time, among other standard features such as web search and media connectivity. It supports translation of 40 different languages. Based on the October 2017 demonstration, early coverage compared the Pixel Buds' translation capabilities to that of the fictional Babel fish from The Hitchhiker's Guide to the Galaxy by Douglas Adams; however, in a review for Wired, James Temperton called the feature as released "a bit of a con", as the Pixel Buds merely provided a microphone and speaker for transcription and machine translation powered by Google Translate running on a smartphone: "to speak English to a German who then replies in German that's translated into English you will need: two Google Pixel 2 phones and two Google Pixel Buds headsets. And even then you'll likely spend most of the conversation staring awkwardly into middle-distance while Assistant tries to work out what the hell is going on. Long rant cut short: you don't actually need the Pixel Buds to do this, they're an entirely pointless accessory."

The surface of the right earbud is touch-sensitive: a tap will play or pause audio, swiping forward or backward will raise or lower the volume, respectively, and tapping and holding will bring up the Google Assistant prompt. Double-tapping will read a notification aloud. Triple-Tapping will connect/disconnect the Pixel Buds from their source. The Pixel Buds do not have ear-sensing features, so audio playback does not automatically pause and the touch-sensitive surface remains active after the earbuds are removed; the surface is deactivated once the earbuds are seated properly in the charging case.

The Pixel Buds also introduced a "fast pair" feature to Android; with a smartphone that runs Android 6.0 (Marshmallow) or higher with the Bluetooth radio active, opening the lid of the case will bring up a notification prompting the user to pair the earbuds with the phone. The button of the case also can be used to pair the Pixel Buds manually as needed.

==== Reception ====
Reception of the Pixel Buds was mostly negative, with much of the criticism aimed towards its storage case and the awkward steps required to seat the earbuds and wind the cord properly. Google's support page tells the user to "press down to make sure the charging pins are firmly in place", despite the presence of magnets to help align and retain the Pixel Buds in their storage case.

In 2018, Google announced "Google Translate is available on all Assistant-optimized headphones and Android phones." By opening the service to more devices, researcher Matic Horvat hypothesized that Google was seeking more inputs to train its neural network for real-time, natural-language speech recognition.

=== Second generation ===
Pixel Buds (Gen 2) colors
| Name | Cap |
|---|---|
| Clearly White | White |
| Oh So Orange | Orange |
| Quite Mint | Green |
| Almost Black | Black |

The second-generation Pixel Buds 2 were first announced at a Google hardware event on October 15, 2019 and released in the United States in April 2020. They were released in Australia, Canada, France, Germany, Ireland, Italy, Singapore, Spain, and the United Kingdom in July 2020. Initially, only the Clearly White color was available; the other three colors (Oh So Orange, Quite Mint (green), and Almost Black) were released four months later in the United States on August 20, 2020. Google quietly discontinued the orange color in April 2021, and all second-generation Pixel Buds were discontinued in favor of the Pixel Buds A-Series shortly after the latter were announced in June 2021.

==== Design & features ====
The design of the second-generation Pixel Buds was led by Luke Mastrangelo. For Google, Isabelle Olsson, Kenny Sweet, and Gina Reimann led the product design team.

Unlike the first-generation Pixel Buds, which had the earbud modules linked by a fabric-covered cable, the second-generation were implemented as two separate earbud modules. Each earbud has a small wing that rests against the concha to secure it in place instead of the short cord loop. In addition, each earbud has a soft rubber tip designed to slide into the user's ear canal, providing some passive noise cancellation; three pairs of tips in different sizes to customize the fit are bundled with the second-generation Pixel Buds. The colored circular dome that protrudes slightly from the ear uses the same touch and gesture controls from the first-generation Pixel Buds, with double-tap (skip track) and triple-tap (go back one track) inputs added. In addition, for the second-generation, both earbuds are touch-sensitive.

The second-generation Pixel Buds also featured hands-free Google Assistant activation; instead of having to tap and hold, users could use the voice prompt "Hey Google" to bring up the Assistant.

The storage case, which also charged the earbuds, measures 63 mm × 47 mm × 25 mm (2.48 in × 1.85 in × 0.98 in) and is comparable in size and design to the storage/charging case that Apple supplies with its AirPods. Its shape and size were inspired by a weathered rock taken from Asilomar State Beach. The sockets are equipped with magnets to secure each earbud and align it with the charging pins. Compared to the first-generation Pixel Buds storage case, the second-generation added wireless charging and retained the USB-C charging port for its internal battery.

==== Reception ====
Reports of audio dropouts and intermittent connectivity began circulating soon after the second-generation Pixel Buds were delivered to customers, occurring most notably outdoors or when the user turned their head. Multiple firmware updates were issued to address connectivity issues, but some users reported having to turn off features to retain basic functionality. Google later explained the second-generation Pixel Buds connect in series: the right earbud connects to the phone, and the left earbud connects to the right, which serves to relay signals to and from the left earbud; the issue later was attributed to interference over the Bluetooth connection. Because the serial connection scheme was part of the basic design, the connection issues could not be fixed in firmware.

=== Pixel Buds A-Series ===
Pixel Buds (A) colors
| Name | Cap |
|---|---|
| Clearly White | White |
| Dark Olive | Green |
| Charcoal | Gray |
| Sea | Light blue |

On June 3, 2021, Google announced the Pixel Buds A-Series, a mid-range variant of the second-generation Pixel Buds that largely share the same external design. They were released on June 17, 2021 in the United States and Canada. In August, they were further released in France, Germany, India, Ireland, Italy, Spain, and the United Kingdom. As released in June 2021, the A-Series was available initially in Clearly White and Dark Olive (green) colors; in October 2022, a Charcoal (dark grey) color was added; in May 2023, a Sea (light blue) color was added.

==== Design & features ====
Industrial design of the Pixel Buds A-Series again was led by Gina Reimann for Google, heading a team that included Dustin Lee and Jeremiah Baker.

The Pixel Buds A-Series share the design of the second-generation Pixel Buds, made up of three components: two independent earbud modules stored in a flip-top charging case. The A-Series earbuds also share the rubber "stabilizer arc" design to secure the earbud into the user's concha; Google stated they had softened the rubber in the A-Series to enhance user comfort. In addition, the A-Series retained the enhanced touch controls from the second-generation Pixel Buds, with one exception: the swipe volume control gestures were removed. To address the connectivity issues of the second-generation Pixel Buds, the A-Series earbuds each connect to the device independently rather than using a serial/relay connection scheme. Externally, the second-generation Pixel Buds use three charging pins and have a metal output nozzle, while the A-Series have two pins and a plastic nozzle.

The A-series case is the same size as the second-generation Pixel Buds case and likewise is equipped with magnets to hold the earbuds in place and secure the lid; it also has a USB-C connection to charge the case battery. However, unlike the second-generation Pixel Buds case, the A-Series charging case did not have wireless charging capability. Physically, the interior of the A-Series charging case is finished in glossy plastic matching the color of the earbuds; the second-generation Pixel Buds charging case interior is always black with a pebbled finish. In addition, the second-generation Pixel Buds charging case has two LED indicators, one inside the lid (for the charging status of the earbuds) and one external (for the charging and pairing statuses of the case); the A-Series charging case has only the one external indicator that combines both functions.

=== Pixel Buds Pro ===
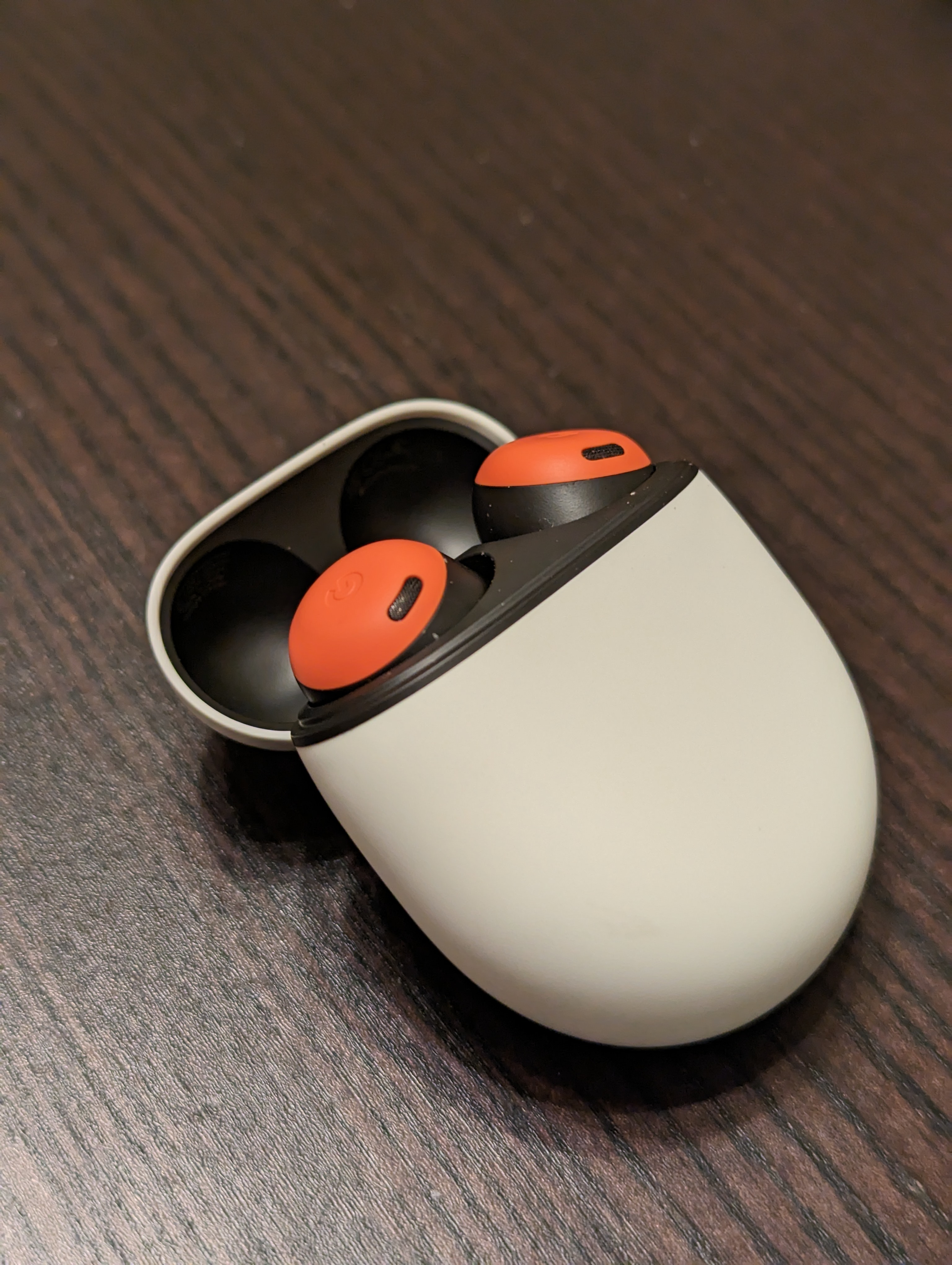
Pixel Buds Pro (coral) in case

On May 11, 2022, Google announced the Pixel Buds Pro, a premium variant of the Pixel Buds, during the 2022 Google I/O keynote. They were released on July 28, 2022, in Australia, Canada, France, Germany, Ireland, Italy, Japan, Singapore, Spain, Taiwan, the United Kingdom, and the United States. They were available initially in four colors: Charcoal (dark grey), Coral (orange-red), Fog (light blue), and Lemongrass (light yellow-green). With the launch of the Pixel 8 in October 2023, Google introduced two additional colors: Bay (pastel blue) and Porcelain (light gray).

==== Design & features ====
Pixel Buds Pro was the first generation to introduce Active Noise Cancellation (ANC) and transparency modes; in ANC mode, the Pixel Buds Pro will reduce background noise, while in transparency mode, the Pro will amplify external noises to facilitate conversations without removing the earbuds. The touch-and-hold gesture can be set independently for the left and right earbuds; by default, one is set to activate the Google Assistant while the other is set to toggle between ANC and transparency modes. Physically, the earbuds have removed the "stabilizer arc" that is used on both the second-generation and A-Series Pixel Buds; the Pro earbuds sit deeper in the wearer's cavum to overcome the Pro's increased size resulting from the larger battery and acoustic elements required for ANC. Each earbud has a silicone tip designed to slide into the user's ear canal, providing some passive noise cancellation.

Pixel Buds Pro colors
| Name | Cap |
|---|---|
| Coral | Orange |
| Fog | Light Blue |
| Charcoal | Dark Gray |
| Lemongrass | Yellow-Green |
| Bay | Blue |
| Porcelain | Light Gray |

The charging case is largely similar to the prior second-generation and A-Series cases, but the Pro case is slightly larger to accommodate the larger earbuds and measures 63.2 mm × 50 mm × 25 mm (2.49 in × 1.97 in × 0.98 in).

Firmware updates after its initial release have added several features to the Pixel Buds Pro, including a five-band equalizer (Oct 2022) and a scheduled update for spatial audio with head tracking (Jan 2023). Conversation detection and further noise reduction features were added in October 2023.

==== Reception ====
Pixel Buds Pro received positive reviews from major tech review sources, being lauded for its comfort, improved antenna performance, and premium feel.

=== Pixel Buds Pro 2 ===
On August 13, 2024, Google announced the Pixel Buds Pro 2, an updated version of the Pixel Buds Pro, during the Made by Google '24 event. They released on September 26, available initially in four colors: Porcelain (off-white), Hazel (gray-green), Wintergreen (light green), and Peony (pink).

In 2025, the Wintergreen color was replaced by Moonstone (gray-blue) to match the new color found in the Pixel 10 Pro, Pixel 10 Pro XL, Pixel 10 Pro Fold, and Pixel Watch 4 (45mm). Similarly, in 2026, the Wintergreen color was replaced by Olive (dark green) matching the Pixel 11 lineup.

==== Design & features ====
Pixel Buds Pro 2 colors
| | Name | Cap |
Base colors
| Base colors | Porcelain | Off-white |
| Base colors | Hazel | Gray-green |
| Base colors | Peony | Pink |
| 2024 lineup color | Wintergreen | Light green |
| 2025 lineup color | Moonstone | Gray-Blue |
| 2026 lineup color | Olive | Olive |

The Pixel Buds Pro 2 also offer ANC and transparency modes with conversation detection, which detects when the user is speaking and pauses playback; compared to the first-generation Pixel Buds Pro, the Pro 2 includes the "Tensor A1" chipset and 11 mm drivers, resulting in earbuds that are 27% smaller and offer up to eight hours of listening with ANC.

Similar to the first-generation Pixel Buds Pro, the earbuds drop the "stabilizer arc" found on both the second-generation and A-Series Pixel Buds, changing it to a "twist-to-adjust" stabilizer fin that sits evenly to the earbud rather than sticking out the top. Twisting the earbud into your ear allows for a tighter fit for intensive activities like working out, while not twisting allows for a looser more comfortable fit.

In the "September 2025 Pixel Drop", Google announced they were bringing a head-gesture feature to the earbuds, which allows you to nod your head to answer calls, or voice-dictate replies to messages, as well as shake your head to decline calls. This feature, which is found in other earbuds such as Apple's Airpods Pro 2, uses an accelerometer and other sensors in each earbud to detect when you move your head. In addition, Google also announced an Adaptive Audio feature, which "dynamically decreases the level of noise in loud environments... while still keeping you aware of your surroundings", and Loud Noise Protection that lowers the volume of loud, harsh sounds.

=== Pixel Buds 2a ===
On August 20, 2025, at the Made By Google '25 event, Google announced a successor to the Pixel Buds A-series, simplifying the name to Pixel Buds 2a. It was released on October 9th, the same day as the Pixel Watch 4, and Pixel 10 Pro Fold.

It was initially available in two colors: Iris (light purple), and Hazel (dark grey). Later on February 18, 2026, alongside the announcement of the Pixel 10a, Google added two more colors that match the phone's color variants: Fog (light green) and Berry (pink-red)

==== Design & features ====
Pixel Buds 2a colors
| Name | Cap |
|---|---|
| Iris | Light purple |
| Hazel | Dark grey |
| Fog | Light green |
| Berry | Pink-red |

For a modest price increase, the earbuds added ANC and Transparency Mode, both powered by the same Google Tensor A1 chipset found in Pixel Buds Pro 2. It also came with a larger 11mm dynamic speaker driver, Bluetooth 5.4 and Super Wideband, and a longer total listening time of ten hours for both earbuds (7 hours with ANC enabled), and twenty-seven when combined with the case (20 with ANC enabled).

The earbuds also carry over the new wing-tip design from the Pixel Buds Pro 2, along with the "twist-to-adjust" mechanism that adjusts how firmly they sit in your ear.

== See also ==
- Amazon Echo Buds
- Apple AirPods
- Microsoft Surface Earbuds
- Samsung Galaxy Buds series
