= Shoploop =

Social shopping site with video

- Developer: Area 120 (Google)
- Platform: iOS; Android
- Website: shoploop.app

Shoploop was a new generation video shopping platform developed by Area 120 at Google, that enabled products to be promoted within a maximum of 90 seconds.
