= Reply (Google) =

App by Area 120, Google's experimental workshop

- Developer: Area 120 (Google)
- Initial release: February 2018
- Operating system: Android
- Type: Instant messaging / Automation
- License: Proprietary

Reply was an app by Area 120, Google's experimental workshop, released to closed beta testing in February 2018, and shortly after reported as leaked. The app allowed users to insert pre-defined replies called "Smart Replies" into conversations on messaging apps on their phone such as Facebook Messenger, Slack and Google Hangouts. The beta testing was cancelled in October, 2018.

Reply suggested various responses to questions or statements based on statements by the user's conversation partner. The suggested replies varied according to the type of incoming message (detected by the tone, contents of the message, and the user's context, which may trigger "Vacation responder" or "Urgent" types of automatic replies). Additionally, based on the phone accelerometer, Reply was able to determine whether the user was in a vehicle or biking and could auto-respond appropriately. It could also reply appropriately when the user was sleeping. The user can see the suggested responses in their notifications and decide if they want to send one of them from the notification without having to open the app in which the response is sent.
