= Amazon Echo Buds =

Wireless headphones

- Developer: Amazon
- Product family: Echo
- Type: Wireless earbuds
- Released: October 30, 2019
- Input: Echo Buds (each); Dual external beam-forming microphones, single internal microphone, accelerometer, proximity, touch
- Connectivity: Echo Buds (each); Bluetooth; Charging Case micro-USB port
- Dimensions: Echo Buds (each); 22 x 23 x 24 mm Charging Case; 57 x 77 x 29 mm
- Weight: Echo Buds (each); 7.6 g (7.8 g with medium ear tip); Charging Case; 70 g

Amazon Echo Buds are wireless earbuds made by Amazon as part of the Amazon Echo family.

== See also ==
- AirPods
- Pixel Buds
- Microsoft Surface Earbuds
- Samsung Galaxy Buds series
