= Google App Maker =

Application development tool

- Developer: Google, Inc
- Release: November 30, 2016; 9 years ago
- Type: App development
- Website: appmaker.google.com

Google App Maker was a low-code application development tool, developed by Google Inc. as part of the G Suite family. It allowed developers or its users to build and deploy custom business apps on the web.

Launched in 2016, it was accessible to its users with any G Suite Business and Enterprise subscription and G Suite for Education edition.

Google App Maker allowed users to drag and drop widgets into a visual editor with built-in templates. The apps could be customized using HTML, CSS, JavaScript, JQuery and Google's own material design visual framework.

PC Magazine rated Google App Maker 3.5/5.

Following Google's acquisition of AppSheet, the App Maker editor and user apps was shut down on January 19, 2021. New app creation was disabled on April 15, 2020.

== See also ==
- Google Workspace
- Google App Script
- List of Google products
