= Pixel Watch 2 =

2023 smartwatch developed by Google

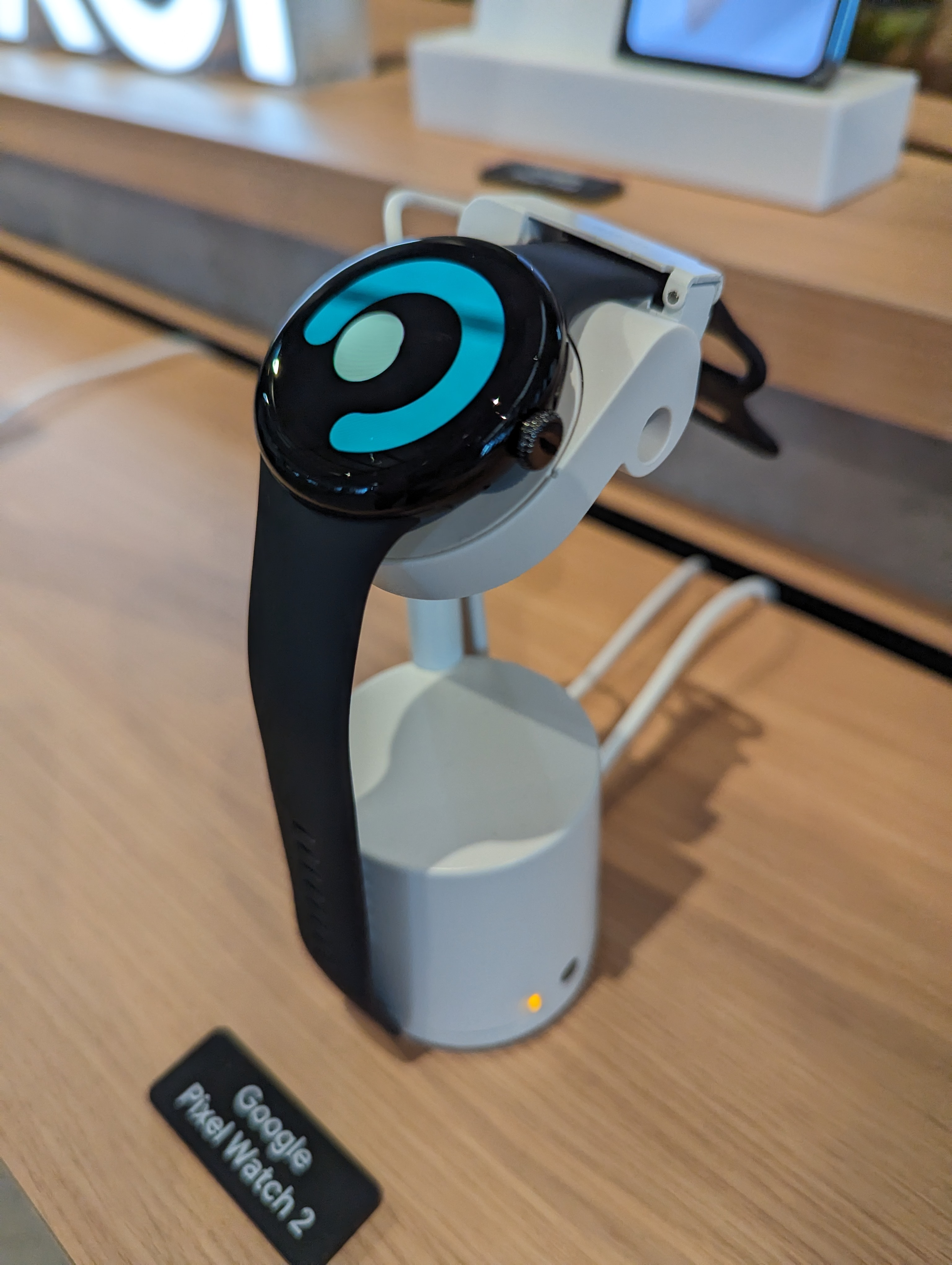
- A Pixel Watch 2 on display at a store in Shibuya Stream in Tokyo, Japan
- Brand: Google
- Type: Smartwatch
- Series: Pixel
- First released: October 12, 2023; 3 years ago
- Availability by region: 21 countries
- Predecessor: Pixel Watch
- Successor: Pixel Watch 3
- Compatible networks: LTE; UMTS
- Dimensions: D: 41 mm (1.6 in); H: 12.3 mm (0.48 in)
- Weight: 31 g (1.1 oz)
- Operating system: Wear OS 4.0 Upgradable to Wear OS 7.0
- System-on-chip: Qualcomm Snapdragon SW5100; ARM Cortex-M33
- GPU: Qualcomm Adreno 702
- Memory: 2 GB SDRAM
- Storage: 32 GB eMMC flash
- Battery: 306 mAh (lithium-ion)
- Display: AMOLED at 320 ppi with DCI-P3 color, 450x450 pixels
- Sound: Speaker; Microphone
- Connectivity: Wi-Fi 802.11 b/g/n; Bluetooth 5.0; NFC; GPS / GLONASS / BeiDou / Galileo; USB-C
- Data inputs: Accelerometer; Altimeter; Ambient light sensor; Barometer; Compass; Electrical sensor; Gyroscope; Magnetometer; Multipath optical heart rate sensor; Multipurpose electrical sensors; Red and infrared sensors; Skin temperature sensor
- Water resistance: 5 ATM
- Codename: Eos; Aurora
- Other: Custom 3D Gorilla Glass 5

The Pixel Watch 2 is a Wear OS-based smartwatch designed, developed, and marketed by Google as part of the Google Pixel product line. It serves as the successor to the first-generation Pixel Watch.

The Pixel Watch 2 was officially announced on October 4, 2023, at the annual Made by Google event, and was released in the United States on October 12.

== History ==
In May 2023, 9to5Google reported that Google intended to release a successor to the Pixel Watch, a Wear OS–powered smartwatch, in October. Two codenames for the watch, believed to be in reference to the Wi-Fi and cellular models, were later discovered to be "Eos" and "Aurora". Three models were approved by the Federal Communications Commission (FCC) in August, while the Eos model was listed on the Google Play Console device catalog for developers. After previewing the watch in September, Google officially announced the Pixel Watch 2 on October 4, alongside the Pixel 8 and Pixel 8 Pro, at the annual Made by Google event. Pre-orders became available the same day, before being released in 30 countries on October 12. The watch suffered from significant shipping delays at the online Google Store.

== Specifications ==
=== Design ===
Visually, the Pixel Watch 2 is near-identical to its predecessor, save a "slightly redesigned haptic crown". Six new families of watch faces were made available at launch. It is available in four case–band color pairs:

Color options for the Pixel Watch
Case	Polished Silver	Matte Black	Champagne Gold	Polished Silver
Active Band	Bay	Obsidian	Hazel	Porcelain

=== Hardware ===
The Pixel Watch 2 is made of recycled aluminum, a departure from the original Pixel Watch's stainless steel watch frame. Google stated that the change was made to make the watch lighter and more comfortable for users. It is powered by Qualcomm's Snapdragon SW5100 system-on-chip (SoC), a departure from its predecessor's Samsung Exynos chip. The watch's new circular sensor array consists of several new sensors. A multipath heart rate sensor boasts more accurate readings; a skin temperature sensor tracks sleep but not menstruation; while an electrodermal activity sensor detects sweat beads to assess the wearer's mood. The Pixel Watch 2 is not compatible with the first generation's proprietary magnetic charger, instead requiring a newer and faster one.

=== Software ===
The Pixel Watch 2 shipped with Wear OS 4.0. Like its predecessor, the watch features heavy Fitbit integration, given Google's acquisition of the company in 2021. New personal safety features include emergency location sharing, Safety Check, and Safety Signal.

== Reception ==
In her review for The Verge, Victoria Song praised the Pixel Watch 2's improvements from the first-generation on all fronts, especially battery life, as did Yahoo! Finance reviewer Daniel Howley and Digital Spy reviewer Jason Murdock. Julian Chokkattu of Wired concurred, writing, "I get a watch that actually comes with everything I wish the original did out of the box. Hooray!" Matthew Miller of ZDNET highlighted the watch's deep Fitbit integration and safety features, but was ambivalent toward its small size. Will Greenwald of PCMag praised the watch's design, performance, and health features, while Mark Knapp of IGN called it "elegant and performant" but "still not a killer". CNN Underscored's Max Buondonno and TheStreet's Jason Cipriani hailed its health, performance, and battery life enhancements. Writing for The Guardian, Samuel Gibbs appreciated the improved performance and battery life but was disappointed with the lack of advanced health features and ability to be repaired. Engadget's Cherlynn Low was conflicted, commending Google's efforts to close the gap between other smartwatches but still finding it mediocre overall; Inverse's Raymond Wong agreed, calling it "a better smartwatch, but not the best". Elizabeth de Luna of Mashable described the watch as "playing catch-up to the Apple Watch", while Robert Leedham of GQ thought it was the ideal smartwatch for those indifferent toward smartwatches.
