= Data Studio =

Tool for converting data into reports and dashboards

- Developer: Google
- Release: March 15, 2016; 10 years ago

Stable release(s) [±]
- Android: 2.0 (Build 929542923) / June 10, 2026; 8 days ago
- iOS: 2.4 / June 11, 2026; 7 days ago
- Operating system: Android 7+; iOS 17+; Web
- Type: Web analytics, Data visualization
- Website: datastudio.google.com

Data Studio (formerly Google Data Studio and Looker Studio) is an online tool for converting data into customizable, informative reports and dashboards. Looker Studio was announced by Google on March 15, 2016 as part of the enterprise Google Analytics 360 suite, and a free version was made available for individuals and small teams in May 2016.

== Rebranding ==
In June 2019, Google acquired data analytics company Looker for $2.6 billion to "help its customers analyze their data in a consistent way". The acquisition was completed in February 2020.

Initially, Google Data Studio and Looker operated as separate products within Google. Google Data Studio's offering was a simple, low-cost, and easy way to connect data sources and create dashboards, while Looker offered a more enterprise-focused solution with robust support for transformations and permissions.

In October 2022, however, Google announced the rebranding of Google Data Studio to Looker Studio. This announcement was made at Cloud Next 2022, Google's virtual user conference. At the conference, Google stated that Looker is set to become the name for all Google Cloud Business Intelligence products. This name change was also accompanied by more updates including key security and management services, integration with Google Sheets, and more visualization tools. Google also launched a new tier offering, Looker Studio Pro, with enhanced features for enterprise team collaboration and management.

In April 2026 Google undid the rebranding to call it just Data Studio.

== Plan offerings ==
Google continues to offer both Looker Studio and Looker Studio Pro plans. Looker Studio is available for free, while Looker Studio Pro requires an upgrade to a paid plan.

== Basic operation ==
In Looker Studio, users have the option to create a report from scratch or to use a report template from the Looker Studio Report Gallery. Similar to templates available on other Google applications, these templates are created to make it easier for users to build their reports while still allowing for customization of design elements and other alterations. Once a user has created a report, they will be prompted to then add a data connector to their report. These connectors connect with their data, allowing for Looker Studio to automatically retrieve this data instead of requiring the user to upload exports of data to create reports. Looker Studio offers over 600 partner connectors for users to choose from. Connectors for Google platforms such as Google Analytics or Google Ads are free to use, while others require a subscription from an outside platform. Users are also able to create their own connectors to any "internet accessible data source". Individuals can learn how to do this within Google Codelabs with this step-by-step tutorial.

== Customization and interactivity ==
Along with offering many template options for users, Looker Studio also has customization controls for users. For example, users can edit the layout, color options, font, and canvas size of a dashboard so that it showcases their data more effectively, and corresponds with the company's branding.

Additionally, Looker Studio reports are interactive not only for those who create them but also with whoever you share the report with. This means that everyone will have access to change dynamic control features such as date ranges or sorting options without the report setup needing to be updated.

== Charts and tables ==
When deciding how to visualize data, users can choose from 36 different chart types and variations. These charts are organized under the following categories: Table, Pivot table, Scorecard, Gauge, Time series, Line, Area, Scatter, Bar, Pie, Google Maps, Geo chart, Bullet, and Treemap. After choosing the visualization method, individuals will then define dimensions and metrics for the chart or table to generate. Google explains dimensions as "a set of unaggregated values by which you can group your data". Dimensions within a data source will appear in the color green. Metrics, however, are "a specific aggregation that can apply to a set of values". Metrics can be identified by their blue colored fields.

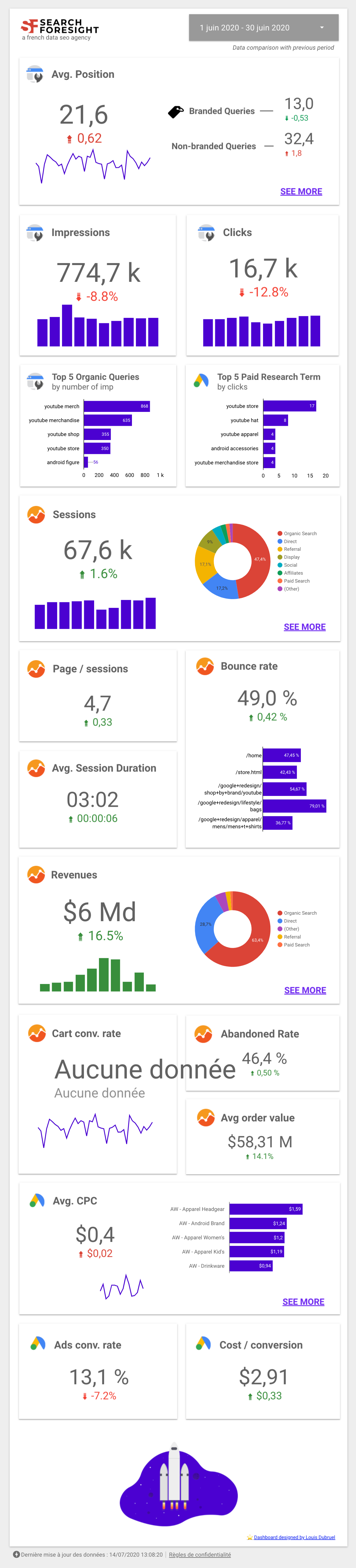
Looker Studio dashboard with various chart types

=== Table charts ===
Tables in Looker Studio use rows and columns to organize metrics. Tables are utilized to show "granular data, a large number of fields, or multiple metrics with very different units and scales aggregated for one or more dimension fields". There are three ways to utilize tables and pivot table charts in Looker. Users can display data with numbers, bars, or heatmaps. Users can then sort the data within these tables by two fields to allow for data to be displayed in a specific order. Along with sorting data, data can also be filtered using various condition statements in the SETUP tab.

=== Scorecard and gauge charts ===
When reporting on core objectives or high-level numbers, scorecard charts can display data in an attention-catching way. These scorecard charts showcase a single metric on the report, showing it as text. Scorecards can also communicate how a metric has changed over time using a comparison metric. The scorecard then shows this change as a percentage under the displayed metric. Another way users can call attention to a specific metric is by using a Gauge Chart. This type of chart monitors the performance of a single metric against a target, showing the progress similar to that of a car dashboard display.

=== Line, time series, area, and scatter charts ===
Line charts help show trends in data and compare metrics along an ordinal axis. Users can add multiple metrics to the chart to show their values over time displayed as lines, bars, or a combination of the two.

Another way to show how a metric changes over time is to utilize a time series chart. Time Series charts display a date or time dimension on the X-axis and a chosen metric on the Y-axis. Users can also add 3 types of trendlines to a time series chart in Looker Studio. These trendlines can be linear, exponential, or polynomial. In addition, a version of time series charts without lines, called sparklines, can be showcased on scorecard charts.

Area charts are similar to time series charts as users can only set a date or time on the chart's X-axis. The Area Chart, however, has a shaded area under the line to highlight the difference in values between lines. In addition, Line charts, Time series charts, and Area charts also have the ability to show cumulative sum values on the X-axis using the Cumulative option under the STYLE tab in Looker Studio.

Unlike line or time series charts, scatter charts showcase the relationship between two metrics as separate data points on a graph. Trendlines, however, can be added within Looker Studio to indicate the type of relationship these data points have including linear, exponential, or polynomial.

=== Bar charts ===
Bar charts are used to display "a few metrics against one or two dimensions". To be more specific, "one axis of the chart shows the specific categories (dimensions) being compared, and the other axis represents a discrete value (metric)". Like other table and chart options in Looker Studio, users can configure their bar chart in any of the following ways: horizontal bars, vertical bars, clustered bars, stacked bars, and 100% stacked bars.

=== Pie charts ===
Another way to display data in Looker Studio is with a Pie or Donut Chart. These charts show data as parts of a whole, with Looker Studio allowing up to 20 slices in a single pie chart. These slices showcase the dimensions that were defined by the user, and they are sorted in decreasing order according to the defined metric.

=== Google Maps ===
The Google Maps chart within Looker Studio behaves similarly to that within the Google Maps application, allowing users to interact with the chart to zoom in/out and move around the map. The variations offered for Google Maps charts are bubble maps, filled maps, line maps, and heat maps.

=== Geo chart ===
Similar to Google Maps charts, users can utilize the geo chart within Looker Studio to visualize "how a measurement varies across a geographic area". The zoom area property of geo charts also allows users to change the level of the geographical area depicted from world down to region. Geo charts can be used to display up to 5,000 data points, which are chosen by Looker Studio.

=== Bullet charts ===
Similar to the comparison options for Scorecard charts and Gauge charts, Bullet Charts are widely used to represent key performance indicators. These charts display a single metric benchmarked against target values, but also show different thresholds so users can easily see how far ahead or behind a metric is from its goal.

=== Treemap charts ===
Treemap charts are also offered within Looker Studio to display data in hierarchies based on defined dimensions. In this type of chart, each branch represents a dimension value, with its size based on the defined metric for the entire chart. This chart allows users to breakdown dimensions within Subtopics and Levels.

== See also ==
- List of Google products § Statistical tools
- Web analytics
- Data visualization
