= Area 120 =

Incubator for Google products

- Named after: 100% of time on 20% Projects
- Key people: Bradley Horowitz, Alex Gawley, Michelle Gonzalez, Balir Connolly, Gabor Cselle, Jackie Bernhelm, Elias Roman, Don Harrison
- Parent organization: Google
- Website: area120.google.com

Area 120 is Google's in-house incubator in which employees work on 20% Project product ideas.

The Area 120 division was created by Sundar Pichai in March 2016 and has since spawned over 200 projects. The objective for the Area 120 program is to incubate products that "graduate" back to Google.

In November 2021, the division was reorganized under a new division called Google Labs (unrelated to the defunct service of the same name).

Area 120 was significantly reduced as part of Google's January 2023 layoffs.

== Notable products ==
The program has funded more than 200 different ideas from Google employees. Notable product experiments which have emerged from Area 120 include:

- Aloud - an AI-powered dubbing solution for video creators. Graduated to YouTube in 2023 where it evolved into YouTube auto dubbing.
- Tables – a collaborative database program comparable to Airtable. Graduated to Google Cloud.
- Reply – an Android app which allowed users to insert pre-defined replies (called "Smart Replies") into conversations on messaging apps on their phone.
- Stack – an Android app that digitizes personal documents and extracts key information.
- Gamesnacks – an HTML5 games platform for mobile websites.
- Keen – a competitor to Pinterest.
- Byteboard – a product that interviews software engineering candidates. Spun out into a separate company in Oct 2021.
- ThreadIt – a short-form video communication service.
- Orion Wifi – a product letting businesses sell Wi-Fi capacity to wireless carriers.
- Shoploop – a video shopping platform.
- Touring Bird – a search tool for experiences in major cities. Graduated into Google Travel.
- Tangi – a short-form video site.
- AdVR – a product providing advertisements in VR.
- Chatbase – a conversational AI platform for building and analyzing customer service chatbots. Graduated into Google Cloud.
- AdLingo – a marketing platform for bringing conversational assistants into display advertising. Graduated into Google Workspace.

== Byteboard spinout ==
The Byteboard project was spun out from Google into a separate company in Oct 2021, due to Byteboard using Google employees as human evaluators of candidates for Google competitors, which raised ethical issues.
