= Jan Stenberg =

Swedish businessman

Jan Stenberg (1939–2015) was a Swedish businessperson and chairman of the board of Stepstone, Cygate Måldata, Service Factory, Marratech, Spring Mobil, Q-matic and Tific.

Stenberg was educated with a law degree from the Stockholm University in 1964, and joined Ericsson in 1967. He held a number of positions in Ericsson, including vice president before being hired as chief executive officer of SAS Group in 1994, a position he held until 2001. He was also chairman of TeliaSonera (1999–2000) and was announced as chairman of the would-be merger between Telia and Telenor, had the merger not failed.

Stenberg served on a multitude of boards and has held a number of higher executive positions in different corporations. At Ericsson alone—a career which lasted 25 years—Stenberg had served as the Executive Vice President of the Ericsson Group, the General Counsel and Secretary of the Board of Directors, the President of Ericsson Cables AB and the Head of Business Area Cables. Starting in 1985 and ending 1990, Stenberg was the Head of Business Area Public Telecommunications for Ericsson and, in 1992, Stenberg left Ericsson. The boards that Stenberg served on and chaired are also many. He served as the chairman of the board of directors for Service Factory AB, B2 Bredband AB, Stepstone ASA, Cygate AB, Karolinska University Hospital and ETOUR. These enterprises were mainly telecom and information technology companies. Stenberg was additionally a director of the Supervisory Board for Lufthansa and the Royal Swedish Opera.
