= Pixel Watch =

2022 smartwatch developed by Google

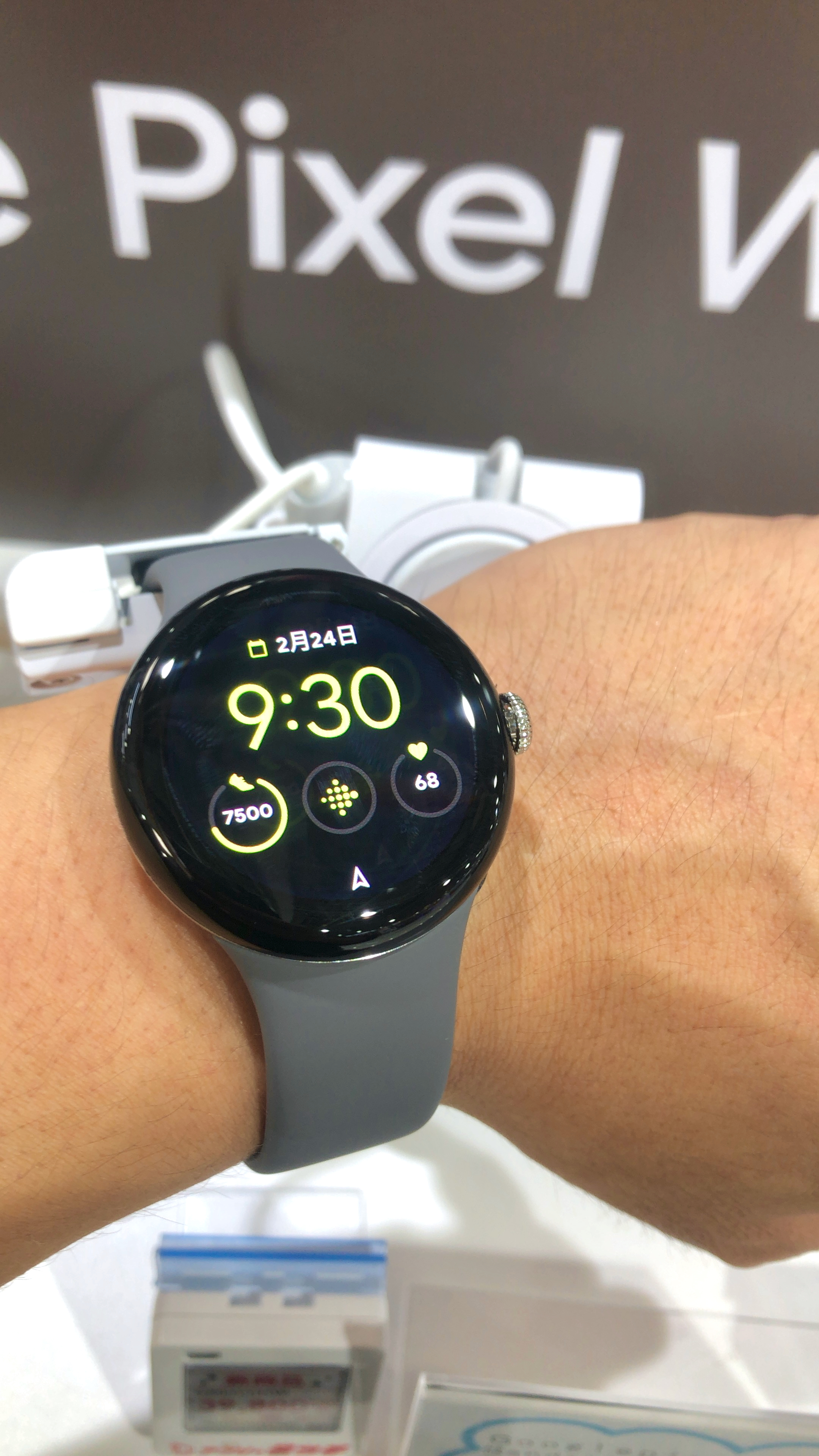
- Worn on the left wrist, with a Polished Silver case and a Charcoal Active Band
- Brand: Google
- Type: Smartwatch
- Series: Pixel
- First released: October 13, 2022; 3 years ago
- Availability by region: October 2022: Australia; Canada; France; Germany; Ireland; Japan; Taiwan; United Kingdom; United States
- Units shipped: 880,000 (Q4 2022)
- Successor: Pixel Watch 2
- Compatible networks: LTE; UMTS
- Dimensions: D: 41 mm (1.6 in); H: 12.3 mm (0.48 in)
- Weight: 36 g (1.3 oz)
- Operating system: Wear OS 3.5; Upgradable to Wear OS 5.1
- System-on-chip: Samsung Exynos 9110; ARM Cortex-M33
- Memory: 2 GB SDRAM
- Storage: 32 GB eMMC flash
- Battery: 294 mAh (lithium-ion)
- Display: AMOLED at 320 ppi with DCI-P3 color
- Sound: Speaker; Microphone
- Connectivity: Wi-Fi 802.11 b/g/n; Bluetooth 5.0; NFC; GPS / GLONASS / BeiDou / Galileo; USB-C
- Data inputs: Accelerometer; Altimeter; Ambient light sensor; Blood oxygen sensor; Compass; Gyroscope; Multipurpose electrical sensor; Optical heart rate sensor
- Water resistance: 5 ATM
- Codename: Rohan
- Other: Custom 3D Gorilla Glass 5
- Website: Pixel Watch

The Pixel Watch is a Wear OS-based smartwatch designed, developed, and marketed by Google as part of the Google Pixel product line. First previewed in May 11, 2022 during the Google I/O keynote, it features a round dome-shaped display as well as deep integration with Fitbit, which Google acquired in 2021. Two Pixel-branded smartwatches had been in development at Google by July 2016, but were canceled ahead of their release due to hardware chief Rick Osterloh's concerns that they did not fit well with other Pixel devices. Development on a new Pixel-branded watch began shortly after Google acquired Fitbit.

The Pixel Watch was officially announced on October 6, 2022, at the annual Made by Google event, and was released in the United States on October 13. It was succeeded by the Pixel Watch 2 on October 4, 2023.

== History ==
=== Background ===
In July 2016, Google was reportedly developing two smartwatches, codenamed "Swordfish" and "Angelfish", which were to be powered by the Android Wear operating system and expected to be released under the Nexus brand name. According to Business Insider, these watches were canceled ahead of the 2016 Made by Google launch event due to concerns from Google hardware chief Rick Osterloh that they did not sync well with the company's new Pixel devices; the smartwatches were eventually "salvaged" by LG and released as the LG Watch Style and LG Watch Sport in February 2017. Android Wear was rebranded as Wear OS in March 2018. In August, Wear OS director of engineering Miles Barr dispelled rumors that the company planned to release a Pixel-branded smartwatch that year.

In January 2019, smartwatch manufacturer Fossil Group agreed to sell some of its intellectual property on smartwatch technology to Google for $40 million, as well as transfer a portion of its research and development team over. In November, Google announced that it would acquire smartwatch and fitness tracker maker Fitbit for $2.1 billion, which Osterloh stated would pave the way for Google-developed wearables. The acquisition was completed in January 2021 following a prolonged investigation by the U.S. Department of Justice, with Fitbit absorbed into Google's hardware division. Fitbit co-founder James Park was subsequently appointed head of Google's wearables division. During the 2021 Google I/O keynote in May, Google announced Wear OS 3, a version of Wear OS co-developed with Samsung and Fitbit which incorporates elements of the former's Tizen operating system.

=== Development and release ===
In October, Osterloh revealed that Google and Fitbit were in the process of developing a Wear OS-powered smartwatch. Two months later, Business Insider reported that a Pixel-branded smartwatch codenamed "Rohan" was being targeted for a 2022 release, featuring a round bezel-less design, integration with Fitbit, proprietary watch bands, and health-tracking capabilities. Evidence unearthed that month indicated that the watch would be powered by either Samsung's Exynos system-on-chip (SoC) or Google's own Tensor chip, the latter of which had recently debuted on the company's Pixel 6 smartphone line. In April 2022, the "Fitbit" category was renamed "Watches" on the online Google Store, in anticipation of the Pixel Watch's impending launch. The same month, Google filed a trademark for the "Pixel Watch" name with the U.S. Patent and Trademark Office, while three models of the smartwatch were approved by the Bluetooth Special Interest Group. A prototype of the Pixel Watch was found at a restaurant in the U.S., an incident which drew parallels to Gizmodo's leak of Apple's iPhone 4 in 2010.

Osterloh unveiled a preview of the Pixel Watch on May 11, during the 2022 Google I/O keynote. In an interview with CNET, Park stated that there were no plans to shut down Fitbit, adding that the Google Fit app would co-exist with Fitbit on the Pixel Watch. Google CEO Sundar Pichai was seen wearing a Pixel Watch in September during an interview at the Code 2022 conference. Google officially announced the Pixel Watch on October 6, alongside the Pixel 7 and Pixel 7 Pro smartphones, at the annual Made by Google event. It became available for pre-orders on the same day, before being released in nine countries on October 13. When asked why Google waited so long before launching the device, Osterloh cited their acquisition of Fitbit and its expansive health platform as the primary catalyst which convinced Google to greenlight the Pixel Watch, adding that the company was committed to first-party wearables.

== Specifications ==
=== Design ===
The Pixel Watch sports a round watch face with a domed design, physical crown, and watch frame made of recycled stainless steel attached to custom-designed bands. 18 families of watch faces are available, each of which is highly customizable. It was available in four case–band color pairs:

Color options for the Pixel Watch
Case	Champagne Gold	Matte Black	Polished Silver	Polished Silver
Active Band	Hazel	Obsidian	Charcoal	Chalk

=== Hardware ===
The Pixel Watch is available in two models, one with and one without support for cellular connectivity. Its case has a diameter of 41 mm (1.6 in) and a Gorilla Glass 5 display. Powered by Samsung's Exynos 9110 SoC alongside the ARM Cortex-M33 co-processor, it contains a 294 mAh battery and 2 GB of RAM, as well as multiple sensors and wireless technologies. The watch features a USB-C charging mechanism manufactured by Compal Electronics. Due to the base's curved design, it can only be wirelessly charged with Google's proprietary magnetic charger, though some users were able to charge the device using other Qi chargers or via reverse wireless charging on their phones.

At launch, the Pixel Watch was only compatible with proprietary bands designed by Google, though the company stated that it planned to partner with third parties to develop additional bands in the future. By default, each Pixel Watch comes with a proprietary Active Band, with several other proprietary band options available at an added cost. Counterpoint Research calculated that the LTE version of the Pixel Watch cost an estimated US$123 to manufacture.

=== Software ===
The Pixel Watch shipped with Wear OS 3.5, and features deep integration with Fitbit. It is compatible with Android smartphones running Android 8.0 or above, and is accompanied by a Pixel Watch mobile app available for download on the Play Store. iPhones are not supported. Google added fall detection capabilities in February 2023. It was updated to Wear OS 4.0 in October 2023.

Google has announced that Wear OS 6 will not support the 1st gen Pixel Watch.

== Marketing ==
Actor Simu Liu, who previously served as brand ambassador for the Pixel 6 series in Canada, participated in an advertising campaign developed by Cossette for the Pixel Watch in May 2023.

== Reception ==
=== Critical response ===
Following the announcement of the Pixel Watch and Pixel Tablet at the 2022 Google I/O, Jon Porter of The Verge opined that Google was taking a subtle approach at Apple's "walled garden" ecosystem strategy. This was echoed by International Data Corporation research director Ramon Llamas, who believed that Google was aiming to become a "head-on competitor to Apple". Kate Kozuch of Tom's Guide praised the watch's sleek visual design. Victoria Song of The Verge quelled fears over the watch's reported 24-hour battery life, declaring it was "decent" when compared to similar smartwatches.

The Pixel Watch was positively received upon its launch. Lisa Eadicicco of CNET and Cherlynn Low of Engadget lauded its design and health features, with Eadicicco likening it to "a hybrid of Fitbit and the Apple Watch", but both criticized the battery life. Song called the Pixel Watch "good-but-not-yet-great". Wired's Julian Chokkattu echoed these sentiments, but argued that its "accuracy, elegance, and comfort" compensated its shortcomings. CNN Underscored reviewer Max Buondonno praised the Pixel Watch's sleek design and the performance of Wear OS 3.5, but felt that the battery life was subpar and the screen was not large enough. Nicole Nguyen of The Wall Street Journal did not find the smartwatch particularly astounding and noted several software bugs, but ultimately deemed it a worthy companion to the Pixel phone.

=== Commercial reception ===
Analyst firm Canalys calculated that Google shipped an estimated 880,000 Pixel Watches during the fourth quarter of 2022, constituting 22 percent of Google's total wearable sales, which include Fitbit products. The Pixel Watch's launch allowed Google to obtain 8 percent of the wearable market share, jumping 16 percent from fourth place to second place, behind Apple. The Pixel Watch Android app had amassed more than 500,000 downloads by February 2023.

== Successor ==
The Pixel Watch was succeeded by the Pixel Watch 2 in October 2023.

== See also ==
- Apple Watch
- Samsung Galaxy Watch series
