= Google Fast Flip =

Online news aggregator from Google

- Screenshot of the Fast Flip homepage
- Website type: News
- Available in: English
- Owner: Google
- Creator: Google
- Website: fastflip.googlelabs.com
- Commercial: Yes
- Registration: Not required
- Launched: 14 September 2009
- Current status: Discontinued

Google Fast Flip was an online news aggregator from Google Inc. that mimicked the experience of flicking through a newspaper or magazine, allowing visual search of stories in manner similar to microfiche. It was launched in beta by Google Labs at the TechCrunch 50 conference in September 2009.

The site presented images of stories from Google's news partners, which could be clicked on to navigate to the story on the news provider's own website. Stories could be scrolled between using the mouse or cursor keys. The presentation of stories used a similar algorithm to Google News, but stories could be ordered by publication as well as by subject. Krishna Bharat of Google News has said that "Fast Flip is mostly for longer shelf-life content, the kind of content you want to recommend to other people." Fast Flip was created after Larry Page "asked why the web was not more like a magazine, allowing users to flip from screen to screen seamlessly." Fast Flip was available as well on iPhone and Android mobile devices.

Users of Fast Flip were able to follow friends and topics, find new content, and to create their own customized magazines around their searches.

At launch, there were 39 mainly US-based news partners. Google said that it would share the majority of revenue from contextual adverts with its news partners.

Fast Flip was praised for allowing visual, fast and serendipitous browsing of news stories, but it has been criticized as being a novelty, anachronistic, as it emulates print media, limits navigation and presents few news sources, and as being more focused on the needs of publishers than of readers. Its visual search has been compared to the beta visual search of Microsoft Bing and to The Onion's microfiche iPhone app. Fast Flip has also been cited as a demonstration of Google's power in the news marketplace; by setting up another news interface that uses publishers' content without returning much value.

In September 2011, Google announced it would discontinue a number of its products, including Google Fast Flip.

== See also ==
- List of Google services and tools
- Google Currents
