= Nest Wifi =

Mesh-capable wireless router developed by Google

Google Nest Wifi
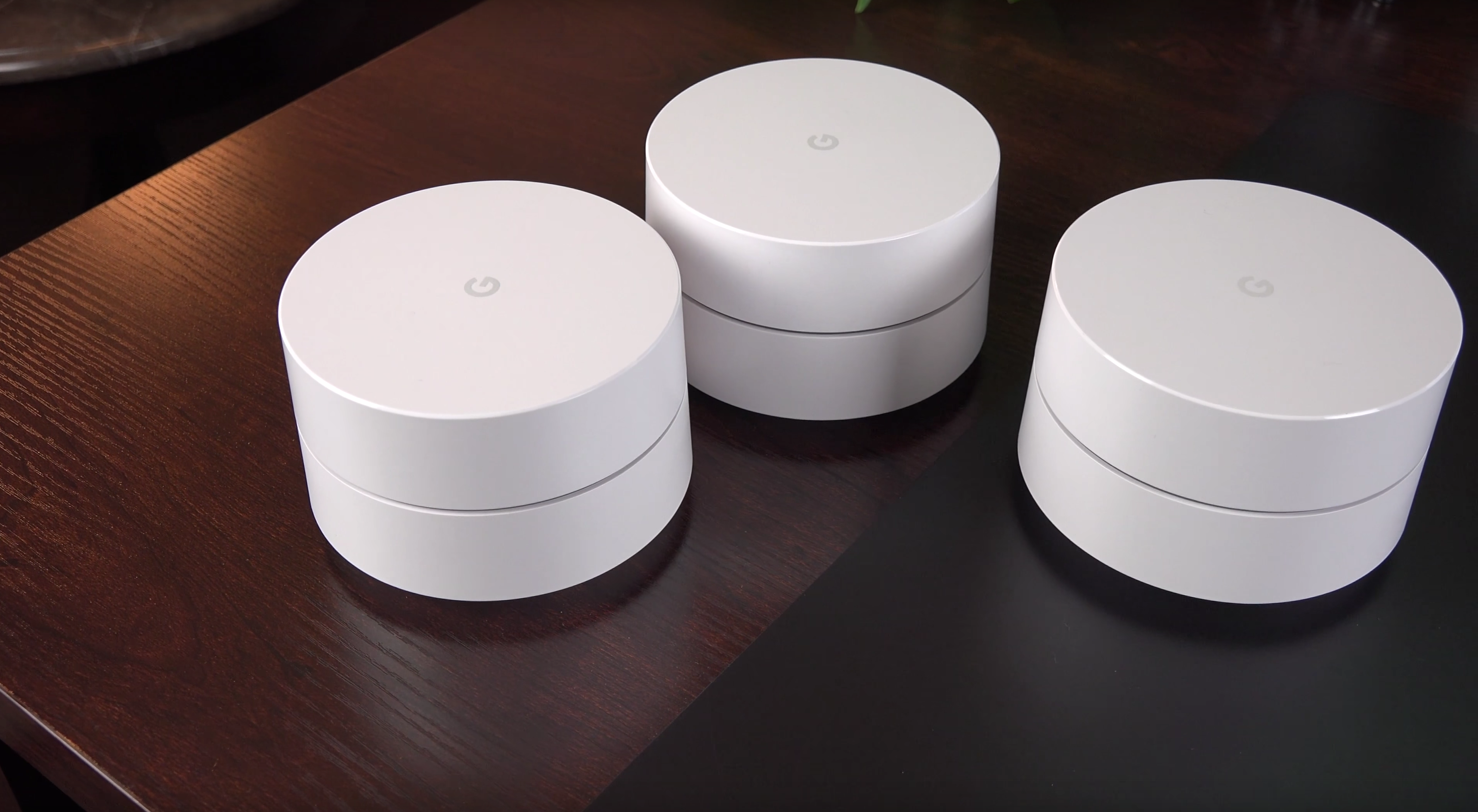
- First generation Google Wifi routers
- Developer: Google
- Manufacturer: Google
- Type: Router
- Released: First generation (Google Wifi): December 5, 2016; 9 years ago (United States); Second generation (Nest WiFi): November 4, 2019; 7 years ago (United States); Third generation (Nest WiFi Pro): October 27, 2022; 4 years ago (United States)
- System on a chip: First generation: Qualcomm IPQ4019; Second generation - Router: Qualcomm QCS404; Second generation - Point: Qualcomm QCS405; Third generation: Qualcomm IPQ5018
- CPU: Qualcomm
- Input: Smartphone
- Dimensions: First generation: Diameter: 4.17 inches (106 mm) Height: 2.70 inches (69 mm); Second generation - Router: Diameter: 4.33 inches (110 mm) Height: 3.56 inches (90 mm); Second generation - Point: Diameter: 4.02 inches (102 mm) Height: 3.43 inches (87 mm); Third generation: Width: 4.60 inches (117 mm) Height: 5.11 inches (130 mm)
- Weight: First generation: 12 oz (340 g); Second generation - Router: 13 oz (370 g); Second generation - Point: 12 oz (340 g); Third generation: 15.873 oz (450.0 g)
- Website: store.google.com/product/google_wifi

Nest Wifi, its predecessor the Google Wifi, and the Nest Wifi's successor, the Nest Wifi Pro, are a line of mesh-capable wireless routers and add-on points developed by Google as part of the Google Nest family of products. The first generation was announced on October 4, 2016, and released in the United States on December 5, 2016. The second generation, distinct in being released as two separate offerings, a "router" and "point", were announced at the Pixel 4 hardware event on October 15, 2019, and was released in the United States on November 4, 2019. The third generation was announced on October 4, 2022, two days prior to the Pixel 7 Fall 2022 event. This generation returned to a single model, doing away with the "router/point" variants, and was released in the United States on October 27, 2022.

The Nest Wifi aims to provide enhanced Wi-Fi coverage through the setup of multiple Nest Wifi devices in a home. Nest Wifi automatically switches between access points depending on signal strength.

== History ==
=== First generation ===
Android Police reported in September 2016 that Google was preparing to introduce a mesh-capable wireless router with enhanced range, along with its October 4 date of announcement and US$129 price point. Google Wifi was officially announced on October 4, 2016, with expected availability in the United States in December. The device became available in the United States on December 5, 2016, in the United Kingdom on April 6, 2017, in Canada on April 28, 2017, in France and Germany on June 26, 2017, in Australia on July 20, 2017, in Hong Kong and Singapore on August 30, 2017, and in Philippines on June 26, 2018.

The first generation Google Wifi features 802.11ac connectivity with 2.4 GHz and 5 GHz channels, 2x2 antennas, and support for beamforming. It has two gigabit Ethernet ports, and contains a quad-core processor with 512 MB RAM and 4 GB flash memory. Wi-Fi access can be controlled through a companion mobile app.

In 2020, Google relaunched the first-generation Google Wifi, with minor hardware changes and at a lower price.

=== Second generation ===
The second generation of the product was officially announced at the Pixel 4 hardware event on October 15, 2019, renamed as Google Nest Wifi as part of the company's shift towards its rebranding of all its smart home products to the Google Nest name. It adds a smart speaker equipped add-on point. Internally, a few changes were made, such as a quad-core 64-bit ARM CPU 1.4 GHz and a machine learning hardware engine for both the router and point, as well as IEEE 802.15.4 Thread support. The router has 1 GB RAM and 4 GB flash memory and supports AC2200 4x4 MU-MIMO whereas the point has 768 MB RAM and 512 MB flash memory and supports AC1200 2x2 MU-MIMO.

== Feature comparison ==
Model	Introduced	Wi-Fi speed rating	Ethernet ports		Memory		Speaker	Thread support	Matter support
Model	Introduced	Wi-Fi speed rating	WAN	LAN	RAM	Flash	Speaker	Thread support	Matter support
First generation
Google Wifi	2016	AC1200	Yes	Yes	512 MB	4 GB	No	No	No
Second generation
Nest Wifi router	2019	AC2200	Yes	Yes	1 GB	4 GB	No	1.2	Abandoned
Nest Wifi point	2019	AC1200	No	No	768 MB	512 MB	Yes	1.2	Abandoned
Third generation
Nest Wifi Pro	2022	AXE5400	Yes	Yes	1 GB	4 GB	No	1.4	Yes

== Reception ==
Technology websites Engadget and CNET praised the device's ease of setup, design and speed, but criticized its lack of customizable options, such as no settings for MAC filtering, content filtering, or Dynamic DNS. The Verge also praised its design and ease of use.

== See also ==
- Google OnHub
