= Google Tasks =

Software developed by Google for task management

- Developer: Google
- Release: 24 April 2018; 8 years ago

Stable release(s) [±]
- Android: 2026.6.15 (Build 932131510) / June 18, 2026; 21 days ago
- iOS (Note: Including iPadOS): 26.24 / June 17, 2026; 22 days ago
- Operating system: Android 7+, iOS 17+; Web
- Website: tasks.google.com
- Repository: github.com/googleworkspace

Google Tasks is a minimalist task management application developed by Google and included with Google Workspace.

Included initially as a feature in Gmail and Google Calendar, Google Tasks launched as a core product with a standalone app in 2018. It is available for Android and iOS, as well as in the right-hand side panel on Google Workspace apps on the web and in Google Calendar.

== History and development ==
Google Tasks began as an integration within other apps in G Suite (now Google Workspace), allowing to-do items to be created in Calendar and Gmail. Upon graduating to a core service on June 28, 2018, Google Tasks launched as a dedicated mobile app in which tasks can be sorted into lists, managed, and completed. Google Tasks launched the ability to create tasks from Google Chat messages in 2022.

== See also ==
- Microsoft To Do
- Reminders
