= Google Helpouts =

Online collaboration service from Google

- Website type: Marketplace
- Available in: English
- Owner: Google Inc.
- Website: helpouts.google.com
- Commercial: Yes
- Registration: Closed as of April 20, 2015
- Launched: 4 November 2013; 13 years ago
- Current status: Closed, April 20, 2015

Google Helpouts was an online collaboration service from Google which launched in November 2013 and allowed users to share their expertise through live video and provide real-time help from their computers or mobile devices. As of April 20, 2015, Google closed Google Helpouts.

== Operation ==
People offering help through Helpouts, called "providers," could be companies or individuals. Providers were required to be native English speakers and a resident of U.S., Canada, Ireland, U.K., Australia or New Zealand. They created and maintained listings that explained what they offered, their qualifications, prices, and schedules. Providers were required to pass Google's screening process to qualify.

Every listing had a link to the provider's Helpouts calendar. Once a Helpout was scheduled, it could automatically be added to users' Google Calendar, and users could choose whether they wish to be notified through email or SMS.

All payments were done through Google Wallet. Prices were set by the providers, based on either a per minute or per Helpout session. At the end of each Helpout, users were asked to write a review. Helpouts offered a money-back guarantee. If a user was not satisfied with a Helpout, the user could apply for a refund within 72 hours from the end of their session. Google had a cancellation policy that stated that some providers may have a cancellation fee. In those cases customers were required to call in 24 hours prior to the session to avoid the fee, which was either 50% of the fixed session price or five times the per-minute rate.

On April 20, 2015, Go8 hadn't, "grown at the pace we had expected."

== Categories ==
Helpouts categorizes help into the following categories:

- Art & Music
- Computers & Electronics
- Cooking
- Education & Careers
- Fashion & Beauty
- Fitness & Nutrition
- Health
- Home & Garden
