= Tables (Google) =

Cloud-based collaborative database software

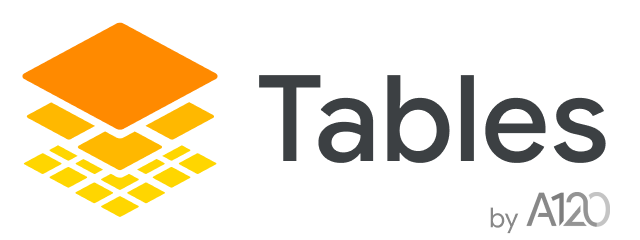
- Developer: Google LLC
- Release: September 22, 2020; 6 years ago
- Written in: JavaScript
- Type: Collaborative software
- Website: tables.area120.google.com

Tables was a collaborative database program developed out of Google's Area 120 incubator. Tables was available as a web application. The app allowed users to collaborate in real-time to track work more efficiently using automation. Tables was discontinued by Google on December 16, 2025.

== History ==
Tables originated as an experiment within Google's Area 120 product incubator, and launched to a public beta in the United States on September 22, 2020. It was first released as a test for a limited number of early testers on March 5, 2020, and then expanded to a larger early access program on May 5, 2020. Tables was not part of the Google Drive or Google Workspace service.

In June 2021, it was announced that the Area 120 experiment was a success and that Google Cloud "has committed to investing in this product area long-term".

In June 2023, features available in Tables became generally available in AppSheet as databases. AppSheet Database offers similar features and interface to Tables but integrates with the broader AppSheet platform.

Since December 2023, Tables no longer allowed new users to enroll in the beta. The developers continued to maintain the current beta version of Tables for existing users, but did not plan on adding new functionality. Users interested in using Tables should consider alternative services like AppSheet Database or Google Sheets to manage their workflow.

== Platforms ==
Tables was available as a web application supported on the Google Chrome, Microsoft Edge, Apple Safari, and Mozilla Firefox web browsers.

== Key Features ==
=== Core concepts ===
Tables anchored around several core concepts:

- Tables: containers of rows and columns of structured data. Columns (aka "fields") defined the table structure and enforced data type/format and relationships.
- Workspaces: allowed users to group tables together in a tabbed interface. Tables could be in more than one workspace.
- Views: allowed users to create customized views of the data with different layouts, groupings, and filters/sorts applied. Layouts allowed them to switch between different ways to visualize the table records, such as a ticket queue, kanban board, or map.
- Forms: allowed users to collect input without giving access to the table. Tables forms were separate from Google Forms.
- Bots: allowed users to automate tasks, such as send emails, update data, or send weekly reports, and send data to 3rd party webhooks to trigger Google Chat or Slack notifications or Zapier workflows.

=== Data types ===
Tables allowed users to set specific data types for columns:

Linked data	Connect related data from other tables together.
Simple data	Text, numbers, dates
Rich data	People, file attachments, locations
Rich entry	Dropdowns, tags, checkboxes, checklists
Calculated	Automatic ID numbers
Metadata	Row creator, updater, create/update time

=== Integrations ===
- Tables allowed users to import data directly from a Google Sheet or CSV file, and also performed a one-way recurring sync of data from a table into Google Sheets.
- Person-type columns in Tables allowed the user to search for and select Google users from your Gmail contacts.
- Sharing in Tables allowed the user to share with existing Google users, Google Groups, or with their entire work domain.
- Tables also offered a public API and the ability to call the Tables API via Apps Script.

=== Collaboration and revision history ===
Tables allowed users to collaborate in real-time on records in a table. Tables could be shared, opened, and edited by multiple users simultaneously and users were able to see field-by-field changes as collaborators make edits. All changes to table records were automatically saved to Google's servers, and a change history for records were automatically kept so past edits may be viewed and reverted to. Deleted rows, columns, tables, and workspaces could also be restored within a given timeframe.

=== Sharing and access control ===
Users could share their tables and workspaces from Tables using similar permissioning roles as Google Drive, such as editors, commenters, and viewers. Tables also supported an additional "writer" role that allowed users to modify rows in the table, but not the table or columns.

Users could share tables and workspaces with other individual Google users, Google Groups, or with their entire work domain.

Tables and workspaces could be shared independently of each other, and they could restrict access to a table within a workspace to provide more granular control of which users could see which data.
