= Marratech =

Business enterprise

Marratech AB
- Type: Privately held company
- Industry: web conferencing, videoconferencing
- Founded: 1998
- Headquarters: Luleå, Sweden
- Key people: CEO: Martin Gemvik; Chairman: Jan Stenberg
- Number of employees: n/a
- Parent: Google (since 2007)
- Website: www.marratech.com

Marratech was a Swedish company that made software for e-meetings (e.g., web conferencing, videoconferencing). It was acquired by Google in 2007.

== History ==
Marratech was founded in 1998, as a spin-off company from the Centre for Distance-Spanning Technology at the Luleå University of Technology. Founders include Dr. Dick Schefström (deceased), Prof. Peter Parnes, Johnny Widén, Prof. Kåre Synnes, Mikael Börjeson, Magnus Hedberg, Serge Lachapelle and Claes Ågren. The Marratech prototype was launched 1995 as part of an EU project called Multimedia Assisted Tele-engineering (MATES) project.

Marratech's first product, which offered voice, video, whiteboard and group instant messaging, was first released in November 1998. The first release required the presence of an IP multicast network and was built as a server-less architecture. The solution has since evolved to support both traditional IP Unicast and IP multicast, high security and multi-platform computing. For guaranteed, serverless, scalable data delivery over both Multicast and Unicast, Scalable Reliable Multicast (SRM) is used over the Real-time Transport Protocol, called SRRTP.

In 2004, Marratech introduced support for dialing out to IP telephones, land lines and mobile phones via the Session Initiation Protocol (SIP). In 2005, H.323 support was added to communicate with traditional video conferencing equipment.

In 2005, Marratech launched Marratech Free, a freeware edition of its product to host video chats online accessible to everyone.

In 2006, one of the first projects to handle remote, wireless eye examinations via video-conferencing was launched in rural India by the university of Berkeley and Intel, with Marratech providing the video-conferencing technology.

In 2007, Marratech's video conference software was acquired by Google. Most engineers and key personnel have moved to Google. The financial terms of the acquisitions were not released. This acquisition was announced a few months after Cisco acquired Webex. Google plans its use for their staff members initially and later they might come out with a massive change in the software for public use.

On December 12, 2009, Marratech announced that it would close down its website before the year-end. On February 19, 2010, Marratech announced on their homepage that it had suspended all its services. Its server no longer allows download of either client or server software.

== Description ==
Some of the key features included in Marratech are:

- High quality voice for groups with private audio feature
- Interactive group whiteboard
- Multi party video

Some of the key underlying technologies are:

- 256-bit Advanced Encryption Standard (AES) end-to-end encryption
- Support for Windows, Mac OS X and Linux on the client and server side.
- Support for bandwidth saving clusters
- Support for IP unicast, IP multicast or both
- Support for H.323 (dial in and out, E.164) and Session Initiation Protocol (SIP)
- H.264 video

The solution includes a freely downloadable client and a server, called the Marratech Manager.

Users include Alcatel Alenia Space, Verizon, the Swedish Police Department, The Swedish Army and a number of universities around the world.
