= Google OnHub =

Residential wireless router product from Google, Inc

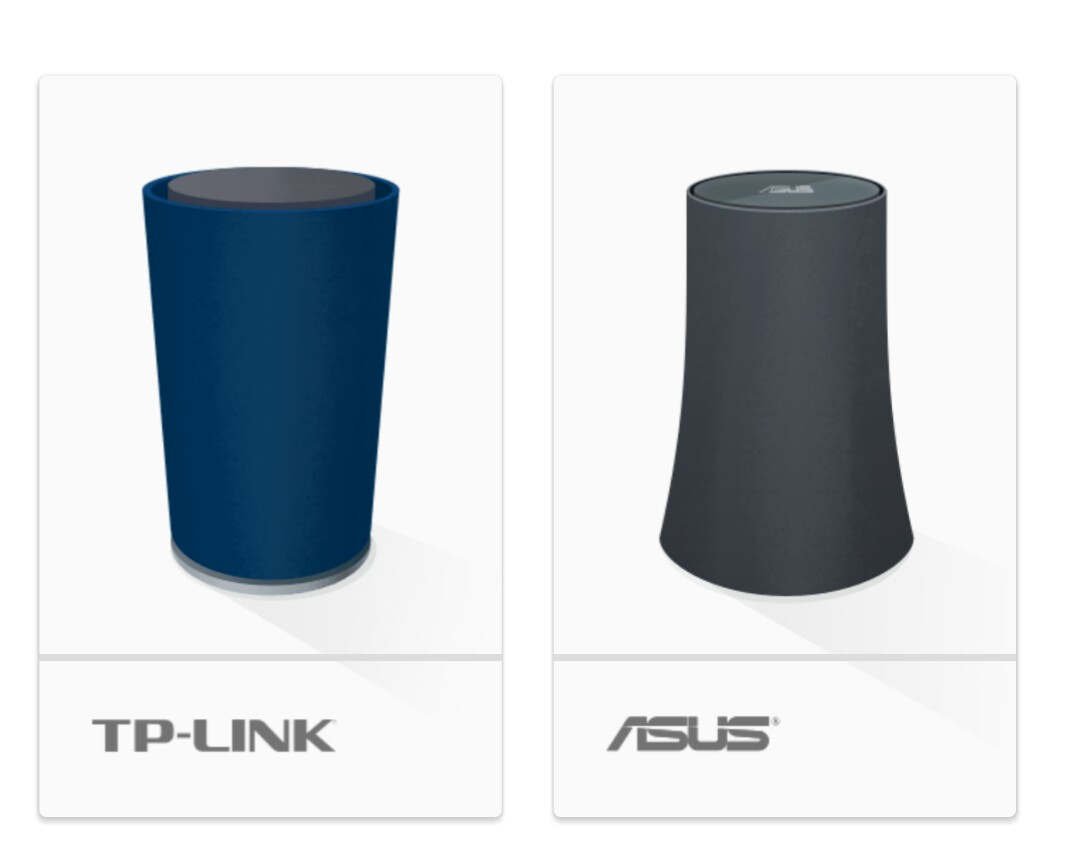
TP-Link and Asus versions of the OnHub router

Google OnHub was a residential wireless router product from Google, Inc. The two variants are manufactured by TP-Link and ASUS. Google's official tagline for the product is "We’re streaming and sharing in new ways our old routers were never built to handle. Meet OnHub, a router from Google that is built for all the ways you use Wi-Fi." In 2016, Google released the Google Wifi router with mesh networking, and combined its functionality and network administration with the OnHub so that OnHub and Google Wifi may both be used interchangeably in mesh networks.

Google touts the OnHub router as "easy to use and ready for the future" for its intuitive interface. According to OnHub specifications, both OnHub models are "Weave Ready" and "Bluetooth Smart Ready". The future enablement of these network protocols are possible as OnHub routers have an IEEE 802.15.4 radio antenna and a Bluetooth antenna. However, as of July 2020, the Bluetooth and 802.15.4 functionality have not been enabled.

OnHub routers have a dual-core 1.4 GHz CPU, 1 GB RAM, and 4 GB flash storage. Like Google Wifi, the OnHub creates a single SSID for both the 2.4 GHz and 5 GHz bands to simplify the Wi-Fi experience for the end user. The OnHub will automatically steer devices to connect to the band with the best connection.

In December 2021, Google announced that OnHub routers would no longer receive any software or security updates. After January 11, 2023, other features would be disabled like updating the Wi-Fi network settings, adding additional Wi-Fi devices, running speed tests, or using Google Assistant.

== Product comparison ==
	ASUS	TP-Link
Retail Price	$219.99	$199.99
Released	August 2015	October 2015
Size	7.94in x 5.03in x 5.20in	7.5in x 4.1in x 4.6in
Weight	1.66 lb	1.9 lb
Colors	Slate Gray	Blue or Black
Connectivity	AC1900	AC1900
Wireless Support	IEEE 802.11a/b/g/n/ac	IEEE 802.11a/b/g/n/ac
2.4 GHz & 5 GHz Wireless	Dual concurrent 3x3 with Smart Antenna	Dual concurrent 3x3 with Smart Antenna
Wireless Security	WPA2-PSK	WPA2-PSK
WAN Port	1x 10/100/1000 Mbit/s	1x 10/100/1000 Mbit/s
LAN Port	1x 10/100/1000 Mbit/s	1x 10/100/1000 Mbit/s
Ethernet Switch	QCA8337 Gigabit sw	QCA8337 Gigabit sw

The OnHub router from TP-Link is available in black or blue. The TP-Link router also has a removable exterior shell that is interchangeable other color options to help the OnHub aesthetically fit in various environments. The OnHub router from ASUS is available in Slate Gray. There are also non-aesthetic features unique to each model. The TP-Link model features a "specialized reflector" for an internal antenna that can be adjusted to extend Wi-Fi range on the 2.4 GHz band in one direction. The ASUS model has a "Wave Control" feature that allows users to prioritize a specific device on Wi-Fi by waving a hand over a light sensor on the top.

== See also ==
- Google Nest Wifi
