= Google Get Your Business Online =

Program

Google Get Your Business Online was a program launched by Google in 2011 aimed at increasing the web presence of small businesses and cities by providing free advice on search engine optimization and helping business owners update their information on Google for free. The program started rolling out across the US in 2012.

Partners in the program include the Association of Small Business Development Centers, SCORE and Intuit. A recent initiative of the program, entitled "Let's Put Our Cities on the Map" was launched in March 2015. According to USA Today, "Google has generated customized websites for virtually every town and city in the U.S. to enable local businesses to learn to improve the information that shows up on Google search, Google maps and Google+."

It has been described as a community-based organization aimed at helping small businesses succeed on the Web by bringing community members, business owners, and local business leaders together.

USA Today described the program as an "aggressive new program to help small businesses get found online." The program includes access to additional online resources including mentoring and workshops. Local chambers of commerce have worked with Google in a partnering basis. In some instances, Google works with a website development service called Yola which helps businesses build and customize a website.
