= Google Image Swirl =

Image search enhancing tool

- Website type: Image Search
- Owner: Google
- Creator: Google Labs experiment
- Website: image-swirl.googlelabs.com
- Launched: 17 November 2009; 16 years ago
- Current status: Offline

Google Image Swirl was an enhancement for an image-search tool in Google Labs. It was announced on the Google labs blog on November 17, 2009 with a limited number of search queries available. It was built on Google image search by grouping together images with similar visual and semantic qualities. It was suggested that such interface and grouping could help resolve queries that can have multiple types of results, are ambiguous, such as Apple, Jaguar, etc., and explore images associated with various viewpoints. This feature is no longer available.

== Bing concurrence ==
In September 2009, a few weeks before Google Image Swirl appeared, Microsoft announced Bing Visual Search Beta. However, exploration of images with Bing requires an installment and use of the Internet Explorer browser with Silverlight. Bing Visual Search is available only in English.

== Technical details ==
According to Google researchers Yushi Jing and Henry Rowley, and Aparna Chennapragada, Google Image Swirl leverages both the text information and the "visual" features associated with Web images (such as those developed for Google Similar Images) to determine how images should be grouped together.

== Closure ==
As part of an effort to refocus attention on more refined products, Google Labs was shut down in 2011. As a result, Image Swirl was discontinued.
