= Google Travel =

Travel planner mobile site

- Owner: Google
- Website: google.com/travel
- Commercial: Yes
- Registration: Yes, Google Account
- Launched: May 19, 2019; 7 years ago

Google Travel, formerly Google Trips, is a trip planner service developed by Google. It was originally launched as a mobile app on September 19, 2016, for Android and iOS, which was shut down on August 5, 2019. The service is now only available on the website.

== History ==
The mobile app launched on September 19, 2016, for Android and iOS. Google announced in May 2019 of providing desktop functionality to trip planning and integrating some of the trip planning features within Google Maps. In June 2019, Google announced that support for Google Trips would end on August 5, 2019. Users were then redirected to using the Google Travel website to plan their trips.

== Features ==
In order to use the mobile app, a Google account was required. Google Travel allows users to plan for upcoming trips with summarizing info about the user's destination in several categories such as day plans, reservations, and things to do. The discontinued app launched with complete day guides to more than 200 major cities. The mobile app also facilitated locating flight, hotel, car, and restaurant reservations for the trip based on emails from the user's Gmail.
