= List of Android apps by Google =

Google Android apps list

This is a list of mobile apps developed by Google for its Android operating system. All of these apps are available for free from the Google Play Store, although some may be incompatible with certain devices (even though they may still function from an APK file) and some apps are only available on Pixel and/or Nexus devices. Some of these apps may be pre-installed on some devices, depending upon the device manufacturer and the version of Android. A few, such as Gboard, are not supported on older versions of Android.

== Active ==
- Accessibility Scanner
- Action Blocks
- Adaptive Connectivity Services (formerly Connectivity Health Services)
- AI Wallpapers
- Android Accessibility Suite
- Android Auto
  - Android Auto Receiver
- Android AICore
- Android Device Policy
- Android System Intelligence
- Android System WebView
  - Android System WebView Beta
  - Android System WebView Canary
  - Android System WebView Dev
- Android TV Core Services
- Android TV Home
- Android TV Launcher
- Android TV Remote Service
- Backdrop Daydream
- Blogger
- Calculator
- Carrier Services
- Chrome Remote Desktop
- Chromecast Built-in
- Clock
- Cloud
- Compose Material Catalog
- Contacts
- Creative Preview
- Cross-Device Services
- Crowdsource
- Data Restore Tool
- Data Transfer Tool
- Device Health Services
- Device Lock Controller
- Device Utility
- Digital Wellbeing
- Dive Case Connector for Pixel
- Emoji Workshop Wallpaper
- Fast Pair Validator
- Files by Google
- Find Hub
- Fitbit Ace
- Fitbit Aira Air Update
- Fitbit ECG App
  - Jelly Jam
- Gallery
- Gboard
- Gemini Notebook
- GIF Keyboard by Tenor
- Gmail
  - Gmail Go
- GnssLogger App
- Google
  - Google App for Android TV
  - Google Go
- Google Admin (formerly Google Settings)
- Google Ads
- Google AIY Projects
- Google Analytics
- Google Arts & Culture
  - Google Arts & Culture VR
- Google Authenticator
- Google Automotive App Host
- Google Calendar
- Google Chat (formerly Hangouts Chat)
- Google Chrome
  - Chrome Beta
  - Chrome Canary
  - Chrome Dev
- GameSnacks
- Google Classroom
- Google Cloud Search (formerly Google Springboard)
- Google Connectivity Services
- Google Docs
- Google Drive
- Google Earth
- Google Family Link
  - Family Link Manager
  - Family Link Parental Controls
- Google Fi Wireless
- Google Fiber
- Google Finance
- Google Gemini
  - Google Gemini Enterprise
- Google Health
- Google Health Studies
- Google Home (formerly Chromecast and Google Cast)
- Google Keep
- Google Lens
- Google Local Services Ads
- Google Maps
  - Google Maps Go
  - Navigation for Google Maps Go
- Google Meet (formerly Hangouts Meet and Google Duo)
- Google Messages (formerly Messenger, Android Messages, and Messages)
- Google News
- Google One
- Google Opinion Rewards
- Google Partner Setup
- Google Pay
- Google Photos
- Google Pixel Buds
- Google Pixel Watch
  - Google Pixel Watch Faces
  - Google Pixel Watch Services
- Google Play
- Google Play Books (formerly Google eBookstore)
- Google Play Console
- Google Play Games
- Google Play Protect Service
- Google Play Services
- Google Play Services for AR (formerly ARCore)
- Google Sheets
- Google Slides
- Google Support Services
- Google Tasks
- Google Translate
- Google TV (formerly Google Movies and Google Play Movies & TV)
- Google TV Ambient Mode
- Google TV Home
- Google Voice
- Google Wallet (formerly Android Pay and Google Pay)
- Google Wi-Fi Provisioner
- Health Connect
- Likeness (beta)
- Live Channels
- Live Transcribe & Sound Notifications (formerly Live Transcribe)
- Looker Mobile
- Looker Studio
- Lookout
- Magnifier
- Motion Sense Bridge
- Online Insights Study
- Personal Safety
- PC Connect (beta)
- Phone by Google
- Photomath
- PhotoScan by Google Photos
- Pixel Camera
- Pixel Camera Services
- Pixel Launcher
- Pixel Live Wallpaper
- Pixel Stand
- Pixel Screenshots
- Pixel Thermometer
- Pixel Tips
- Pixel Troubleshooting
- Play Billing Lab
- Private Compute Services
- Project Activate
- Project Baseline
- Project Relate
- Read Along by Google (formerly Bolo)
- Reading Mode
- Recorder
- Screenwise Meter
- Security Hub
- Settings Services (formerly Settings Suggestions)
- SIM Manager
- Snapseed
- Sound Amplifier
- Sounds
- Speech Recognition & Synthesis
- Switch Access
- System Parental Controls
- Test DPC
- TV Setup
- Voice Access
- VPN by Google
- Wallpapers
- Waze
- Wear OS by Google (formerly Android Wear)
  - Wear OS System UI
- Wear OS Media Sessions
- Weather
- WifiNanScan App
- WifiRttScan App
- WifiRttLocator App
- YouTube
  - YouTube for Android TV
- YouTube Create
- YouTube Kids
  - YouTube Kids for Android TV
- YouTube Music
  - YouTube Music for Android TV
  - YouTube Music for Chromebook
- YouTube Studio (formerly YouTube Creator Studio)
- YouTube TV
  - YouTube TV for Android TV
  - Google TV

== Discontinued ==
- Abstracted Motion – Mural in A
- AdSense (merged with Google Ads)
- AdWords Express (merged with the main Google Ads app)
- AI Test Kitchen
- Android Auto for Phone Screens (merged with the Google Assistant)
- Androidify
- Android Dev Summit
- Android Things Toolkit
- Android TV Data Saver
- ARCore Elements
- Audio Factory
- Beacon Tools
- Cameos on Google
- Cardboard
- Cardboard Camera
- Cardboard Design Lab
- Cloud Next
- Cloud Print
- Currents (formerly Google+ for G Suite)
- Datally (formerly Triangle)
- Daydream
- Daydream Elements
- Daydream Keyboard
- DoubleClick for Publishers (merged with AdWords)
- Google Expeditions (merged with Google Arts & Culture)
- Fabby
- FameBit
- Fiber TV
- Flutter Gallery
- Google+
- Google AdMob
- Google Allo
- Google Apps Device Policy
- Google Assistant (merged with Gemini)
  - Google Assistant Go
  - Google Assistant – In the Car
- Google Body
- Google BrailleBack
- Google Cantonese Input
- Google Cast Receiver
- Google Clips
- Google Currents (merged with Google Play Newsstand)
- Google Duo (merged with Google Meet)
- Google Finance
- Google Fit
- Google Gesture Search
- Google Goggles (merged with Google Lens)
- Google Handwriting Input
- Google Indic Keyboard
- Hangouts (merged with Google Chat and Google Meet)
- Google I/O
- Google Japanese Input
- Google Korean Input
- Google Listen (merged with Google Play Music and Google Reader)
- Google Maps Navigation (merged with the main Google Maps app)
- Grasshopper
- Jamboard
- Material Gallery
- Measure
- MyGlass
- Google My Business
- Google My Maps
- Google News & Weather (merged with Google News)
- Google Now Launcher (merged with the Google app)
- Google Pay Send (formerly Google Wallet) (merged with Google Pay)
- Google PDF Viewer (merged with Google Drive)
- Google Pinyin Input
- Google Play Magazines (merged with Google Play Newsstand)
- Google Play Music (formerly Music Beta and Google Music) (merged with YouTube Music and Google Podcasts)
- Google Play Movies and TV
- Google Play Newsstand (merged with Google News)
- Google Podcasts (merged with YouTube Music)
- Google Primer
- Google Reader
- Google Santa Tracker
- Google Shopping (formerly Google Shopping Express and Google Express)
- Google Spaces
- Google Spotlight Stories
- Google Station Onsite
- Google TalkBack (merged with Android Accessibility Suite)
- Google Trips
- Google Voice (merged with Google Hangouts)
- Google Voice Search (merged with Google Now)
- Google VR Services
- Google Wifi (merged with Google Home)
- Google Zhuyin Input
- Hangouts Dialer
- Inbox by Gmail (merged with the main Gmail app)
- Intersection Explorer
- Ivy Big Number Calculator
- Jacquard by Google
- Jump Inspector
- Kormo Jobs (was only available in India, Bangladesh, and Indonesia)
- Motion Stills
- MyTracks (merged with Google Fit)
- Nest (merged with the Google Home app)
- Notable Women
- One Today by Google
- Pixel Ambient Services
- Playbook for Developers
- Playground (formerly AR Stickers)
- Quickoffice
- Scoreboard
- Science Journal
- Socratic by Google
- Soli Sandbox
- Spotlight Stories
- Stadia
- Google Street View (merged with the main Google Maps app)
- Tango (merged with ARCore)
- Task Mate
- Toontastic 3D
- Trusted Contacts (merged with Google Maps)
- VR180
- YouTube Gaming (merged with the main YouTube app)
- YouTube Go
- YouTube Remote (merged with the main YouTube app)
- YouTube VR

== See also ==
- List of Google products
- Google Mobile Services
