= List of most-downloaded Google Play applications =

This list of most-downloaded Google Play Store applications includes most of the free apps that have been downloaded at least 500 million times. As of 2024, thousands of Android applications have surpassed the one-million download milestone, with a significant subset reaching even higher thresholds. For context, in July 2017 319 apps had been downloaded at least 100 million times, and 4,098 apps had been downloaded at least ten million times. The 500-million download threshold for free applications has been established, as of 2024, to maintain the list's manageability and torch on the most widely distributed apps. It's worth noting that many of the applications in this list are distributed pre-installed on top-selling Android devices and may be considered bloatware by some people because users did not actively choose to download them. The table below shows the number of Google Play apps in each category.

Approximated number of apps in each category of downloads (as of 10 August 2024)
number of installs	number of applications
More than 10 billion	17
More than 5 billion	30
More than 1 billion	142
More than 500 million	264
More than 100 million	1,255
More than 50 million	2,619
More than 10 million	11,913
More than 5 million	20,193
More than 1 million	52,506
More than 500,000	72,680
More than 100,000	131,293
More than 50,000	157,067
More than 10,000	193,654

== Free apps ==
These lists are of the apps in Google Play that are free, and have at least 500 million downloads on unique Android devices:

=== Key ===
key
Yes*	Yes* marked with an asterisk are pre-installed only on some manufacturers devices
Yes	Yes marked with bold are necessary for the functioning of any Android device wishing to use any Google services

=== More than 10 billion downloads ===
These are the Google Play apps with more than ten billion downloads on unique devices:

App	Developer	Date Reached (Note: This date refers to the date in which the app hit the particular download mark in Play Store.)	Date Published (Note: This date refers to the date in which the app was released on the Play Store (worldwide), and not when the service was launched. This date can be found on the 'App Info' section in the details of the app in play store.)	Category	Pre-installed (Note: Pre-installed apps only refer to those apps which come pre-installed with any Android device and cannot be uninstalled. Their functioning can only be disabled.)
Google Play Services	Google	2020-08-01	2012-09-26	Tools	Yes
YouTube	Google	2021-08-04	2010-10-20	Video editor & social media	Yes
Google Maps	Google	2021-11-16	2012-12-12	Mapping	Yes
Speech Services by Google	Google	2021-11-18	2013-10-10	Accessibility tool	Yes
Google Search	Google	2021-11-19	2010-08-12	Search tool	Yes
Google Chrome	Google	2021-12-04	2012-02-07	Web browser	Yes
Gmail	Google	2022-01-16	2010-09-21	E-mail	Yes
Android Accessibility Suite	Google	2022-12-18	Unknown	Accessibility tool	Yes
Facebook	Meta	2023-03-01	2011-08-09	Social media	Yes*
Google Photos	Google	2023-12-17	2015-05-28	Photo/Video manager	Yes
Android System WebView	Google	2023-12-17	2015-03-10	Tools	Yes
Google Drive	Google	2024-01-01	2011-04-27	Cloud storage	Yes*
Android Switch	Google	2024-10-07	2021-07-21	File manager	Yes
WhatsApp	Meta	2025-01-01	2010-08-18	Communication	No
Gboard	Google	2025-02-26	2015-01-26	Keyboard	Yes*
Google TV	Google	2025-07-05	2011-06-03	Video player	Yes
Google Meet	Google	2025-07-05	2016-08-18	Communication	Yes*

=== More than 5 billion downloads ===
These are the Google Play apps with more than five billion downloads, but less than ten billion downloads on unique devices:

App	Developer	Date Reached (Note: This date refers to the date in which the app hit the particular download mark in play store.)	Date Published (Note: This date refers to the date in which the app was released on the Play Store (worldwide), and not when the service was launched. This date can be found on the 'App Info' section in the details of the app in play store.)	Category	Pre-installed (Note: Pre-installed apps only refer to those apps which come pre-installed with any Android device and cannot be uninstalled. Their functioning can only be disabled.)
YouTube Music	Google	2019-11-01	2015-11-12	Music	Yes*
Messenger	Meta Platforms	2021-05-15	2014-01-30	Communication	No
Google Hangouts	Google	2021-06-03		Communication	
Samsung Push Service	Samsung	2022-06-03	2013-03-29	Communicational	Yes*
Google Play Games	Google	2022-08-14	2013-07-24	Games	Yes*
Android Auto	Google	2023-06-03	2015-03-19	App manager for automobile	Yes
Google Calendar	Google	2023-06-03	2012-10-17	Calendar & organiser	Yes*
Instagram	Meta	2023-09-01	2012-04-03	Social media	Yes*
Google Messages	Google	2023-10-02	2014-11-12	Communication	Yes*
Digital Wellbeing	Google	2023-11-01	2018-08-08	Lifestyle	Yes
Carrier Services	Google	2023-12-02	2017-03-13	Communication	Yes*
Google Play Services for AR	Google	2025-01-01	2017-12-11	Tools	Yes*
Files by Google	Google	2025-03-01	2017-12-05	Storage cleaner & file manager	Yes*

=== More than 1 billion downloads ===
These are the Google Play apps with more than one billion downloads, but less than five billion downloads on unique devices:

App	Developer	Date Reached (Note: This date refers to the date in which the app hit the particular download mark in play store.)	Date Published (Note: This date refers to the date in which the app was released on the Play Store (worldwide), and not when the service was launched. This date can be found on the 'App Info' section in the details of the app in play store.)	Category	Pre-installed (Note: Pre-installed apps only refer to those apps which come pre-installed with any Android device and cannot be uninstalled. Their functioning can only be disabled.)
Google Currents	Google	2014-12-27	2011-06-28	Social media	Yes*
Google Play Books	Google	2015-06-01	2010-12-06	Books & reference	Yes*
Google News	Google	2015-09-20	2012-06-27	News & magazines	No
Google Street View	Google	2017-06-23	2010-09-09	Travel & local	Yes*
Skype	Microsoft	2017-11-02	2010-10-04	Communication	Yes*
Subway Surfers	Kiloo	2018-04-01	2012-09-20	Games & arcade	No
Facebook Lite	Meta	2018-12-16	2015-01-28	Social media	Yes*
Google Cloud Print	Google	2019-02-01	2013-06-12	Printing	Yes
Samsung Print Service Plugin	HP Inc.	2019-02-02	2013-11-05	Printing	Yes*
Samsung Internet Browser	Samsung	2019-02-16	2015-08-24	Web browser	Yes*
SHAREit - Transfer & Share	Smart Media4U Technology Pte. Ltd.	2019-04-01	2013-04-28	Tools	Yes*
Snapchat	Snap Inc.	2019-07-18	2012-10-29	Photo/Video editor, social media & mapping	No
Microsoft Word: Edit Documents	Microsoft	2019-07-14	2015-01-06	Word processor	Yes*
Microsoft OneDrive	Microsoft	2019-09-15	2012-08-28	Cloud storage	Yes*
Samsung My Files	Samsung	2019-10-02	2017-06-21	File manager	Yes*
Microsoft PowerPoint	Microsoft	2019-10-16	2015-01-06	Presentations	Yes*
Microsoft Excel: Spreadsheets	Microsoft	2019-10-18	2015-01-06	Spreadsheet	Yes*
Samsung One UI Home	Samsung	2019-11-02	2012-01-14	Personalization	Yes*
Samsung Email	Samsung	2019-11-15	2017-01-15	E-mail	Yes*
Samsung Voice Recorder	Samsung	2020-01-01	2016-03-24	Audio recorder	Yes*
Device Care	Samsung	2020-01-16	2017-06-01	Tools	Yes*
Samsung Members	Samsung	2020-01-16	2016-03-11	Tools	Yes*
ANT+ Plugins Service	ANT+	2020-02-01	2013-05-10	Health & fitness	No
Samsung Health	Samsung	2020-02-09	2015-04-07	Health & fitness	Yes*
ANT Radio Service	ANT+	2020-02-21	2010-11-05	Health & fitness	No
Samsung Calculator	Samsung	2020-02-21	2017-02-08	Calculator	Yes*
Candy Crush Saga	King	2020-04-01	2012-11-15	Games	No
TikTok	ByteDance	2020-04-11	2015-07-09	Video editor & social media	Yes*
Briefing	Flipboard	2020-05-11	2015-05-13	News & magazines	No
X	X Corp	2020-07-16	2010-04-30	Social media	Yes*
Netflix	Netflix, Inc	2020-08-02	2016-01-06	Media streaming	Yes*
Secure Folder	Samsung	2020-08-02	2017-01-09	Business	Yes*
Dropbox	Dropbox, Inc.	2020-09-02	2010-05-04	Cloud storage	No
Google Docs	Google	2020-11-01	2014-04-30	Word processor	Yes*
Phone by Google	Google	2020-12-19	2015-12-07	Tools	Yes*
Google Keep	Google	2020-12-20	2013-03-20	Notes & productivity	Yes*
Google Translate	Google	2021-04-04	2010-01-01	Translation	Yes*
Spotify	Spotify AB	2021-05-01	2014-05-27	Music & audio streaming	No
Google Clock	Google	2021-05-01	2015-06-18	Alarm	Yes*
Samsung Security Policy Update	Samsung	2021-05-01	2014-11-17	Productivity	Yes*
Samsung Notes	Samsung	2021-06-01	2016-08-15	Notes & productivity	Yes*
Calculator (Google)	Google	2021-06-16	2016-03-30	Calculator	Yes*
Free Fire	Garena	2021-07-17	2017-09-30	Games, action & shooter	No
Google Sheets	Google	2021-07-17	2014-04-30	Spreadsheet	Yes*
Contacts (Google)	Google	2021-08-14	2015-12-07	Contacts	Yes*
ShareMe	Xiaomi Inc.	2021-09-15	2017-11-07	File sharing	Yes*
MX Player	MX Media & Entertainment	2021-10-01	2011-06-18	Video player	No
Viber Messenger	Viber Media, Ltd	2021-10-02	2011-06-19	Communication	Yes*
Telegram	Telegram FZ-LLC	2021-10-15	2013-09-06	Communication	No
Google Lens	Google	2021-10-17	2017-10-04	Tools	Yes*
File Manager by Xiaomi	Xiaomi Inc.	2021-11-16	2017-10-25	File manager	Yes*
Mi Music	Xiaomi Inc.	2021-11-16	2019-05-26	Music	Yes*
Calculator (Xiaomi)	Xiaomi Inc.	2021-11-27	2017-08-31	Calculator	Yes*
Mi Video - Video player	Xiaomi Inc.	2022-01-01	2020-09-01	Video editor & social media	No
Samsung Cloud for Wear OS	Samsung	2022-01-02	2021-12-14	Cloud storage	No
Google Assistant	Google	2022-02-01	2018-01-18	Tools	No
Weather - By Xiaomi	Xiaomi	2022-02-02	2020-04-29	Weather	Yes*
Google Slides	Google	2022-02-19	2014-06-25	Presentations	Yes*
LinkedIn	LinkedIn	2022-03-04	2011-04-07	Business	No
imo-International Calls & Chat	imo.im	2022-03-04	2010-07-27	Communication	No
Microsoft SwiftKey Keyboard	Microsoft	2022-04-02	2010-09-22	Keyboard	Yes*
My Talking Tom	Outfit7	2022-06-03	2013-11-11	Games & casual	No
UC Browser	UCWeb	2022-07-01	2011-10-25	Web browser	No
Google Go	Google	2022-09-18	2019-08-19	Fast search tool	Yes*
Truecaller: ID & spam block	Truecaller	2022-10-01	2009-07-01	Communication	No
Picsart Photo Studio	PicsArt	2022-11-23	2011-11-04	Photo/Video editor	No
Clock (Samsung)	Samsung	2022-12-01	2016-10-26	Alarm	No
Google Assistant Go	Google	2022-12-18	2018-01-30	Tools	Yes*
Samsung Music	Samsung	2023-01-01	2016-02-17	Music	Yes*
Google One	Google	2023-01-15	2018-11-19	Cloud storage	No
App Vault	Xiaomi	2023-03-01	2019-09-23	App access tool	Yes*
Link to Windows	Microsoft	2023-06-03	2015-12-16	Communication	No
Zoom	zoom.us	2023-06-04	2012-09-10	Communication	No
Google Pay	Google	2023-08-03	2017-08-17	Finance	Yes*
WhatsApp Business	Meta	2023-08-03	2018-01-22	Communication	No
Samsung Calendar	Samsung	2023-08-05	2023-07-14	Calendar & organiser	No
Hill Climb Racing	Fingersoft	2012-09-22	Unknown	Games & racing	No
Ludo King	Gametion Global	2024-02-03	2016-02-20	Games & board	No
Roblox	Roblox Corporation	2024-07-02	2014-07-16	Games & MMO	No
Android System Intelligence	Google	2024-09-01	2018-10-09	Personalization	Yes
ChatGPT	OpenAI	2026-03-15	2023-07-25	Productivity	No

=== More than 500 million downloads ===
This is the list of the Google Play apps with more than 500 million, and less than one billion downloads on unique devices:

App	Developer	Date Reached (Note: This date refers to the date in which the app hit the particular download mark in play store.)	Date Published (Note: This date refers to the date in which the app was released on the Play Store (worldwide), and not when the service was launched. This date can be found on the 'App Info' section in the details of the app in play store.)	Category	Pre-installed (Note: Pre-installed apps only refer to those apps which come pre-installed with any Android device and cannot be uninstalled. Their functioning can only be disabled.)
LINE: Calls & Messages	Line Corporation	2016-05-22	2011-06-23	Communication	No
Duolingo	Duolingo Inc.	Unknown	Unknown	Games & education	No
HP Print Service Plugin	HP Inc.	2016-06-11	2013-05-14	Printing	No
Flipboard	Flipboard	2016-09-10	2012-06-21	News & magazines	No
Pou	Zakeh	2017-05-01	2012-08-05	Games & casual	No
Temple Run 2	Imangi Studios	2018-01-13	2013-01-23	Games & action	No
Clash of Clans	Supercell	2018-11-16	2013-09-30	Games & strategy	No
Microsoft OneNote	Microsoft	2019-05-01	2012-02-07	Notes & productivity	Yes*
8 Ball Pool	Miniclip.com	2019-06-01	2013-01-23	Games & sports	No
Uber	Uber Technologies, Inc.	2019-07-22	2010-10-28	Travel	No
B612 AI Photo & Video Editor	SNOW, Inc.	2019-08-01	2014-10-09	Photo/Video editor	No
Adobe Acrobat Reader	Adobe	2019-11-22	2010-11-15	Document reader	Yes*
My Talking Angela	Outfit7	2019-12-01	2014-12-03	Games & casual	No
Temple Run	Imangi Studios	2020-04-01	2012-03-27	Games & arcade	
Zombie Tsunami	Mobigame	2024-04-02	2013-09-10	Games & arcade	No
Likee	LIKEME PTE.LTD.	2020-04-02	2017-07-26	Video editor & social media	No
Samsung Link (Terminated)	Samsung	2020-04-02	2012-07-23	Cloud storage	No
Huawei Backup	Huawei Internet Services	2020-05-01	2016-04-13	Copy data	Yes*
YouTube Go	Google	2020-07-01	2017-11-28	Download videos	Yes*
Wish	Wish Inc.	2020-08-14	2012-07-26	Shopping	No
Shazam	Apple, Inc.	2020-09-12	2008-10-30	Discover songs & lyrics	Yes*
Pinterest	Pinterest	2020-10-01	2012-08-14	Social media	No
Opera Mini	Opera	2020-11-01	2014-11-24	Web browser	Yes*
SmartThings	Samsung	2020-11-15	2017-04-17	Lifestyle	Yes*
Ultra data saving	Samsung R&D Institute India Noida	2021-03-01	Unknown	Tools	Yes*
Hotstar	Novi Digital	2021-03-15	2015-02-11	Media streaming	No
Galaxy Wearable (Samsung Gear)	Samsung	2021-04-02	2013-11-18	Tools	Yes*
Sniper 3D	Fun Games For Free	2021-04-17	2014-11-13	Games, action & shooter	No
Phone Clone	Huawei Internet Services	2021-05-16	2016-07-15	Data migration tool	Yes*
Pokémon GO	Niantic	2024-01-01	2016-07-06	Games & MMO, AR	No
PUBG MOBILE	PROXIMA BETA	2021-06-01	2018-03-19	Games, action & shooter	No
Microsoft Outlook	Microsoft	2021-06-03	2015-01-28	E-mail	Yes*
Fruit Ninja	Halfbrick Studios	2021-06-15	2011-07-20	Games & arcade	No
AliExpress	Alibaba Mobile	2021-07-03	2012-09-27	Shopping	No
Google Maps Go	Google	2021-07-03	2018-02-06	Mapping	No
Gmail Go	Google	2021-07-17	2018-02-12	E-mail	Yes*
Amazon Shopping	Amazon Mobile LLC	2021-09-01	2014-12-10	Shopping	No
Device Help	Motorola Mobility LLC.	2021-09-01	2014-03-17	Tools	No
Slither.io	Lowtech Studios	2021-11-01	2016-03-25	Games	No
Worms Zone.io	CASUAL AZUR GAMES	2021-05-21	2018-04-02	Games	No
Wallpapers (Google)	Google	2021-11-18	2016-10-19	Personalization	No
My Talking Tom 2	Outfit7	2021-11-27	2018-11-06	Games & casual	No
Navigation for Google Maps Go	Google	2021-12-18	2018-07-25	Mapping	No
Microsoft 365 (Office)	Microsoft	2022-01-01	2020-02-16	Document editor/reader	No
Minion Rush: Running Game	Gameloft SE	2022-01-16	2013-06-13	Games & arcade	No
TikTok Lite	ByteDance	2022-01-16	2018-01-04	Video editor & social media	No
Motorola Notifications	Motorola Mobility LLC.	2022-03-04	2017-03-29	Personalization	No
Mobile Legends: Bang Bang	Moonton	2022-05-01	2016-10-05	Games & MOBA	No
Magic Tiles 3	AMANOTES PTE LTD	2022-05-16	2017-02-24	Games & music	No
Live Transcribe & Notification	Research at Google	2022-06-03	2019-06-03	Accessibility tool	No
Storage Saver (Samsung)	Samsung R&D Institute India Noida	2022-06-03	2018-04-12	File manager	No
Talking Tom Cat	Outfit7	2022-06-03	2010-08-06	Games & casual	No
InShot	InShot Video Editor	2022-07-01	2014-03-05	Video editor	No
Among Us	Innersloth	2022-07-02	2018-06-15	Games & social deduction	No
Booking.com: Hotels and more	Booking.com	2022-07-17	2011-02-04	Hotels & travel	No
MyJio: For Everything Jio	Jio Platforms Limited	2022-07-17	2018-03-09	Tools	No
Themes (vivo)	vivo Co., Ltd	2022-07-17	2021-07-28	Personalization	No
Bigo Live - Live Streaming App	Bigo Technology Pte. Ltd.	2022-08-01	2016-03-10	Video streaming & social media	No
Mi Calendar	Xiaomi Inc.	2022-08-01	2020-11-03	Calendar & organiser	No
Talking Tom Gold Run	Outfit7	2022-08-01	2016-07-13	Games & arcade	No
Google Meet (original)	Google	2022-08-14	2017-03-09	Communication	No
Google Wallet	Google	2022-08-14	2017-07-25	Finance	No
Phone Master – Junk Clean Master	Shalltry Group	2022-09-03	2017-04-19	Storage cleaner & file manager	No
Dr. Driving	SUD Inc.	2022-09-18	2013-06-19	Games & racing	No
Phoenix Browser - Fast & Safe	CloudView Technology	2022-10-01	2016-09-01	Web browser	No
Flipkart Online Shopping App	Flipkart	2022-11-01	2011-07-02	Shopping	No
FM Radio	Motorola Mobility LLC.	2022-11-01	2013-11-13	Music, audio, news & sport	No
Tiles Hop: EDM Rush	AMANOTES PTE LTD	2022-11-01	2018-01-16	Games & music	No
VivaVideo	QuVideo Inc.	2022-11-01	2013-03-21	Video editor	No
vivo.com	Vivo Website	2022-11-01	2020-03-11	Shopping & news	No
Amazon Prime Video	Amazon Mobile LLC	2022-12-01	2016-12-13	Media streaming	No
CapCut - Video Editor	ByteDance	2022-12-22	2020-04-10	Video editor	No
Cleaner (Xiaomi)	Xiaomi Inc.	2022-12-22	2022-02-07	Storage cleaner & file manager	No
ZEDGE: Wallpapers & Ringtones	Zedge	2022-12-24	Unknown	Personalization	No
Gallery (Google)	Google	2023-01-01	2019-07-23	Photo manager/editor	No
EasyShare	Vivo Communication Technology Co. Ltd	2023-01-15	2016-06-30	File manager	No
Traffic Rider	skgames	2023-02-01	2016-01-11	Games & racing	No
Heytap Pictorial	ColorOS	2023-03-01	2022-12-13	Personalization	No
Moto Actions	Motorola Mobility LLC.	2023-03-01	2014-09-16	Tools	No
Google Podcasts	Google	2023-04-01	2018-06-19	Audio streaming	No
Moto Widget	Motorola Mobility LLC.	2023-04-01	2020-08-18	Personalization	No
Samsung Global Goals	Samsung	2023-04-16	2019-08-19	Donations	No
Candy Crush Soda Saga	King	2023-05-04	2014-06-10	Games	No
AI Gallery	Transsion Holdings	2023-06-03	2018-08-15	Photo manager/editor	No
Mi Browser	Zhigu Corporation Limited	2023-06-03	2020-02-26	Web browser	No
Moto Display	Motorola Mobility LLC.	2023-06-03	2014-09-16	Personalization	No
WPS Office	WPS SOFTWARE PTE. LTD.	2023-06-03	2011-07-21	Document editor/reader	No
Daily Weather	Shalltry Group	2023-07-01	2018-08-22	Weather	No
My Talking Tom Friends	Outfit7	2023-07-01	2020-02-13	Games & casual	No
Carlcare	Transsion Holdings	2023-08-03	2018-01-04	Appliance insurance	No
PhonePe UPI, Payment, Recharge	PhonePe	2023-08-03	2016-10-14	Finance	No
SmartCaller - Intelligence Calle	Transsion Holdings	2023-08-03	2018-07-17	Communication	No
Waze Navigation & Live Traffic	Waze Mobile Ltd.	2023-12-23	2009-12-17	Mapping	No
Kinemaster - Video Editor	Kinemaster - Video Editor Experts Group	2025-03-01	2013-12-27	Video editor	No
Brawl Stars	Supercell	2026-03-28	2018-12-12	Games & action	No
Geometry Dash Lite	RobTop Games	2026-03-01	2013-8-14	Games & music	No

== Paid apps ==
This is the list of those apps in Google Play which are paid, and have at least 1 million downloads on unique Android Devices:

=== More than 50 million downloads ===
This is the list of the Google Play paid apps with more than fifty million or more downloads on unique devices:

App	Developer	Date Reached (Note: This date refers to the date in which the app hit the particular download mark in play store.)	Date Published (Note: This date refers to the date in which the app was released on the Play Store (worldwide), and not when the service was launched. This date can be found on the 'App Info' section in the details of the app in play store.)	Category	Price
Minecraft	Mojang Studios	2023-11-01	2011-08-15	Games & arcade	$6.99

=== More than 10 million downloads ===
This is the list of the Google Play paid apps with more than ten million or more downloads on unique devices:

App	Developer	Date Reached (Note: This date refers to the date in which the app hit the particular download mark in play store.)	Date Published (Note: This date refers to the date in which the app was released on the Play Store (worldwide), and not when the service was launched. This date can be found on the 'App Info' section in the details of the app in play store.)	Category	Price
Hitman Sniper	Square Enix Montreal	2018-07-11	2015-06-03	Games, action & shooter	$0.99
Stickman Legends Offline Games	ZITGA PTE. LTD.	2020-04-19	2017-05-10	Games & action	$0.99
Shadow of Death: Dark Knight	Zonmob Game Studio	2020-10-01	2018-04-03	Games & action	$3.99
Evertale	ZigZaGame Inc.	2025-01-01	2019-03-21	Games & role-playing	$0.99
Shadow Knight: Ninja Fighting	Fansipan Limited	2025-07-02	2020-08-19	Games & action	$0.99
Geometry Dash	RobTop Games	2026-03-15	2013-08-12	Games & arcade	$2.99
Live or Die: Survival Pro	Not Found Games	2026-04-05	2018-10-03	Games & adventure	$0.99

=== More than 5 million downloads ===
This is the list of the Google Play paid apps with more than 5 million and less than ten million downloads on unique devices:

App	Developer	Date Reached (Note: This date refers to the date in which the app hit the particular download mark in play store.)	Date Published (Note: This date refers to the date in which the app was released on the Play Store (worldwide), and not when the service was launched. This date can be found on the 'App Info' section in the details of the app in play store.)	Category	Price
True Skate	True Axis	2019-06-01	2013-07-19	Games & sports	$1.99
Poweramp Full Version Unlocker	Max MP	2020-02-01	2010-11-07	Music & audio	$6.99
League of Stickman 2020 - Ninja	DreamSky	2020-03-15	2016-09-03	Games & action	$0.99
League of Stickman - Best action game	DreamSky	2020-04-01	2015-06-30	Games & action	$0.99
Nova Launcher Prime	TeslaCoil Software	2021-10-17	2012-02-23	Personalization	$4.99
Grand Theft Auto: San Andreas	Rockstar Games	2023-07-01	2013-12-19	Games, action & shooter	$6.99
Monument Valley	ustwo games	2023-10-02	2014-05-14	Games & puzzle	$3.99
RFS - Real Flight Simulator	RORTOS	2023-10-02	2019-07-23	Games & simulation	$0.99
Terraria	505 Games Srl.	2023-12-02	2013-09-25	Games & adventure	$4.99
Threema	Threema GmbH	2024-02-03	2013-05-27	Communication	$7.49
Fruit Ninja Classic	Halfbrick Studios	2024-04-01	2010-09-15	Games & arcade	$0.99
Bloons TD 6	Ninja Kiwi	2024-07-02	2018-06-14	Games & strategy	$6.99
Empire Warrior: Tower Defense	ZITGA PTE. LTD.	2024-08-03	2018-05-28	Games & strategy	$0.99
Stardew Valley	Chucklefish Limited	2025-03-01	2019-03-14	Games & role-playing	$4.99
Zombie Age 3 Premium: Survival	DIVMOB	2026-04-05	2019-07-30	Games & action	$0.99
