= Google Opinion Rewards =

Mobile survey app

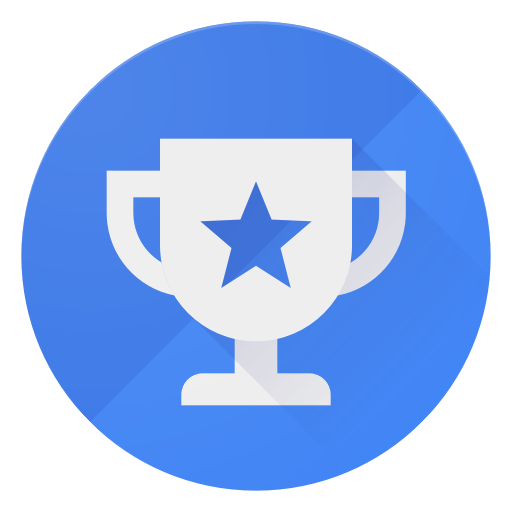
- Developer: Google
- Release: 6 November 2013; 12 years ago

Stable release(s) [±]
- Android: 2026061500 / June 22, 2026; 3 months ago
- iOS (Note: Including iPadOS): 1.26.060800 / June 16, 2026; 3 months ago
- Operating system: Android 7+; iOS 17+; ChromeOS
- Type: Survey
- Website: surveys.google.com/google-opinion-rewards/

Google Opinion Rewards is a loyalty program developed by Google. It was initially launched as a survey mobile app for Android and iOS developed by Google. The app allows users to answer surveys and earn rewards. On Android, users earn Google Play credits which can be redeemed by buying paid apps from Google Play. On iOS, users are paid via PayPal. Users in the available countries who are over 18 years old are eligible. Google Opinion Rewards works with Google Surveys, market researchers make the survey through Google Surveys and answers are received through Google Opinion Rewards by app users. This process provides surveyors with a large pool of surveyees quickly. This "fast and easy" surveying process has been criticized due to contention over the validity of results as well as concern over the privacy and security of the app users' data.

== History ==
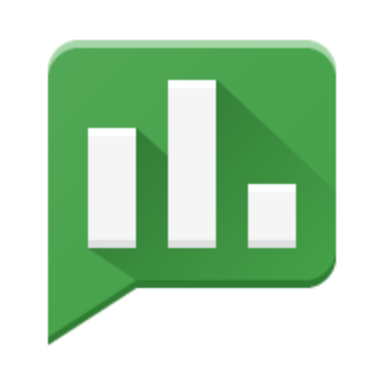
The original Google Opinion Rewards logo

In November 2013, the app was initially launched for Android users in US.

In April 2014, the app was made available in Australia, Canada and the UK. The first time the app has been available outside the US.

In August 2014, the app was made available to Germany and Netherlands.

In September 2014, the app was made available to Italy and Japan.

In June 2015, the app was made available to Mexico and Brazil.

In November 2015, the app was made available in Spain.

In May 2016, the app was made available to Denmark, Norway and Sweden.

In September 2016, the app was made available in France.

In December 2016, the app was made available to Switzerland and Austria.

In May 2017, the app was made available to India, Singapore and Turkey.

In October 2017, the app was launched for iOS users.

In November 2017, the app was made available to Belgium and New Zealand.

In May 2018, Google announced it would incorporate Cross Media Panel, another one of its rewards-based programs, into the Google Opinion Rewards program.

In December 2019, the app was made available in Taiwan.

In January 2020, the app was made available to Poland, Chile and United Arab Emirates.

In April 2020, the app was made available to Hong Kong and Malaysia.

In June 2020, the app was reached 50 million downloads on Google Play.

In November 2020, the app was made available in Thailand.

In July 2021, the app was made available to Czech Republic, Indonesia, Ireland, Russia and South Korea.

In March 2022, the app was made available to Colombia, Finland, Hungary, South Africa and Vietnam.

In September 2024, the app was reached 100 million downloads on Google Play.

The app is currently available for download in 39 countries.

== User interface ==
The Google Opinion Rewards app is composed of one main page, displaying the balance and available tasks, leading users to the survey and back to the main page once submitted. The drop-down menu navigates users to their Reward history, Google Play account, or Settings.

Each task consists of multiple pages, with the first explaining what the survey is about, followed by a series of multiple-choice questions, and finally one displaying the value of Google Play credits earned.

== Functionality ==
The application provides a surveyor with a large group of people to answer market research questions. Surveyors purchase this service from Google through Google Consumer Surveys, providing researchers the ability to create an online survey with the survey question they want answered and publish it to one of Google's platforms, including Google Opinion Rewards.

When users take a survey using Google Opinion Rewards, their answers are combined with the large pool of other respondents and shared with the market researcher. The respondents' demographics including age, gender and geographic location are inferred based on "anonymous browsing history and IP address" or taken from the demographics questions asked when setting up user account.

== App monetization ==
Users can earn from $0.10 to $2 for each survey. A minimum of $2 must be earned to be eligible to receive rewards. Apple users can cash out the value of their earnings to their PayPal account. Android users can transfer the value of their earnings into Google Play credits to purchase other apps from the Google Play Store. These apps include digital books, TV shows, movies, games, and apps. Credits can also be used to make in-app purchases.

The rewards must be redeemed within one year from the date received, or else they will expire.

== Criticism ==
Google Opinion Rewards offers benefits to both the surveyor and surveyee. The surveyor benefits from the large pool of surveyees achieved through the financial incentive and the wide demographic available online, in addition to the fast return of results, cost effective price and convenient surveying methodology. The surveyee benefits from the rewards offered in exchange for their time and opinion. However, online surveys have also sparked criticism due to highlighted concerns. The two common concerns regarding Google Opinion Rewards include the privacy and security of surveyee information and the validity of results.

=== Validity of results ===
The validity of results produced is a major concern regarding online surveys. Google Surveys have been designed on a "quick, inexpensive surveying" model compared to traditional interview or paper methods. However, this quick and efficient method to increase the sample size raises the concern of validity, as people are perceived to not pay attention when partaking in an online survey. This is known as 'inattentive response behavior', 'satisficing behavior' or 'careless responding'.

In addition to the suspected satisficing and forging of data for financial reward, surveyors have been critical of the program's 'random' sampling methodology or rather the lack thereof. Online surveys attract surveyees from a "highly selective subgroup of the general population" whereby all respondents have a specific 'similar' demographic, economic status, values and habits, which can affect the randomization of participants selected within the sample. As noted by social scientist Helen Ball, "It is not easy to use random sampling techniques with online surveys as there is no systematic way to collect a traditional probability sample of the general population using the internet"

To overcome these issues, Google has introduced measures to enhance survey credibility and reliability.

Addressing the concern regarding participants attentiveness, Google has introduced 'Attention checks' to deter careless responding behavior and forging of data. Google tests attentiveness by asking specific questions to ensure the surveyee is paying attention when taking surveys. Such questions include asking the surveyee to choose a specific choice from the multiple choices offered to ensure the question is read. If such questions are answered incorrectly the users account will be flagged and the user will receive fewer surveys. This action has increased researchers' confidence in the quality of their results and the "internal validity of the research."

Furthermore, the simple, "fast and easy" design adopted by Google for the online surveys has been recognised by economists Riccardo Vecchio, Gerarda Casoa, Luigi Cembaloa and Massimiliano Borrelloa as an effective display to ensure questions are understood and answered correctly, further enhancing the reliability of the results. They state, "After beginning a survey, Google Opinion Rewards presents only one question to the user at a time, and they are only presented with the next question when they have answered the one presented to them. The presentation of each question is plain to ensure minimal misinterpretation of individuals in the user base."

=== Privacy and security of surveyee information ===
Privacy and security of surveyee information are of concern as Google Opinion Rewards collects information about the surveyee including their name, age and location in addition to the information provided in their responses. While Google has been criticized for collecting data of users such as with their Screenwise Meter, people are generally aware that Google collects data, which Google claims is for the purpose of improving their services, however, users are worried their data would be sold to and accessed by other parties which may use the data for nefarious purposes or even spamming and targeted advertising.

While adding this information online provides a form of transparency, contention remains as the extensive list of 'Data Linked To You' contains private information considered highly intrusive. Furthermore, users also remain unsure what 'broad terms' like 'other' data mean to their privacy, which falls under data that is linked to the user. Such data is collected and shared with the market researcher despite the user being uncertain about what it entails. It is for this reason that paid online surveys are often seen or perceived as a trade-off whereby, those surveyed trade their privacy for a reward.

While Google clearly states its privacy policy, it has not disclosed the security measures in place to protect the app users' data that has been collected as it may contain private information that is highly demanded. Therefore, the security is especially of concern due to the information being stored online, which is susceptible to being intercepted or accessed by cyber criminals during a cyberattack.

== See also ==
- Crowdsource (app)
- Google Surveys
- Survey data collection
- Paid survey
