= Voice Access =

Accessibility software

- Developer: Google
- Initial release: September 2018; 7 years ago
- Stable release: 16.0 (Build 772996896) / 18 June 2025; 7 months ago
- Operating system: Android 9+
- Type: Accessibility app

Voice Access is a mobile accessibility app developed by Google. Voice access lets users control their phones using their voices. Voice access is used by saying "Hey Google, Voice Access" to Google Assistant.

== History ==
Voice Access was in beta from last 2 years before releasing.

Later, it was launched in 2018.

== Features ==
The features of the app are designed to help make phones more accessible to people with disabilities, but can also be used by non-disabled people whose hands are full.

== See also ==
- List of Android apps by Google
