= Latvian Music Producers Association =

Latvian phonographic industry association

The Latvian Performers' and Producers' Association (Latvian: Latvijas Izpildītāju un producentu apvienība, LaIPA) is a National ISRC Agency of the International Federation of the Phonographic Industry with the task of representing the Latvian music industry for both national and international recording artists of all genres. Goals of the organisation are supporting Latvian artists and producers and promote development of Latvian music industry and export of music produced in Latvia, to promote and support creation of competitive music records and increase utilization of Latvian music by educating Latvian performers and producers, to officially represent Latvian music industry in Europe and international showcases, fairs and exhibitions, and to educate members of Latvian music industry about the issues of music export and global trends. The company also certifies albums and music videos based on unit sales and compiles the country's music chart.

== Charts ==
The Latvian music charts are compiled by LaIPA and published by the online music magazine ParMūziku.lv. There are three weekly charts based on digital sales and streaming:

- Top 20 singles
- Top 10 domestic singles
- Top 20 albums

There are also two airplay-based charts:

- Top 20 singles
- Top 10 domestic singles

== Certification awards ==
=== Albums ===
Award	Certification levels timeline	
Award	Until 2011	From 2011
Gold	4,000	5,000
Platinum	8,000	9,000

=== Videos ===
Award	Certification levels timeline	
Award	Until 2011	From 2011
Gold	—	5,000
Platinum	—	8,000

=== Singles ===
In 2024, LaIPA introduced a certification system for singles released from 2022 onwards, using streaming data to determine award levels. The thresholds are set at 2,000,000 streams for Gold and 4,000,000 streams for Platinum. The data is collected from platforms including Spotify, Deezer, Apple Music, and YouTube Music, as well as from downloads on iTunes.
