= Ivan Bakaidov =

Russian programmer and blogger

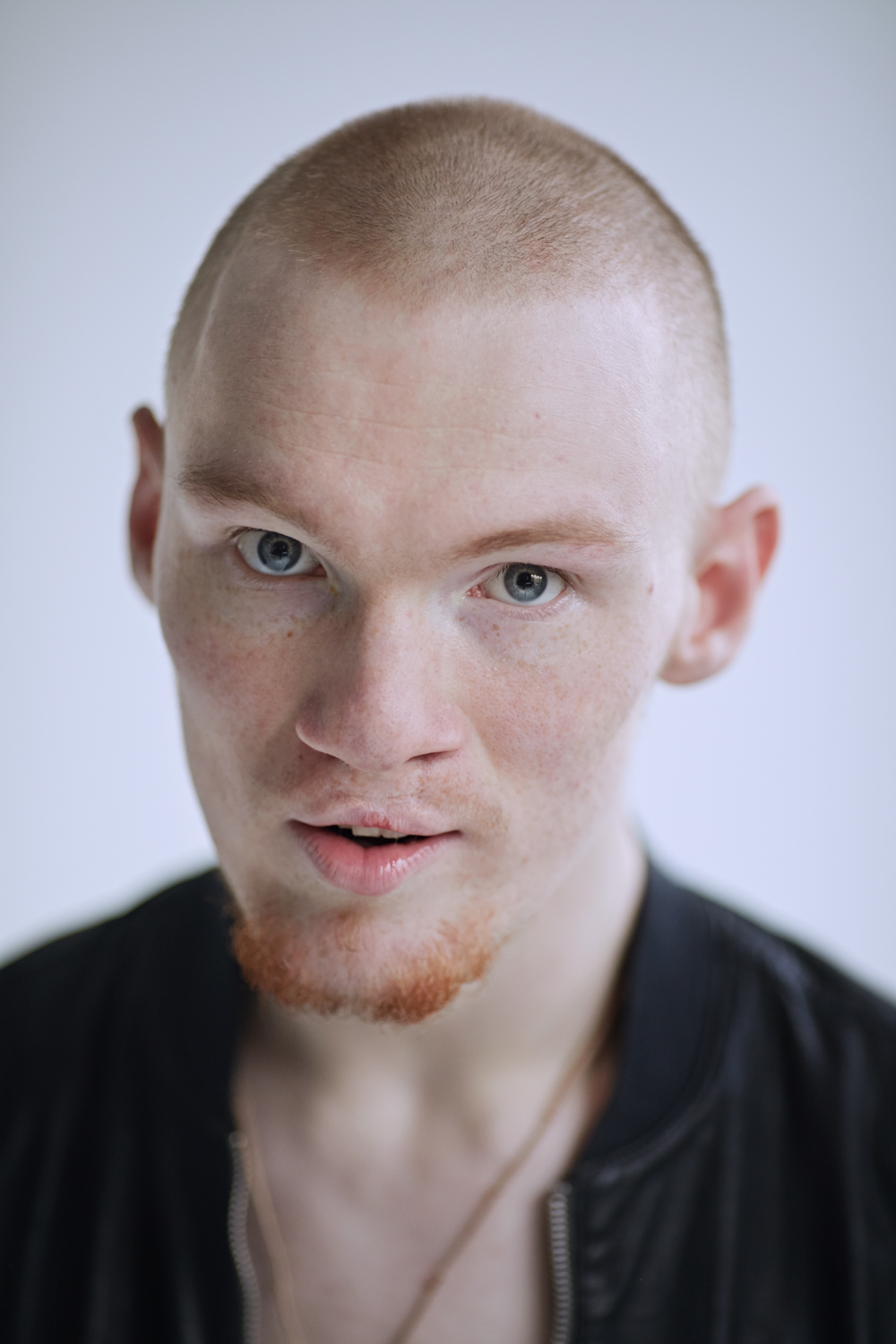
- Born: Saint Petersburg
- Website: ibakaidov.ru

Ivan Bakaidov (Russian: Ива́н Алекса́ндрович Бака́идов, born 6 October 1998, Sankt-Peterburg, Russia) is a disabled Russian accessibility software developer, motivational speaker and blogger. He is affected with cerebral palsy, which deprived him of articulate speech and, to a degree, of voluntary control of movement, n him wheelchair-bound. During his study at a school for children with special needs he learnt coding and decided to use it to help himself and other people with such health issues communicate with general audience through computer systems he created. He has chosen independent assisted living after graduation and has been making public presentations of his work and lifestyle to demonstrate the possibilities of an even severely disabled person and the novel computer interaction systems for people with special health needs.

== Biography ==
Bakaidov was born in 1998 in St. Petersburg, Russia.

2017 - presented his developments at the UN summit in Istanbul.

2018 - nominee for the UN World Summit Awards.

2019 - included in the list of 50 most famous people of St. Petersburg.

2020 - included in the list of nominees for the thirty most promising Russians under 30 years of age by Forbes.

Bakaidov is developer of a group of applications for people with speech impairments LINKa.
