= Crowdsource (app) =

Crowdsourcing platform developed by Google

- Developer: Google
- Release: August 29, 2016; 9 years ago
- Stable release: 2.35 (Build 938361853) / June 26, 2026; 8 days ago
- Operating system: Android 7+; Web; Discontinued: Android 5, 6 (2026); Android KitKat (2021); Android Jelly Bean (2020); Android Ice Cream Sandwich (2019)
- Size: 28 MB
- Type: Crowdsourcing platform
- Website: crowdsource.google.com

Crowdsource is a crowdsourcing platform developed by Google intended to improve a host of Google services through the user-facing training of different algorithms.

Crowdsource was released for the Android operating system on the Google Play store on August 29, 2016, and is also available on the web. Crowdsource includes a variety of short tasks users can complete to improve many of Google's different services. Such tasks include image label verification, sentiment evaluation, and translation validation. By completing these tasks, users provide Google with data to improve services such as Google Maps, Google Translate, and Android. As users complete tasks, they earn achievements including stats, badges, and certificates, which track their progress.

Crowdsource was released quietly on the Google Play store, with no marketing from Google. It received mixed reviews on release, with many reviews stating that its lack of monetary rewards is unusual, as similar platforms, such as Google Opinion Rewards, often reward users with Play credits.

== Features ==
Crowdsource includes different types of tasks, and these each provide Google with different information that it can give as training data to its machine learning algorithms. In the app's description on Google Play, Google refers to these tasks as "microtasks" which should take "no more than 5-10 seconds" to complete.

=== Tasks ===
Upon launch, the Crowdsource Android application presented users with 5 different tasks: image transcription, handwriting recognition, translation, translation validation, and map translation validation. The most recent version of the app includes 11 tasks: Image Label Verification, Sentiment Evaluation, Audio Validation, Smart Camera, Glide Type, Handwriting Recognition, Reading Charts, Trust in Charts, Translation, Translation Validation, and Image Capture.

==== Translation and translation validation ====
Translation related tasks (translation and translation validation) are only shown to users who have selected more than one language they are fluent in. While Maps Translation validation is no longer a task in the Crowdsource Android and web apps, users can still complete translation and translation validation tasks. Translation presents the user with one of the languages they listed themselves as fluent in, and asks them to translate it into another language they are fluent in. Translation validation presents users with a list of translations submitted by other users, and asks them to categorize them as correct or incorrect. Both of these tasks help improve Google's translating capabilities, most notably in Google Translate, and any other Google app with translated content, including Google Maps.

==== Image Label Verification ====
Image Label Verification allows users to select a word from a list of topics, such as "Cars, and then presents the user with a picture, asking the question "Does this image contain cars?". Users can select "Yes", "No", or "Skip" if they are unsure. The data gained from this task is used to help read text within images for services like Google Street View.

A similar task is available in the Google Photos mobile and web apps. However, unlike Crowdsource, the photos that are presented there are the user's own photos.

==== Handwriting recognition ====
Handwriting recognition relies on users to read handwritten words and transcribe them to text. According to Google, completing this task helps improve Gboard's handwriting feature.

==== Sentiment evaluation ====
Sentiment evaluation presents the user with various reviews and comments, and asks them to describe the statement as "positive", "neutral", or "negative". Alternatively, users can skip a question if they are unsure. These evaluations by the users of Crowdsource help with various recommendation-based technologies that Google uses on platforms like Google Maps, the Google Play Store, and YouTube.

==== Landmark identification ====
This task asks users to confirm if a specific landmark is visible in pictures shown in the app. This task is designed to help ensure businesses and landmarks are recognizable in applications such as Google Maps. This task is now complete and no longer available.

==== Audio Validation ====
Audio Validation helps improve Google's Text-to-Speech technology. The user is presented with a short audio clip in which a computer tries to read a word out loud. The user can then specify whether this is how said word would be correctly pronounced.

==== Image Caption ====
This task helps improve an algorithm to create captions for online images. According to the Google Crowdsource web app, "Verifying machine generated captions will help make images more accessible to people with visual and cognitive impairment".

==== Image Capture and Smart Camera ====
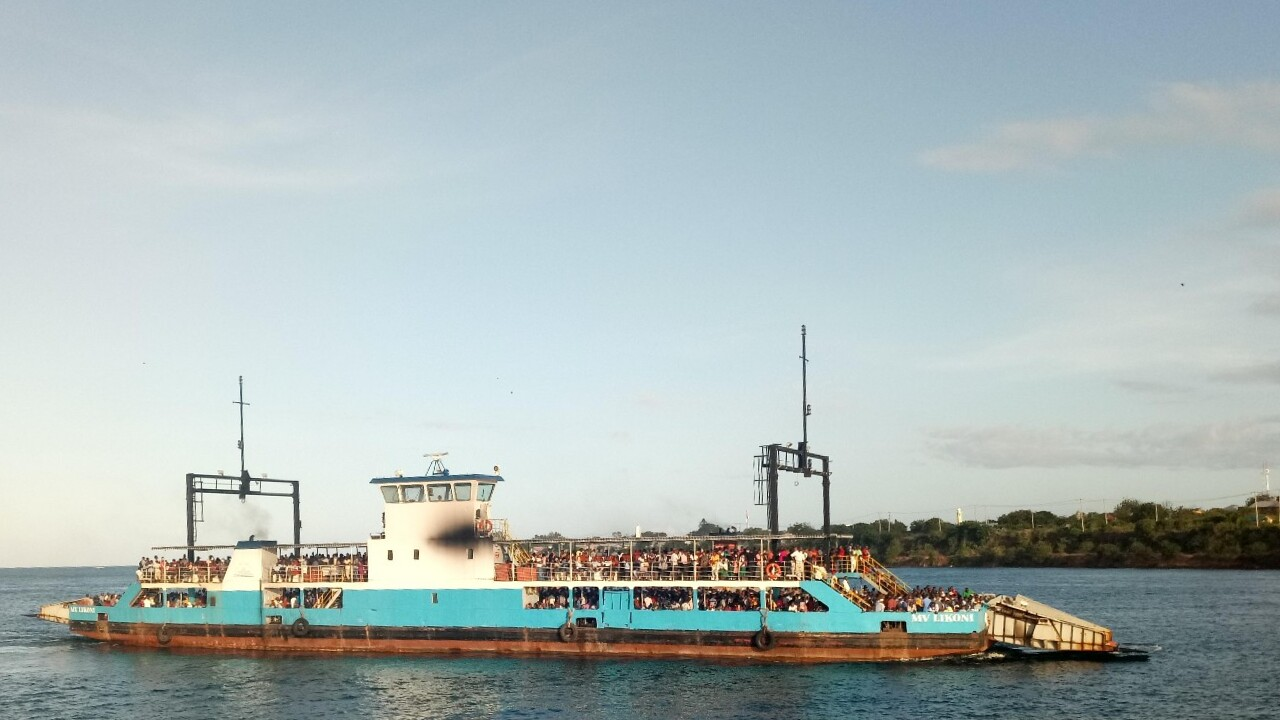
Contributed via Crowdsource, this Likoni Ferry picture now illustrates several Wikipedia articles.

When working on the Image Capture task, the user is presented with an interface to upload an image and add tags to it.

When using Smart Camera, the user can point the devices camera to an object, similar to how Google Lens is used. A dialogue opens when an item is detected. The app then says what it thinks it sees. The user can then confirm or deny this description. If the user confirms, the photo will be uploaded and you return to the beginning. If the user denies, an option to select why you denied and a place to add tags to the image pops up.

==== Glide Type ====
This task was added on May 17, 2020, to help improve the algorithm for Gboard's glide typing feature.

==== Reading and Trust in Charts ====
These two tasks were also added on May 17, 2020, as a collaboration with King's College and University of Vienna to measure the community's understanding and trustworthiness of different graph types. The task was completed the next day, May 18th, and closed.

=== Achievements ===
Beyond the tasks that users can complete, the Crowdsource app has an "Achievements" section that shows users stats and badges which they earn through completing different tasks in Crowdsource.

==== Stats ====
When users contribute to Crowdsource by completing tasks, Crowdsource tracks their total number of contributions, as well as metrics like "upvotes" which show how many of a user's answers are "in agreement with answers from the Crowdsource community," and "accuracy" which shows what percentage of the user's answers have been accepted as correct.

==== Badges ====
As users complete tasks, they also receive badges. There are badges for each type of task, which track progress along that particular task (such as translation validation), as well as badges for other milestones, like completing a task while offline or completing a task given through a push notification.

=== Updates ===
An April 2018 update to Crowdsource included a new "Image Capture" task in which users can take photos, tag them, and upload them to Crowdsource. Users can choose to open-source their images, as well, to share them with researchers and developers not exclusive to Google. In an interview with Wired Magazine, Anurag Batra, a product manager at Google who leads the Crowdsource team, said that the data gained from users completing this image capture task could improve Google Images, Pixel Camera, and Google Lens. The latest update adds a 'back' button to change your previous response.

On January 21, 2021, an update introduced dark theme to the mobile app. This update also changed the overall user interface significantly. A new task, Audio Validation, was also added.

== Platforms ==
Crowdsource is also available as a web application. It offers many of the same tasks, such as Image Label Verification, translation, and translation validation, and includes a page for users to view their achievements, much like the Android application. Unlike the Android version, the Crowdsource website includes a task for validation image captions, and evaluating facial expressions. However, it does not have the sentiment evaluation, image capture, smart camera, and audio validation tasks available. As of March 18, 2021, The Crowdsource website also does not have dark theme.

== Reception ==
On release, many reviewers found the app's lack of monetary rewards unusual, due to the fact that Google has a similar app, Google Opinion Rewards, which offers Google Play store credits after completing short surveys. An August 2016 review from Android Pit noted that "this reliance on altruism [is] a little strange given that Google already has an app, Google Opinion Rewards, which has a financial incentive for user feedback. It works slightly differently, but I don't see why the same reward scheme could not be applied." The review also expressed concern with this model, citing that users would be less likely to complete these tasks without more substantial rewards, writing that Crowdsource is "banking on the kind nature of its users", and asking "How are users, who generally want everything free and without adverts, going to respond to this in the long-term? Why would they rate this app highly, when the results are so nebulous?" A review from Wired shared similar concerns, writing "while Google is being open about its motivations, it will be difficult for users to know what difference their contributions make."

On Crowdsource's FAQ page, Google addresses this question of "Will I get paid for my answers?", answering, "No. Crowdsource is a community effort – we rely on the goodwill of community members to help improve the quality of services such as Google Maps, Google Translate, and others, so that everybody in the world can benefit". In an August 2016 review, CNET noted that Google's statement in Crowdsource's description, "Every time you use it, you know that you've made the internet a better place for your community.", is not accurate, stating that Google does not offer free access to Google Maps and Google Translate data. A review from TechCrunch also noted that Crowdsource is "solely focused on helping Google improve its own services," contrasting it with Amazon Mechanical Turk, which focuses on tasks from third parties.

== Applications ==
An April 2018 interview in Wired stated that Google's machine learning algorithms work best in the United States and Western Europe, but are less effective in less prosperous countries. In this interview Anurag Batra, a product manager at Google who leads the Crowdsource team, shared Google's motivations behind the Crowdsource app, stating that Google has "very sparse training data set from parts of the world that are not the United States and Western Europe," According to Wired, Google has a team that promotes the Crowdsource app in India and throughout Asia at colleges, and will likely expand to Latin America later in 2018. In a blog post on Local Guides Connect, Batra explains why Crowdsource is helpful to Google, detailing that the questions that Crowdsource asks users are designed to collect better samples of data to feed their machine learning algorithms.

Google uses the answers provided by users of Crowdsource, and validates them by showing them anonymously to other Crowdsource users. According to Google, once answers are validated, they are used to "train computer algorithms that run services such as Translate, Maps, Gboard, and others."

A brief on Cio Dive stated that an "accurate data set is critical" to the success of new technologies such as voice assistants and autonomous vehicles. The brief also notes that companies like Google and IBM are well positioned in the fields of artificial intelligence and machine learning due to the volume of data available to them to train and develop advanced artificial intelligence.

== See also ==
- Amazon Mechanical Turk
- Google Opinion Rewards
- Common Voice
