= Literata =

Serif typeface

- Category: Serif
- Designers: Veronika Burian and José Scaglione (Latin), Vera Evstafieva and Kiril Zlatkov (Cyrillic), Irene Vlachou and Gerry Leonidas (Greek)
- Commissioned by: Google
- Foundry: TypeTogether
- Date released: 2015
- Characters: 1,100+
- License: SIL Open Font License (since 2.1)
- Website: www.type-together.com/literata
- Latest release version: 3.103
- Latest release date: 19 May 2023; 2 years ago

Literata is a serif typeface commissioned by Google and designed by the independent type foundry TypeTogether. It was released in 2015 and is the default font family in Google Play Books, since version 3.4.5. The typeface was inspired by Scotch Roman and old-style typefaces. It was intended to establish a unique visual identity for the Play Books app, suitable across a wide variety of screen sizes, resolutions, and rendering software.

Literata initially included two different weights (regular and bold) and corresponding upright italicised variations (no real italic). Version 2.1 named Literata Book added two different weights (Medium and SemiBold) and small caps, and made cap-height numerals the default.

It includes support for full extended Latin, Polytonic Greek, and Cyrillic scripts. Compared to Play Books' former default font Droid Serif, Literata has a lower x-height and higher ascenders.

On 7 December 2018, Literata was open-sourced under the SIL Open Font License and released on GitHub including the variable font version.

== See also ==
- Bookerly
