= Bookerly =

Serif typeface

- Category: Serif
- Foundry: Dalton Maag
- Date released: 2015
- License: Corporate typeface

Bookerly is a serif typeface designed by Dalton Maag for Amazon's Kindle e-reader devices and apps. Combined with a new typesetting engine, Amazon.com asserts that the font helps the user "read faster with less eyestrain." The font includes ligatures and kerning pairs.

Bookerly replaced Caecilia as the default font for the 2015 Kindle Paperwhite (3rd generation) and it has been used as the default font on Amazon's following e-readers. The Bookerly font was added to many of the older Kindle devices via firmware updates, and it is also available at Amazon's Developer site.

== See also ==
- Athelas
- Literata
- New York (2019 typeface)
