= Digital Unlocked =

Google-sponsored training for businesses in India

Digital Unlocked is an initiative by Google in collaboration with the Indian School of Business and Ministry of Electronics and Information Technology to promote digital awareness and to help small scale businesses and startups to go digital in India. It was announced and launched by Google's CEO Sundar Pichai during his visit to India in January 2017. Digital Unlocked is a training program for small and medium-size businesses in India to start using the Internet to expand their business. The programme is built across the different formats of online, offline and mobile. The Digital Unlocked's offline training is being conducted in partnership with Federation of Indian Chambers of Commerce & Industry and Indian School of Business.

The training program allows the users to set their own goals and then recommends the courses which will help them achieve their own set goals. After completing the goals, or in-between, the users can also choose to complete and learn other courses which are of interest to them. The courses cover a wide range of topics from using the opportunities which the digital media and world have to offer to the advanced tools which can help businesses in many ways. The training program also offer a Certification to those who complete all the courses and qualify in the final assessment.

== Topics ==
Following are the topics which are covered in the program.

The online opportunity
Your first steps in online success
Build your web presence
Connect through email
Get started with search
Get discovered with search
Make search work for you
Be noticed with search ads
Improve your search campaigns
Get started with analytics
Find success with analytics
Get noticed locally
Help people nearby find you online
Get noticed with social media
Deep dive into social media
Discover the possibilities of mobile
Make mobile work for you
Advertise on other websites
Deep dive into display advertising
Expand internationally
Make the most of video
Build your online shop
Sell google
Plan your online business strategy
Get started with content marketing
Turn data into insights

== See also ==
- List of Google tools and services
- Google Primer
- Digital India
- Google Ads
