= My Tracks =

GPS tracking application

- My Tracks 2.0 Logo

- Screenshot
- Original author: Google
- Developer: Google
- Release: 12 February 2009
- Final release: 2.0.11 / 21 January 2016; 10 years ago
- Preview release: 2.0.2.rc6
- Written in: Java, XML (content language)
- Operating system: Android 1.5+
- Size: Varies with device
- License: Apache License, Version 2.0
- Website: www.google.com/mobile/mytracks/
- Repository: code.google.com/p/mytracks/

My Tracks was a Global Positioning System (GPS) tracking application that ran on Android. The application used a device's GPS capabilities to collect data, allowing real-time review of path, speed, distance, and elevation. Later, this data could be saved to Google Maps, Google Fusion Tables, or Google Docs and shared with Google+, Facebook, or Twitter. The application also allowed a user to record annotations along the path, hear periodic voice announcements of progress, and sync with select third-party bio-metric sensors.

In 2016, Google announced that My Tracks would be deprecated and no longer available in the Google Play Store. An in-app popup alerted users that My Tracks would stop working on April 30, 2016;

== History ==
The application made its debut on February 12, 2009 under a closed license. A year later on March 28, 2010, Google announced the open-sourcing of the application, stating that "The collective intelligence of the development community will create a more powerful, more intuitive, more useful, and more robust My Tracks." The first major re-haul of the application came on July 13, 2012 when Google released version 2.0. This introduced a new interface, support for playing back data in Google Earth for Android, improved charts, and additional statistics. In 2014 the developers announced on the google code project site that My Tracks would no longer developed in the open and that the source code would be removed. The last open source version was 2.0.5 released in August 2013.

== Reception ==
In September 2013, the Google Play Store listed the application as being installed on 10,000,000 – 50,000,000 devices, with an overall rating of 4.4/5 from over 80,000 reviews. CNET gave the application 4/5 stars, praising its "Chart, Statistics, and satellite playback" and ability to pause recordings but criticized it for an "unattractive interface" and lack of "athletic-specific features". PCWorld awarded MyTracks 5/5 stars, stating "this app is just about perfect. It is intuitive to use and very stable."

== Forks ==
OpenTracks is an open-source fork launched in 2019.

OpenTracks
- OpenTracks Logo
- Release: 19 September 2019.
- Stable release: v4.25.1 / 1 February 2026; 9 months ago
- Written in: Java, XML (content language)
- Operating system: Android 5.0+
- Platform: Android (operating system)
- License: Apache License, Version 2.0
- Website: opentracksapp.com
- Repository: https://codeberg.org/OpenTracksApp/OpenTracks
