= Google Surveys =

Business product by Google

- Developer: Google
- Release: March 29, 2012
- Operating system: Cross-platform (web-based application)
- Type: Statistics, Surveys
- Website: surveys.google.com

Google Surveys (previously known as Google Consumer Surveys) was a business tool developed by Google that aimed to simplify personalized market research. Released in 2012, Google announced in September 2022 that it would cease operations on November 1, 2022. This product was designed by Google as an alternative to internet pay walls for websites that publish content. The program was launched by several online publishers such as Pandora, AdWeek, and the New York Daily News. Google Surveys was part of the Google Marketing Platform.

== Model ==
Diagram of the model

Google Surveys offered a web interface for designing surveys and provided the audience to take them. The survey questions had to meet certain requirements regarding length and content.

Google received money from business customers such as market research firms and small businesses who create the surveys. In addition to the paid services, Google also offered a free survey for websites with predefined questions targeted at people visiting the website. Every time a user responded to a survey, the publishers would earn US$0.05.

From the consumer side, the surveys worked as a paywall (also called a "survey-wall") for websites offering premium content. Users visiting these websites had the option of responding to a survey to access content for free.

Google Surveys utilized inferred demographics to balance its sample, gauging respondent demographics based on their past web browsing activity.

== History ==
The product was launched on March 29, 2012.

On February 19, 2015, Google announced Consumer Surveys as a platform for publishers to monetize their online content. Initially, this platform was available only for publishers from the US, UK and Canada. Publishers' payments were made through the AdSense payment system, but the platform had its own management and reporting console.

On October 19, 2016, Google announced that it had renamed the product from Google Consumer Surveys to Google Surveys and was moving it to part of the Google Analytics product suite.

In September 2022, Google announced that Google Surveys would close on November 1, 2022.

== Reception ==
Google Surveys results page

Notable uses of Google Surveys included voter information tools and behavior surveys of holiday travelers. Google Surveys published voter opinion polls leading up to the 2012 US presidential elections. According to New York Times' blogger and statistician Nate Silver, the Google Surveys' election polls were ranked second in terms of reliability and lack of bias in predicting election results for the 2012 presidential election. However, it was the worst performing pollster for the 2016 presidential election.

Pew Research Center conducted a series of tests to evaluate Google Surveys in consultation with Google. In November 2012, Pew independently published an analysis of the results up to that point, which stated in part that a "comparison of several demographic questions asked by Pew Research indicates that the Google Consumer Surveys sample appears to conform closely to the demographic composition of the overall internet population".

Google Surveys has been compared to SurveyMonkey (which also offers both a survey creation interface and a way to purchase an audience), where it was praised for its low cost per response but was found to have less flexibility in designing the survey.

Google also reviewed Google Surveys in a white paper, concluding that "Google Consumer Surveys can be used in place of more traditional Internet-based panels without sacrificing accuracy" while also stating that "since Google Consumer Surveys only allows one-question or screening two-question surveys, analysis of the relationships between survey questions are difficult or sometimes not even possible".

== See also ==
- Comparison of survey software
- Survata
- Jotform
