= Intrusive research =

Gathering of data from individuals

Intrusive research is the gathering of data from individuals through interviewing, observation, or surveying, when consent is legally required, yet the test subjects don't have the capacity to give such consent due to mental illness or developmental disability. It is a legal issue addressed by the United Kingdom Mental Capacity Act 2005.

== Intrusive research and UK's Mental Capacity Act ==
UK's Mental Capacity Act 2005 criminalizes intrusive research if it was carried out without securing the consent of the person involved, who has the mental capacity to make the decision. It is also unlawful to involve a person lacking mental capacity without the approval of an "appropriate body". The appropriate body pertains to the authority appointed by the Secretary of State in England and the National Assembly for Wales (e.g. Research Ethics Committee). The Act also applies to non-interventional research such as observational research. The law provides the statutory framework and provisions for the participation of people without the capacity to give consent in intrusive research.

The Act also applies to clinical trials of treatments and procedures, but doesn't apply to trials of medicinal products, for which there is a separate regulation (The Medicines for Human Use Regulations, 2004).

The Mental capacity Act code of practice, 2007, gives examples of intrusive research:

- Clinical research into new types of treatments (except clinical trials of medicines that are covered by separate regulations)
- Health or social care services research to evaluate the effectiveness of a policy intervention or service innovation.
- Research in other fields, (e.g. criminal justice, psychological studies, lifestyle or socioeconomic surveys)
- Research on tissue samples (i.e. tissue removed during surgical or diagnostic procedures)
- Research on health and other personal data collected from records.
- Observations, photography or videoing of humans.

== Other usage ==
A broader conceptualization defines intrusive research as a method of data gathering that entails the participation of the investigator as opposed to non-participant observation. It includes various types of interviews such as structured interview and in-depth interview.

== See also ==
- Regulation of science
- Scientific ethics
