= Google Family Link =

Family parental controls service

- Developer: Google
- Release: March 2017; 9 years ago

Stable release(s) [±]
- Android: 2.95 (Build 2026w31.954585963) / July 27, 2026; 3 months ago
- iOS (Note: Including iPadOS): 2.95 (Build 44751) / August 3, 2026; 3 months ago
- Operating system: Android 7+; iOS 17+
- Included with: Android 10 and above
- Available in: Available in 38 languages
- Type: Parental controls
- License: Proprietary freeware
- Website: families.google/familylink/

Google Family Link is a family parental controls service by Google that allows parents to adjust parameters for their children's devices. The application allows parents to restrict content, approve or disapprove apps, set screen times, and more. Google Family Link requires a Google Account in order to access the app remotely.

== History ==
The service was first released to the public in March 2017. At Google I/O 2019, Google announced that it would include Family Link natively in Android 10. Family Link is now available in 38 countries including the United States, Nigeria, Australia, and Japan.

In 2019, the app added content restricting, GPS locating, and "bedtime" phone restriction features.

== Features ==
Google Family Link Child and Teen Logo - new

Google Family Link Child and Teen Logo - old

The Family Link service is split into two different applications, Family Link for Parents and Family Link for Children & Teens. The Family Link for Parents app allows parents to use customizable parameters in order to manage their kids' content viewing. For children & teenagers, the Family Link for Children & Teens app allows the parameters instructed by the parents to manage the kids' mobile device.

Some Family Link features include restricting various content such as websites and applications, managing screen times, locating phones via GPS, and downloading apps from the Play Store.

Another feature available in Family Link is being able to restrict launching pre-installed applications on devices. These include Google Assistant, Google Drive, YouTube, social media platforms such as Facebook and Twitter, and more.

== Reception ==
Andrew Williams of TechRadar shows in one of his blog posts that the Family Link service "gives you great insights into how your children are using their devices and potentially the content they see on them too".

Ashley Carmen of The Verge shows in one of her blog posts that she is "slightly wary of building a Google data profile of a young child".

== See also ==
- Microsoft family features
