= Toontastic 3D =

Educational software developed by Google

- Original author: LaunchPad Toys
- Developer: Google
- Release: 11 January 2017; 9 years ago as Toontastic in January 2011; 15 years ago
- Operating system: Android, iOS (deleted on the App Store)

Toontastic 3D was an interactive storytelling mobile app developed by Google, where kids can draw, animate, narrate and record their own cartoons on their devices.

Initially released as a 2D version in 2011, a 3D version was launched in January 2017. It allowed users to move characters around and position the characters in different parts without other features needing to be used.

== History ==
Toontastic was developed by Andy Russell and Thushan Amarasiriwardena for touchscreen devices. Toontastic was originally launched in January 2011 by LaunchPad Toys.

In February 2015, Google acquired LaunchPad Toys, Toontastic's developer.

In January 2017, Google rebranded the app as Toontastic 3D; the app was removed from iOS in 2022.
