= Read Along =

Android language-learning app

- Developer: Google
- Initial release: March 6, 2019; 6 years ago
- Stable release: 0.5.607317860 (Android) / February 19, 2024; 23 months ago
- Platform: Android, Android TV
- Type: Digital platform, Play Store, Web
- Website: readalong.google

Read Along, formerly known as Bolo, is an Android language-learning app for children developed by Google for the Android operating system. The application was released on the Play Store on March 7, 2019. It features a character named Diya helping children learn to read through illustrated stories. It has the facility to learn English and Indian major languages i.e. Hindi, Bengali, Tamil, Telugu, Marathi and Urdu, as well as Spanish, Portuguese and Arabic.

== Technology ==
The app uses text-to-speech technology, through which the character named Dia reads the story, as well as speech-to-text technology, which mechanically identifies the matches between the text and the reading of the user. The story of Chhota Bheem and Katha Kids was added in September 2019. In April 2020, a new version of the application was released. In September 2020, it added Arabic language to its language option. A web version was launched in August 2022.
