= Google Affiliate Network =

Affiliate marketing company

- Company type: Public
- Industry: Affiliate marketing
- Founded: Chicago, Illinois (1998) as Dynamic Trade
- Headquarters: Mountain View, California
- Products: Affiliate network
- Website: Official Webpage

The Google Affiliate Network was the affiliate marketing company, specifically affiliate network, formerly known as Doubleclick Performics, which was bought by Google in 2007. On April 16, 2013, Google announced the closure of the Google Affiliate Network.

== History ==
- DoubleClick announced the acquisition of DoubleClick (including Performics) by Google for $3.1 Billion in April 2007. The acquisition was finalized in March 2008 after the approval of the Department of Justice antitrust authorities in the United States and the Brussels-based European Commission, the antitrust authority of the European Union.
- The search engine marketing and optimization part of Performics was acquired by Publicis in 2008, after the purchase of DoubleClick by Google (NASDAQ: GOOG) had been finalized. The affiliate network part of DoubleClick Performics remained with Google and was re-branded Google Affiliate Network.
- On April 17, 2013, Google announced plans to retire the Google Affiliate Network on July 31, 2013.

== See also ==
- Affiliate marketing
- Affiliate programs directories
- Affiliate network
