= Google Clips =

Clip-on automatic video camera

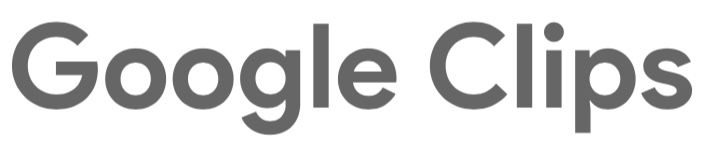
- Developer: Google
- Manufacturer: Google
- Type: Camera
- Released: October 4, 2017; 8 years ago (United States)
- Storage: 16 GB
- Camera: 1.55μm pixels, autofocus
- Connectivity: Wi-Fi Direct, Bluetooth LE
- Dimensions: Without clip: H: 49 mm (1.9 in); W: 49 mm (1.9 in); D: 20 mm (0.79 in); With clip: H: 54 mm (2.1 in); W: 54 mm (2.1 in); D: 36 mm (1.4 in)
- Weight: Without clip: 42.2 g (0.09 lb); With clip: 60.5 g (0.13 lb)
- Website: store.google.com/product/google_clips

Google Clips is a discontinued miniature clip-on camera device developed by Google.

== History ==
It was announced on October 4, 2017 and went on sale on January 27, 2018. Google Clips automatically captured video clips (without audio) at moments its machine learning algorithms determined to be interesting or relevant. An indicator flashed when the camera was looking for scenes to capture.

Google Clips' artificial intelligence (AI) could learn the faces of people to take photographs with certain people, and could automatically set lighting and framing.

It had 16 GB of storage built-in storage and could record clips for up to 3 hours.

This camera was originally priced at US$249 in the United States. It was withdrawn from sale on October 15, 2019, but supported until the end of December 2021.

== Reception ==
The Independent wrote that Google Clips is "an impressive little device, but one that also has the potential to feel very creepy."

According to The Verge's generally negative review, "it didn't capture anything special" over two weeks of testing.
