= Google Gesture Search =

Discontinued application for Android 2.0 and above

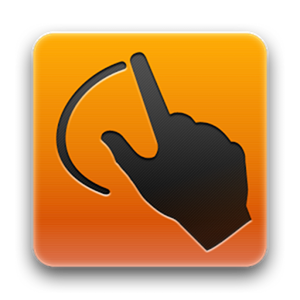

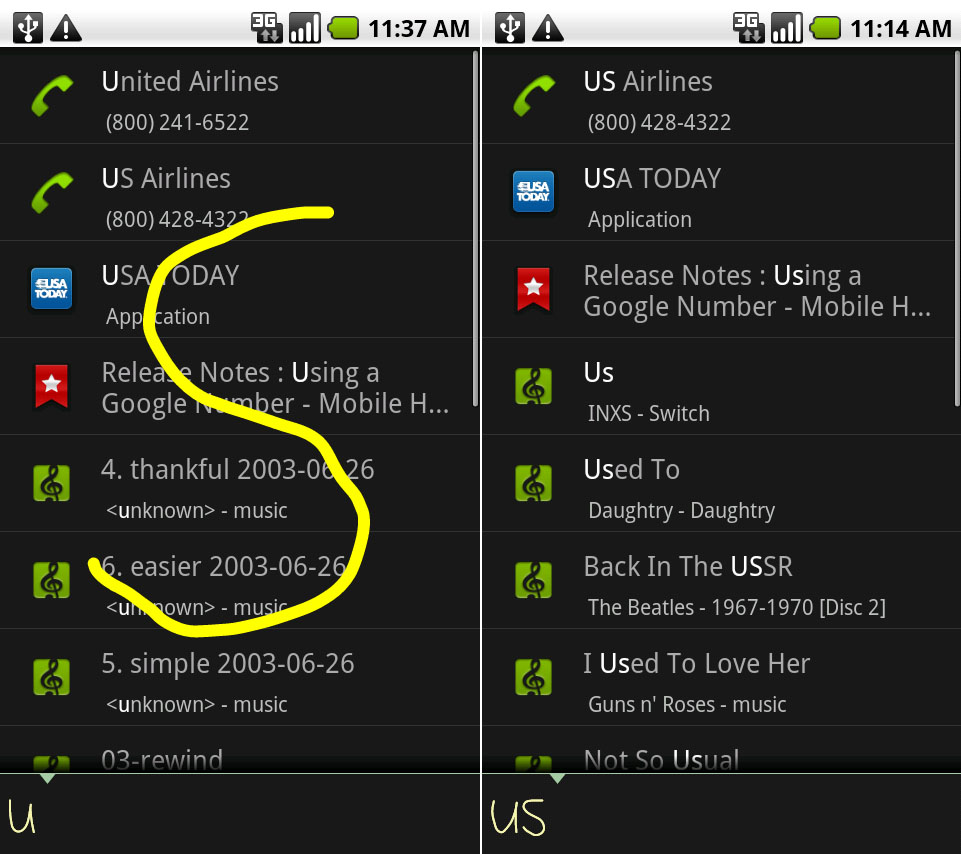
- Screenshots of what Google Gesture Search looks like in action on a mobile device (Android smartphone).
- Developer: Google
- Initial release: March 3, 2010; 15 years ago
- Operating system: Android

Google Gesture Search was released on March 3, 2010 as a new application for the Android Eclair operating system (Android 2.0) and above, which enabled users to search their phone's contacts, bookmarks, applications and music simply by scribbling out letters with their finger.

== Release ==
Gesture Search was based on the early research work and primarily developed by Yang Li, a Research Scientist at Google. At the time of its launch, the application was made available only to the elite devices such as the Google Nexus One & the Motorola Milestone and was regarded as an extension to Google's handwriting recognition programme, prominently available only in the US. In order to be able to access the Gesture Search, one had to first launch the application and then proceed with actions / scribblings as required; as opposed to the modern Google Search which tends to be universally available (without having to trigger the Search application).

== Notable updates ==
- On June 8, 2011, Google Labs enabled an API for Gesture Search that gave developers access to integrate the feature within their own Android apps as well where the users could gesture to write text and search for application-specific data.
- Google also updated Gesture Search for Android with support for over 40 languages and transliteration.
- Also, as reported on July 28, 2014, the Google Gesture Search v2.1.4 added a new widget on the Android Smartphone devices that allowed users to quickly launch recently used applications, while this was shown as a pop-up on Android Tablets.
- The product was discontinued in 2017.
