= Google Primer =

Business-training mobile app by Google

Google Primer was a free mobile application by Google, designed to teach digital marketing and business skills to small and medium business owners, startups, and job seekers using 5-minute interactive lessons. It was a part of Google's Grow with Google and Digital Unlocked initiatives.

Primer officially debuted in the United States on September 15, 2015, and was previously available in Latin America, Indonesia, India, Canada, and Australia. On May 17, 2018, Google Primer underwent a redesign to make it more accessible to all users and to provide new lesson content on accessibility.

As of 2023 the Google Primer app has been discontinued and removed from the app stores, and the URL for the app's former website, yourprimer.com, now redirects to the Grow With Google website homepage. No official announcement about the app's removal was made.

== See also ==
- List of Google tools and services
- Digital Unlocked
