= Google Play Books =

Digital distribution service for ebooks

- Developer: Google
- Release: December 6, 2010; 15 years ago (as Google eBooks)

Stable release(s) [±]
- Android: 2026.5.29.2 (Build 367111) / June 15, 2026; 4 months ago
- iOS (Note: Including iPadOS): 26.522 / June 9, 2026; 5 months ago
- Operating system: Android 7+; iOS 18+; web
- Type: Digital distribution
- Website: play.google.com/books

Google Play Books, formerly Google eBooks, is an ebook digital distribution service operated by Google, part of its Google Play product line. Users can purchase and download ebooks and audiobooks from Google Play, which offers over five million titles, with Google claiming it to be the "largest ebooks collection in the world". Books can be read on a dedicated Books section on the Google Play website, through the use of a mobile app available for Android and iOS, through the use of select e-readers that offer support for Adobe Digital Editions, through a web browser and reading via Google Home. Users may also upload up to 2,000 ebooks in the PDF or EPUB file formats. Google Play Books is available in 75 countries.

Google Play Books was launched in December 2010, with a reseller program letting independent booksellers sell Google ebooks on their websites for a cut of sales. It also launched an affiliate program in June 2011, allowing website owners to earn a commission by referring sales to the then-named Google eBookstore. However, the reseller program ended in April 2012, with Google stating that it had "not gained the traction that we hoped it would" and "not met the needs of many readers or booksellers". The affiliate program closed for new signups in February 2012, with Google announcing that it would scale down the initiative, making it private and invitation-only.

The mobile Android app has seen several significant updates since its introduction, including different reading modes with color contrasts, support for text highlighting and note-taking, a zoomed-out view with easy page sliding in an effort to improve reading experiences for books not read cover-to-cover, a vertical scrolling mode for comic books, a "Night Light" feature that gradually filters blue light to reduce eye strain after sunset, using machine learning imaging technologies to expand speech bubbles in comics, and listening to audiobooks.

As the Play Books store had been noted to hold much pirated content, Google discontinued new sign-ups to its publisher program in 2015. The program was reopened only in 2018 when it incorporated an automated process to decline books found to contain extensive text copied from other books already in the store.

== History ==
The history of Google Play Books can be traced to the Google eBooks service offered by Google before the Google Play brand came into existence. The Google eBookstore was launched on December 6, 2010, with more than three million titles available, making it the "largest ebooks collection in the world". At the time of launch, the service was partnered with 100 independent booksellers, while the number of publishers was 5,000. This increased to 250 independent booksellers and 7,000 publishers in May 2011, along with three million free Google eBooks available in the United States, up from two million at launch. The service was codenamed Google Editions, the name under which it was widely assumed that the service would be launched. Google Books director Dan Clancy had talked about Google's vision to open an ebookstore for in-print books in an interview back in July 2009. Then-named TechHive reported in October 2009 that the service would be launched in the first half of 2010, before a Google employee told the media in May that the launch would be in June or July. The actual launch, however, took place in December.

The store was headed by Dan Clancy, who also directed Google Books. Clancy stated that Google Editions would let publishers set the prices for their books and would accept the 'agency' model, as that of the publisher being considered the seller with the online vendor acting as an 'agent'. Clancy also stressed that Google's ebooks would be readable on any device, indicating the open nature of the platform. It would also make ebooks available for bookstores to sell, giving "the vast majority" of revenues to the store. Having already digitized 12 million physical books at the time, including out-of-print titles, Google offered a "far greater" selection than Amazon and Apple did.

In June 2011, Google introduced an affiliate program for ebooks, allowing websites to earn commissions by referring sales to the Google eBookstore. Google eBooks became listed on the Google Affiliate Network.

In March 2012, Google revamped all of its digital distribution services into a single platform called Google Play, with the Google eBookstore becoming Google Play Books.

In April 2012, Google announced that its reseller partner program would be discontinued by the end of January 2013.

In July 2013, Google made some changes to the publisher policy page for Google Play Books, removing mentions of book bundle pricing, and adding several mentions of ebook rentals. Google also dropped support for a wide variety of ebook file formats it used to accept, including DOC, XML, HTML, MOBI and PDB, to focus primarily on the EPUB format.

In early May 2015, Google announced that a new custom-made typeface called Literata would be used for Google Play Books.

Towards the end of the month, Google announced that it was temporarily closing its Books Partner Center for new signups, stating that it was to "improve our content management capabilities and our user experience." This was presumably in response to the observations of extensive piracy on the ebookstore reported by The Digital Reader. However, it continued to remain closed for a long time, leading The Digital Reader to speculate that the closure would be permanent, commenting that "Google has only a minimal interest in ebooks." During this time, the only way authors and publishers could get their content on to the store was through aggregators, such as PublishDrive, ebookpartnership and StreetLib.

In September 2015, Google acquired Oyster, a subscription-based ebook service. As a part of the acquisition, Oyster shut down its existing service in early 2016, and its founders joined Google Play Books in New York.

In January 2018, Google began selling audiobooks that can be listened via the app.

In June 2018, Google reopened its publisher program to new sign-ups. To curb piracy, text of new books would now be compared with that of other books in the store.

=== Reseller program ===
At launch, Google had formed partnerships with independent booksellers, enabling them to sell Google ebooks on their websites for a cut of sales. Bookstore partners included Powell's, Alibris and participating members of the American Booksellers Association.

In a blog post in May 2011, Google announced that it had over 250 independent bookseller partners, compared to just over 100 at the time of launch.

In April 2012, Google decided to end the reseller program, stating that the program "has not gained the traction that we hoped it would" and that "it's clear that the reseller program has not met the needs of many readers or booksellers". The program was discontinued at the end of January 2013. As noted by Publishers Weekly, the service "sought to bring independent retailers into the digital retailing", by giving local bookstores a fee from each title purchased by consumers, but local stores were required to do their own marketing and promotion, something that "many stores simply did not have the resources to do". Seen as a "big blow for small bookstores seeking to compete against Amazon and Barnes & Noble", the move attracted severe criticism from the industry. In a letter to its members, the American Booksellers Association said that it was "very disappointed" in Google's decision while noting that the change could be "disconcerting and disruptive" for booksellers. "As an enormous, multinational corporation, Google has interests far beyond independent bookstores, and the book world at large, and, at times, it has lacked understanding of many basic principles of our industry", the letter said.

=== Affiliate program ===
In June 2011, Google launched an affiliate program for Google eBooks, allowing website owners to earn a commission by referring sales to the Google eBookstore. Google had previously tested the program as a limited beta in December 2010 with Goodreads. Becoming an affiliate was described by Gigaom as a three-step process: users first had to sign up for an AdSense account and be approved, then join the Google Affiliate Network and be approved, and then sign up as an affiliate for ebooks. Website owners could earn between 6-10% of a book's selling price, depending on the number of book sales through affiliate referrals.

In February 2012, Google announced its decision to scale down the affiliate program, turning it into a private initiative and removing most of the affiliates. Google eBooks would no longer be listed as an advertiser on the Google Affiliate Network. Google had previously stopped accepting new applications for becoming an affiliate more than two weeks prior to the announcement.

Those who were delinked from the program received commissions for sales up to March 15, 2012. Google said that it would continue to add affiliates, but only on an invitation-basis. In a mistake, Google also notified independent booksellers that their affiliate status would expire, but later clarified that it did not intend to remove independent booksellers from the affiliate program, and said that it was "working to reinstate those who were mistakenly notified."

=== Piracy ===
In May 2015, The Digital Reader reported its findings of extensive piracy prevailing on the Play Books store. Website writer Nate Hoffelder noted that there were several e-book pirates selling non-authentic copies of e-books at reduced prices. They were of inferior quality, with "missing formatting, generic or outdated covers, and other problems". One day later, The Digital Reader reported that Google had removed the pirated book listings in response to the article, but deemed it far from enough.

== Platforms ==
Books purchased can be read on a dedicated Books section of the Google Play website, through the mobile app available for Android and iOS devices, and through the use of a Google Chrome web browser app. Offline download and reading is supported on the mobile apps and through the Chrome web browser app.

=== Mobile app feature ===
Sample of the Literata typeface used for Google Play Books

At launch, introductory features included customizations such as selecting a font, font size, line spacing, and day/night reading modes, and the ability to pick up reading positions while using multiple devices. On Android, the app's home screen shows recently opened books, as well as book recommendations and books +1'd by friends. The "My Library" section shows all the books grouped into three categories: "Purchases", "Samples" and "Uploads". Books can be "kept on device" for offline reading. Play Books features a 3D page turning effect, with an option to turn it off. It also allows users to turn pages using the device's volume controls. The website interface does not support different reading modes or any page turning effect. Text can be read out loud using the device's text-to-speech engine or Google Text-to-Speech, with an option for a "High-quality voice" in settings, although the feature requires a data connection to stream the voice data.

In September 2012, Google Play Books on Android was updated to feature a new sepia reading mode, in addition to day and night modes; info cards for unknown written geographical locations and dictionary definitions; word or phrase translation; and support for highlighting text and writing notes. The sepia reading mode, text highlighting and note-taking features were eventually extended to the iOS app in August 2013.

In May 2013, Play Books started allowing users to upload PDF and EPUB files for free through the Play Books website, with support for up to 1,000 files. The Android app was updated in December 2013 with support for uploading files.

In October 2014, Play Books was updated to allow users to tap the center of the screen to enter a "skim" mode, where the page zooms out to allow users to easily slide between pages, in an effort to improve the reading experience for books that are typically not read cover-to-cover, such as non-fiction, cookbooks and textbooks.

In November 2015, Play Books was updated with features aimed at comic book fans, with the update adding a new vertical scrolling experience for comics in landscape mode, and new curated pages and recommendations for comics, with options for organizing by issue and volume.

In December 2015, Play Books was updated to include a "Night Light" feature that "gradually filters blue light from your screen, replacing it with a warm, amber light as the sun sets". Google claims that Night Light "automatically adapts to the amount of natural sunlight outside based on the time of day, giving you just the right temperature and brightness".

In July 2016, Play Books was updated with "Bubble Zoom", a machine learning imaging feature that recognizes objects in comics and "expands the speech bubbles of a comic one-tap-at-a-time, making them super easy to read on your mobile device".

== Books on Google Play ==
The Google Play store serves as the primary source of ebooks for reading on Google Play Books. As of 2013, over five million titles are available.

Select books, mainly textbooks, are available for rental. The rental period starts as soon as the payment is completed, not when the book is opened. Google Play also allows users to pre-order ebooks to have the title delivered automatically as soon as it's made available.

=== File formats ===
Originally, Google allowed publishers and authors to upload books in a number of formats, including DOC, PDF, PDB, MOBI, EPUB, and HTML. But in July 2013, support for all these formats except for PDF and EPUB were dropped. As of 2017, Google accepts EPUB versions 2.0.1 and 3.0.1. Both text and image-based PDFs are accepted when the EPUB format is not available, with the preference being for PDFs with a text layer.

For reading on e-readers or third-party apps, some ebooks, but not all, can be downloaded in the EPUB ("flowing text") or PDF ("original pages") formats. Google states on its support pages that the advantage EPUB has over PDF is that it allows the book's text to adjust to different screen sizes, and offers smaller file sizes.

Publishers have the option to enable digital rights management (DRM) protection for the digital file download of ebooks. The DRM system used is the Adobe Content Server 4. E-readers are required to support Adobe Digital Editions, and Google notes on its support pages that "Books bought on Google Play won't work on Amazon Kindle devices."

=== Availability ===
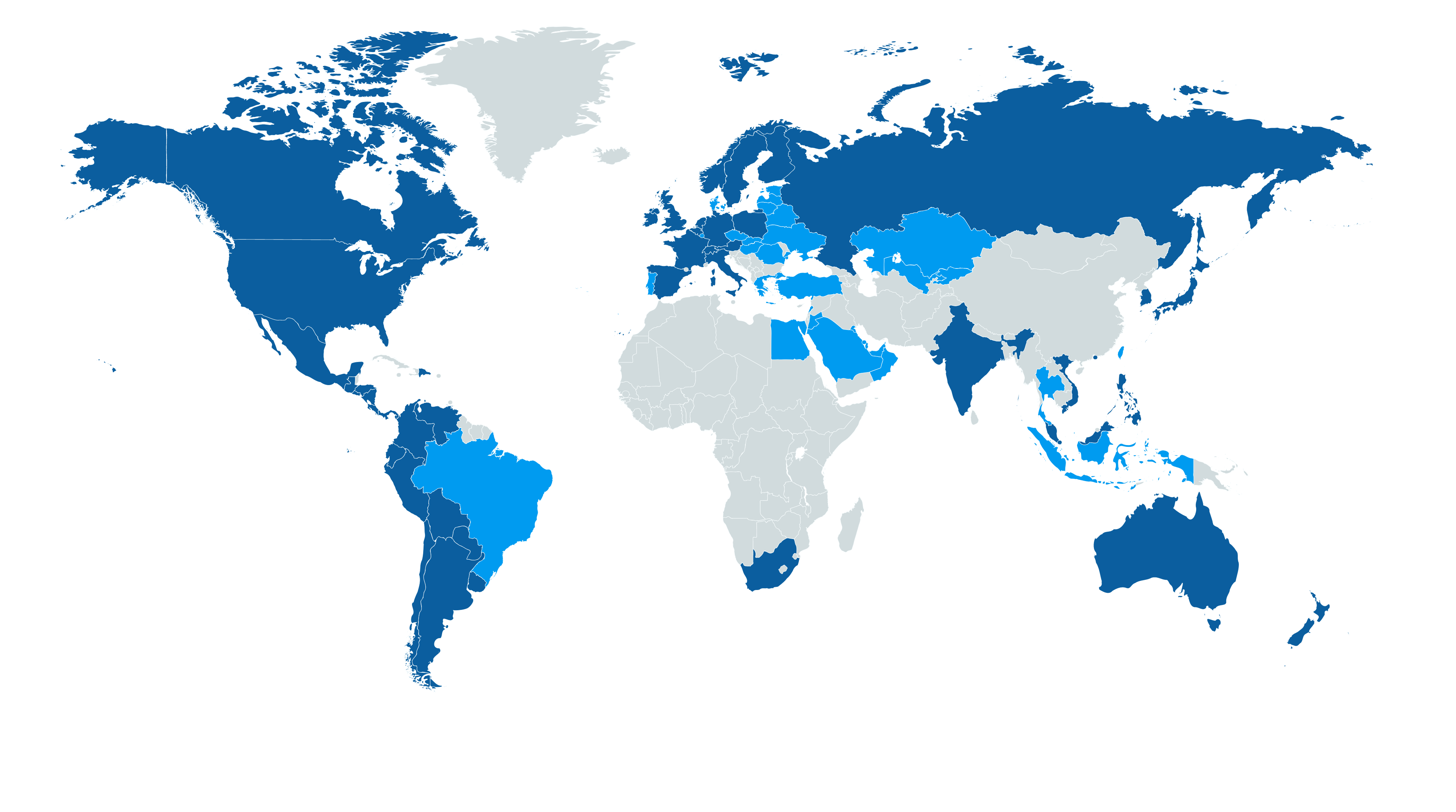
Global availability of Google Play Books

==== Nations where available ====
===== E-books =====
Argentina, Australia, Austria, Bahrain, Belarus, Belgium, Bolivia, Brazil, Canada, Chile, Colombia, Costa Rica, Czech Republic, Denmark, Dominican Republic, Ecuador, Egypt, El Salvador, Estonia, Finland, France, Germany, Greece, Guatemala, Honduras, Hong Kong, Hungary, India, Indonesia, Ireland, Italy, Japan, Jordan, Kazakhstan, Kuwait, Kyrgyzstan, Latvia, Lebanon, Lithuania, Luxembourg, Malaysia, Mexico, Netherlands, New Zealand, Nicaragua, Norway, Oman, Panama, Paraguay, Peru, Philippines, Poland, Portugal, Qatar, Romania, Russia, Saudi Arabia, Singapore, Slovakia, South Africa, South Korea, Spain, Sweden, Switzerland, Taiwan, Thailand, Turkey, Ukraine, United Arab Emirates, United Kingdom, United States, Uruguay, Uzbekistan, Venezuela, Vietnam.

===== Audiobooks =====
Argentina, Australia, Austria, Belgium, Bolivia, Brazil, Canada, Chile, Colombia, Costa Rica, Dominican Republic, Ecuador, El Salvador, Finland, France, Germany, Guatemala, Honduras, Hong Kong, India, Ireland, Italy, Japan, Malaysia, Mexico, Netherlands, Norway, New Zealand, Nicaragua, Panama, Paraguay, Peru, Philippines, Poland, Russia, South Africa, South Korea, Spain, Singapore, Sweden, Switzerland, United Kingdom, United States, Uruguay, Venezuela, Vietnam.

==== History of expansion ====
Google Play Books was launched Mexico in March 2013; Austria, Belgium, Ireland, and Portugal in June 2013; South Africa, Switzerland, and Turkey in November 2013; Argentina, Chile, Colombia, Peru, and Venezuela in December 2013; Belarus, Kazakhstan, Kyrgyzstan, and Uzbekistan in November 2014; Estonia, Latvia, Lithuania, and Ukraine in September 2014, and Bahrain, Egypt, Jordan, Kuwait, Lebanon, Oman, Qatar, Saudi Arabia, and United Arab Emirates in January 2016.

== Reception ==
In a December 2010 review, Laura Miller of Salon wrote that the public domain titles on the Google eBookstore were of a "lesser quality" than on competing services, writing that some titles "had obviously not been proofed and the scans of the original pages were difficult to read". Despite that, Miller found it interesting that public domain titles had functionality to view them either as a "scanned version - with the original type, page numbering and even library stamps and marginalia, basically photographs of the printed pages" and also as "searchable "flowing text", rendered by optical character recognition". Miller also wrote that the eBookstore was not easy to search, "an irony considering that the Google empire was built on search". She criticized the user interface for being "poor" and seemingly "devised by people who know next to nothing about the book trade". She praised Google's decision to incorporate reader reviews from Goodreads, writing that it "helps, as these are often more thoughtful than the average Amazon reader review", though again criticizing the "related books" section for bad suggestions. She also praised that Google had formed partnerships with independent bookstores, writing that it is "a great way to support neighborhood bookstores and it also allows Google eBookstore customers to partake of the expertise of people whose life's work is connecting readers with the right books."

In a May 2014 review, Riley Dennis of MakeUseOf wrote that "Google Play has been expanding its reach to all forms of media recently, and Play Books is one section that has noticeably improved and is now a genuine contender to the eReading competition". Dennis praised the ability to upload personal ebooks in addition to buying them, writing that it makes Play Books "a great universal eReader". Furthermore, he complimented the mobile Android app, writing that "Play Books is a delight to read on, from the refreshingly simple interface to the customizable and smooth reading experience", and that the page-turning animation was "delightful", "realistic" and "smooth". While writing about different forms of customization options available, he noted that "the margins can't be changed", and also criticized the website interface for lacking several features that were present in the mobile app. Dennis concluded his review by writing: "Play Books is a solid eReading app, but it still has room for growth."
