= Google Podcasts =

Podcast application (2018–2024)

- Screenshot Screenshot of Google Podcasts app on Android, in dark mode
- Developer: Google LLC
- Initial release: June 18, 2018; 7 years ago

Final release(s) [±]
- Android: 1.0.0.562912592
- iOS: 2.0.32
- Operating system: Android, iOS, Web
- Successor: YouTube Music
- Type: Podcast aggregator
- Website: podcasts.google.com (redirects to YouTube Music)

Google Podcasts was a podcast application developed by Google and released on June 18, 2018, for Android devices, and released on iOS devices on March 24, 2020.

On September 28, 2023, Google announced that it would shut down the service in the United States on April 2, 2024, with a migration path to YouTube Music. Outside the United States, it was shut down on June 24, 2024.

== History ==
The Google Podcasts app was first released for Android on June 18, 2018. A web-based player was spotted in March 2019 and became more widely available after Google added podcast features to search results in May 2019. In October 2019, the Android app received a redesign using Google Material Theme. The iOS version launched on March 24, 2020. In May 2020, Google announced that users could transfer their podcast subscriptions and history from Google Play Music to Google Podcasts.

In February 2023, Google podcast executives Kai Chuk and Steve McClendon announced that podcasts would be added to YouTube Music in the near future. In September, Google confirmed that the Google Podcasts app would be discontinued in 2024 in favor of YouTube Music. The app stopped functioning in the US on April 2, 2024, but still allowed users to export their subscriptions until July 30, 2024; the deadline for exporting podcast subscriptions was subsequently extended to August 30, 2024. It stopped functioning outside the US on June 24, 2024.
