= TalkBack =

Accessibility service for visually impaired Android users

Android Accessibility Suite
- Developer: Google
- Release: 2011; 15 years ago
- Stable release: 17.1 (Build 983118198) / September 17, 2026; 16 days ago
- Platform: Android 9+
- Size: ~3 MB
- Type: Accessibility

TalkBack is an accessibility service for the Android operating system that helps blind and visually impaired users to interact with their devices. It uses spoken words, vibration and other audible feedback to allow the user to know what is happening on the screen allowing the user to better interact with their device. The service is pre-installed on many Android devices, and it became part of the Android Accessibility Suite in 2017. According to the Google Play Store, the Android Accessibility Suite has been downloaded over five billion times, including devices that have the suite preinstalled.

== Open-source ==
Google releases the source code of TalkBack with some releases of the accessibility service to GitHub, with the latest of these changes being from March 23, 2026. The source for these versions of Google TalkBack have been released under the Apache License version 2.0.

== Release history ==
Version	Release date	Summary
12.1	September 2021	Introduced automatic captions for unlabeled images that contain text.
9.1	February 2021	New multi-finger gestures in a new context menu which can be used for activities such as reading, voice commands, support for Spanish and Arabic in the Braille keyboard, as well as a reorganization to the settings menu of TalkBack.
8.2	April 2020	Introduced a new Braille keyboard which uses six large buttons in screen in order to allow visually impaired users to type in a manner that may be more familiar to them.
7.3	March 2019	Added a screen search function to find text on screen in a more accessible manner and made changes to the continuous reading functionality of TalkBack by auto-scrolling pages and adding new navigation options.
7.2	November 2018	Improved controls and added fast forward and rewind functionality to the screen reader.
6.2	June 2018	Improved Android TV controls and Focus Management. This release came with the rebranding of TalkBack from an independent application into a part of the new Android Accessibility Suite, which includes TalkBack and a few other accessibility tools.
6.1	Early 2018	Added the ability for the active text to speech language to be changed through gestures, as well as fixing a variety of bugs such as making TalkBack not speak upon receiving a phone call until the user had touched the screen.
5.2	April 2017	Added a verbosity setting for speech, added audible feedback for zooming in and out, the ability to hear password character count in Chrome, as well as a variety of other fixes and improvements.
4.0	October 2011	Added TalkBack to Android system
