= Accessibility apps =

Software that aids disabled users of technology

Accessibility apps are mobile apps that increase the accessibility of a device or technology for individuals with disabilities. Applications, also known as application software, are programs that are designed for end users to be able to perform specific tasks. There are many different types of apps, some examples include, word processors, web browsers, media players, console games, photo editors, accounting applications and flight simulators. Accessibility generally refers to the design of products and environments to be usable by people with disabilities. Accessibility apps can also include making a current version of software or hardware more accessible by adding features. Accessibility apps aim to reduce barriers to technological goods and services, making them more usable for various groups within society. A basic example is that a person who experiences vision impairments is able to access technology through enabling voice recognition and text-to-speech software.

== History of accessible technology ==
Examples of accessible technology date back to the 17th century, French priest and mathematician Jean Leurechon first mentioned the instrument in his 1634 Recreations mathématiques. In 1808 Pellegrino Turri built one of the first typewriters to help a blind friend write. In 1829, Braille was invented by Louis Braille. In 1892, the first Braille typewriter was invented, which greatly helped to improve the writing ability of the visually impaired. In 1923 Harvey Fletcher built the Western Electric Model 2A hearing aid. In 1934 the first issue of talking books was released so that blind people could listen to books. In 1948, the transistor hearing aids came out with a smaller, more hidden feature. In 1953, under the efforts of Canadian inventor George Klein and his team, electric wheelchairs were created to provide great convenience for people with behavioral difficulties. 1975, Raymond Kurzweil pioneered educational tools for the visually impaired by founding Kurzweil Computer Products Inc. to develop the first OCR program capable of recognizing any print style. In 1995 Microsoft built accessibility features into Windows 95 instead of previously having to purchase an accessibility add-on. In 2000, Windows introduced an on-screen keyboard and text-to-speech for blind or illiterate users. In 2010, MSU transitioned to remote real-time captioning, allowing classroom users who are deaf or hard of hearing to connect wirelessly to a remote captioner, rather than having a captioner seated nearby. In 2023, Sony improved PlayStation accessibility by adding clear tags to games for visual, audio, control, and gameplay features. They also introduced Project Leonardo, an adaptive PlayStation 5 controller that can be customized and supports third-party accessories for players with limited motor control.

== Need for Accessibility Apps ==
Fifteen percent of the world's population, experience some form of disability, equivalent to one billion people. Accessibility apps have become more common in response to increasing demand for interconnected technology. the 2018 Australian Human Rights Commission states that more measures need to be put in place in order to achieve equal access and for all groups of society to reap the benefits of today's digitally connected society. Pick and Azari (2008) discuss the importance of raising awareness about current advancements and future possibilities in accessibility and technology.

== Accessibility features in iPhones and computers ==
People with disabilities are able to increase the accessibility of technology they already own by enabling specific features. For example, within the settings app on iPhones, there are several features that increase accessibility such as 'Assistive Touch', 'Classic Invert Colours', 'Colour Filters' and 'Magnifier'. These adjustments found in iPhone settings have the ability to improve accessibility for people who experience disabilities such as motor impairments, visual impairments, colour blindness, and sensory insensitivities. Hence, it is not just independent apps but also features within software that are able to increase accessibility for individuals.

== Benefits ==
Accessibility apps provide a platform to increase accessibility to services for people with disability. The lower costs of services made available through new technologies can improve equality amongst groups with disability.

New technology can make learning material more accessible, potentially increasing the number of students able to participate in university courses.

Some apps are designed to help individuals with disabilities control household devices and complete daily tasks using voice recognition software. Additionally, apps have been created that allow a person to take a photo of their surroundings and their phone will describe the photo. For example, a person who is vision impaired can go to a supermarket, take a photo of a product, and the app will name the product. Alternatively, a person can take a photo of another person and the app will describe the person's emotions audibly.

People with disabilities often encounter challenges in situations that may not be immediately apparent to those without disabilities. The study (Mayordomo-Martinez et al., 2019) explains how an accessibility app functions and what apps need to consist of in order to achieve accessibility. The study uses 'Access Earth' as a prime example of an app that has made the outside environment more accessible to people. The app achieves this by locating and sharing facilities such as parking, bathrooms, and buildings in a free global community. Hence, this app aims to improve accessibility in daily life, potentially enhancing independence for users with disabilities. Furthermore, there are also apps, such as 'AccessNow' that enhance accessibility by creating global communities for members to share and search for accessibility information.

A recent study (Yu, Parmanto, Dicianno, & Pramana, 2015) looked at the accessibility of mental health self-care app, iMHere, for individuals and its accessibility options for people with Spina Bifida. All of the participants in the study could use the app without assistance and stated they would use the app again in the future. However, there were complications in regards to accessibility of the app. Participants noted that due to each of their unique disabilities, there was a need for the app to allow personalisation by the user in order to modify content appearance such as the size and colour of text.

== Case study ==
The Commonwealth Bank Eftpos system that was released in 2017 was an example of a poorly executed app that did not include accessibility features. The bank's new system was a tablet with no physical buttons or tactile keys, unlike other previous Eftpos machines. As such, the system was heavily criticised by the disabled community because of the touchscreen-only system which forced the blind and visually impaired to either give out their credit card pins when paying or to not go through with the payment. Stores with such machines were no longer accessible to people who are blind or visually impaired. Such people were forced to resort to family members to complete their weekly grocery shop because the individual had stopped going to retailers with these machines. Ultimately, this app which was created without the consideration of the disabled community meant that individuals and small businesses who were both using the app suffered as a result of payments being terminated.

A few years later, in 2019, Commonwealth Bank of Australia agreed to introduce a software upgrade to the Eftpos machine to make it more accessible for the visually impaired. This was a result of a discrimination case brought against the bank and several other campaigns from vision-impaired Australians. CBA responded to the criticism by introducing several measures to improve the accessibility of its system. Firstly, they released upgrades to the software to include easier activation of the accessibility feature and other enhancements. Secondly, the bank added training available to merchants so they could understand how to use and implement the accessibility features to customers. Finally, CBA also created a video for card holders demonstrating how they can activate the accessibility features and use them when purchasing an item in store. CBA has stated that it is now committed to ensuring that accessibility will be a key factor and consideration behind further product development.

== Discriminative aspects of technology ==
Technology can contain discriminatory aspects that can negatively affect individuals. Technology can raise concerns related to privacy, security, safety, and non-discrimination.

Some concerns have been raised about new technology's potential impact on privacy. New technology has the ability to personalise products and services by altering preferences and characteristics relevant to the user. This process is possible because of the collection, storage, use and transfer of the user's personal information. Data collection of user's personal information can be used to influence search engine results, direct marketing, and opens up the possibility of mass surveillance by the government and private sector. For this reason, people are concerned with their online privacy.

New technology has the ability to enhance but also threaten personal safety and security. For example, new technology such as drones can be used to identify threats to society or be deployed as weapons.

New technology poses a threat to the right to non-discrimination and equal treatment. Economic inequality can become apparent when a particular labor force is replaced by robotics. Although, technology can also reduce inequality, for instance, sustainable energy technologies can improve the livelihoods of those living in developing nations. Access to technological innovations can vary based on economic, social, and physical factors.

Some studies suggest that technology may be less accessible to elderly individuals. For example, older people may have difficulty accessing online government services or could be at risk of personal health data being exploited. Children and young people can also be discriminated against by technology through the use of social platforms. People with disability are a group that are especially exposed to the discriminating aspects of technology. Currently, people with disabilities tend to have lower digital inclusion rates, which can limit their access to certain digital platforms. Concerns remain surrounding affordability, lack of access to equipment, lack of awareness surrounding disability-specific options, insufficient touchscreen technology for people who have vision impairments, and that inaccessible communication technologies can impose employment discrimination on those with disability.

There are several frameworks and models in place on a global perspective to protect people with disability from discrimination aspects of technology. For example, in Australia, The Convention on the Rights of Persons with Disabilities (CRPD) expects that all private sector companies and government bodies release information that is accessible to all groups of society. The Australian Government is required to test the experience of users with disability of its services to ensure that information is accessible. In comparison, the US is known to have one of the most comprehensive legal frameworks to ensure online equality. However, this set of laws are not properly enforced and thus people with disability still lack equal online access.
