= Live Transcribe =

Captioning application developed by Google for Android

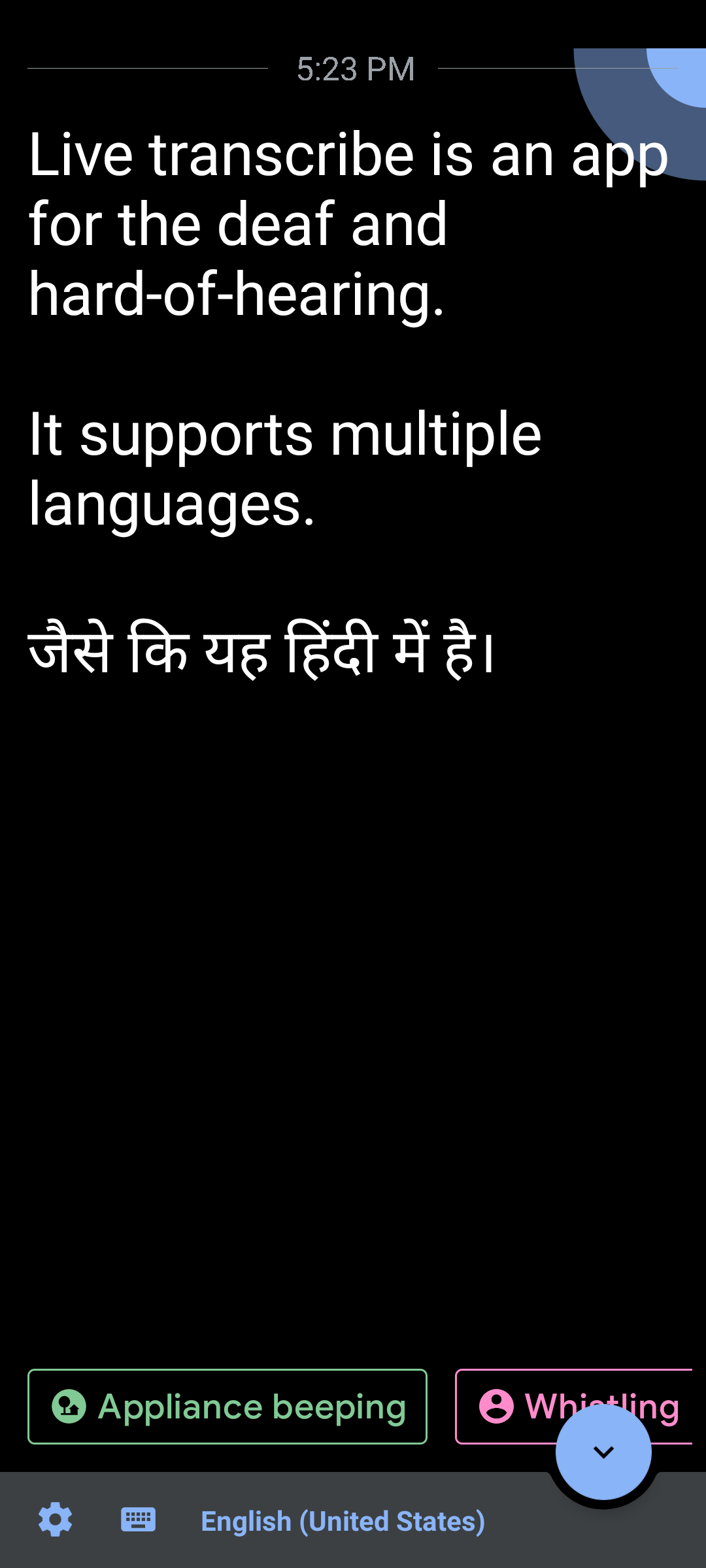
- A screenshot of Google Live Transcribe running on a Samsung Galaxy S20
- Developer: Google Research
- Release: February 4, 2019; 7 years ago
- Stable release: 6.6.602963593 / February 5, 2024; 2 years ago
- Operating system: Android
- Size: 4 MB
- Type: Accessibility
- License: Apache License 2.0
- Website: www.android.com/accessibility/live-transcribe/

Live Transcribe is a mobile app for real-time captioning, developed by Google for the Android operating system. Development on the application began in partnership with Gallaudet University. It was publicly released as a free beta for Android 5.0+ on the Google Play Store on February 4, 2019. As of early 2023 it had been downloaded over 500 million times.

== Development ==
Researchers Dimitri Kanevsky, Sagar Savla and Chet Gnegy at Google developed the app in collaboration with researchers at Gallaudet University, an American university for the education of the deaf and hard of hearing. The app uses machine learning to generate captions, similar to YouTube's auto-generated captions.

In August 2019, Google made Live Transcribe an open-source project.

== Features ==
The app uses speech recognition to generate live captions in over 80 languages with varying accuracy. The app, which requires connection to the Internet to function, is available to download on the Google Play Store.

A later update to the app displayed information on sounds such as clapping, laughter, music, applause, and whistling.

In May 2020, the app started supporting transcription in Albanian, Burmese, Estonian, Macedonian, Mongolian, Punjabi, and Uzbek, supporting 70 languages.

In March 2022, the app was updated with support to transcribe offline, without Internet connection, so long as the appropriate language pack has been installed. The offline mode is only available for devices with 6GB of RAM and certain Google Pixel devices.
