= YouTube Music =

Music streaming service by YouTube

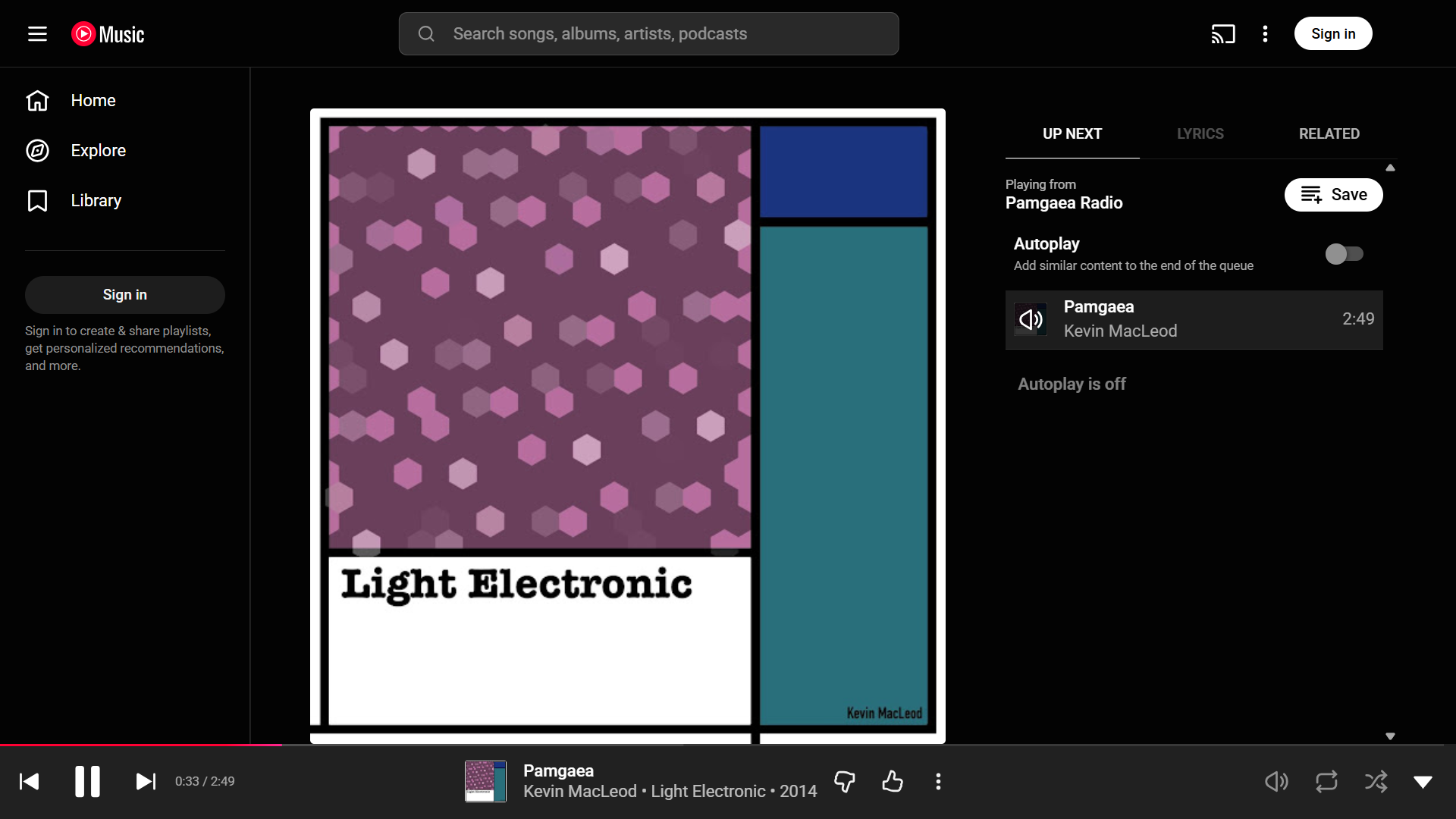
- YouTube Music playing "Pamgaea" by Kevin MacLeod in 2025
- Developer: YouTube
- Key people: Neal Mohan (YouTube CEO); T. Jay Fowler (Director of Product Management); Lyor Cohen (Global Head of YouTube & Music)
- Type: music and video streaming
- Launched: November 12, 2015; 11 years ago
- Platforms: Android; iOS; ChromeOS; Wear OS; Google Nest; Sonos; Android TV; Android Auto; WatchOS; Web; audioOS; Tesla
- Members: 125 million paid subscribers (as of March 2025)
- Availability: 119 countries and territories; mostly in the Americas, Europe and Oceania, and in parts of Africa and Asia (see full list)
- Website: music.youtube.com

YouTube Music is a music streaming service developed by the American video platform YouTube, a subsidiary of Google. The service is designed with an interface that allows users to simultaneously explore music audios and music videos from YouTube-based genres, playlists and recommendations. On December 1, 2020, YouTube Music replaced Google Play Music as Google's primary brand for music streaming. In April 2023, the service expanded its offerings to include support for podcasts shortly before Google Podcasts was shut down.

== History ==
The YouTube Music app was unveiled in October 2015 and released the following month; its release came alongside the unveiling of YouTube Premium (originally called YouTube Red), a larger subscription service that covers the entirety of the YouTube platform, including the Music app. Although redundant to Google's existing Google Play Music All Access subscription service, the app was designed for users who primarily consume music through YouTube.

On May 17, 2018, YouTube announced a new version of the YouTube Music service, including a web-based desktop player and redesigned mobile app, more dynamic recommendations based on various factors, and Google artificial intelligence technology to search songs based on lyrics and descriptions. In addition, YouTube Music became a separate subscription service (positioned as a more direct competitor to Apple Music and Spotify), offering ad-free and background/audio-only streaming, and downloading for offline playback, for music content on YouTube. The service's benefits continued to be available as part of the existing YouTube Premium service and to Google Play Music All Access subscribers. The YouTube Music subscription was priced in line with its competitors at US$9.99 per month; the price of YouTube Premium was concurrently increased to $11.99 for new subscribers.

In 2018, YouTube Music reached multiple sponsorship agreements with Dick Clark Productions to serve as a partner for its television specials Dick Clark's New Year's Rockin' Eve and the American Music Awards.

YouTube Music became available on Google Assistant smart speakers (including Google Nest smart speakers) on April 18, 2019, with feature-limited ad-supported playback available for non-subscribers in only a limited number of countries.

In July 2024, YouTube Music became available for Tesla cars.

== Features ==
The availability of music encompasses numerous releases from mainstream artists and extends to any video categorized as music on the YouTube platform.

YouTube Music initially operated in parallel with Google Play Music, but the latter was shut down in December 2020. Product manager Elias Roman stated in 2018 that they aimed to reach feature parity with Google Play Music before migrating users to it, but as of 2024 this has not been achieved.

In September 2019, YouTube Music replaced Google Play Music in the core Google Mobile Services bundle distributed on new Android devices. In May 2020, an update was released to allow imports from Google Play Music, including purchased music, playlists, cloud libraries, and recommendations.

A "pre-save" feature for upcoming releases was added in May 2020.

In 2021, YouTube Music introduced a seasonal recap feature, which serves as a culmination of a user's top artists, songs, albums and playlists, in a similar style to Spotify Wrapped.

In February 2023, YouTube Music launched Radio Builder, a free and from anywhere accessible web service for both paying subscribers and free users with iOS or Android devices. It allows users to create a custom radio station, selecting up to 30 artists with an option to hear only their songs or from comparable musicians.

In April 2023, podcasts were added to the service, initially for users in the US only with a worldwide rollout planned at a later date. Google Podcasts was shut down worldwide in June 2024 with YouTube Music replacing it.

=== Subscriptions ===
The free tier plays songs in its music video version where applicable. The premium tier plays official tracks of the album unless the user searches for the music video version. YouTube Music Premium and YouTube Premium subscribers can switch to an audio-only mode that can play in the background while the application is not in use. The free tier does not allow audio-only mode with background playback as it displays video advertisements.

The free tier's audio quality supports up to 128 kbit/s, in AAC and Opus audio formats. For users with a premium subscription, a bitrate of 256 kbit/s is also offered.

YouTube Music Premium and YouTube Premium plans are available in individual and family variants. A family plan allows up to six family members from the same household to access plan features. Eligible students can obtain a discount on an individual plan.

| Subscription tiers | Ads | Skipping and scrubbing | Offline mode | Background playback | Audio quality |
|---|---|---|---|---|---|
| Music Free | Yes | Unlimited | Podcast only | Podcast only | 50, 70, 128 kbit/s VBR Opus; 48 kbit/s HE-AAC, 128 kbit/s CBR AAC |
| Music Premium | No | Unlimited | Available | Available | All free tier qualities, including 256 kbit/s AAC & Opus |
| Premium | No | Unlimited | Available | Available | All free tier qualities, including 256 kbit/s AAC & Opus |

== Geographic availability ==
As of March 2024, YouTube Music is available in most of the Americas, Europe and Oceania, as well as parts of Africa and Asia, with a total availability in 119 markets. Following the Russian invasion of Ukraine, Google indefinitely suspended all of its all payment and subscription-based services in the country, including YouTube Music.

Countries where YouTube Music is available (as of March 2024)

History of expansion
| Date | Countries/regions | Ref. |
|---|---|---|
| May 22, 2018 | Australia (Note: Two-person plan available); Mexico (Note: Annual plans available); New Zealand; South Korea (Note: Paid memberships only) (Note: Family and student plans unavailable); United States (Note: Annual plans available) | |
| June 18, 2018 | Austria; Canada (Note: Annual plans available); Finland; France (Note: Two-person plan available); Germany (Note: Annual plans available); (Republic of Ireland) Ireland; Italy; Norway; ~~Russia~~ (Note: Suspended on March 10, 2022 until further notice); Spain; Sweden; United Kingdom | |
| August 29, 2018 | Belgium; Netherlands; Denmark; Luxembourg | |
| September 26, 2018 | Brazil (Note: Annual plans available) | |
| November 14, 2018 | Chile; Colombia; Japan (Note: Annual plans available); Peru; Portugal; Switzerland; Ukraine | |
| March 13, 2019 | Argentina (Note: Two-person plan available); Bolivia; Costa Rica; Dominican Republic; Ecuador; El Salvador; Guatemala; Honduras; India (Note: Annual plans available) (Note: Two-person plan available); Nicaragua; Panama; Paraguay; South Africa; Uruguay | |
| May 16, 2019 | Bulgaria; Cyprus; Czech Republic; Hungary; North Macedonia; Poland; Romania | |
| July 17, 2019 | (Bosnia and Herzegovina) Bosnia & Herzegovina; Croatia; Estonia; Greece; Iceland (Note: Family and student plans unavailable); Latvia; Liechtenstein; Lithuania; Malta; Serbia; Slovakia; Slovenia (Note: Family and student plans unavailable); Turkey (Note: Annual plans available) | |
| September 11, 2019 | Bahrain; Israel; Kuwait; Lebanon; Oman; Qatar; Saudi Arabia; United Arab Emirates | |
| November 6, 2019 | Hong Kong (Note: Two-person plan available); Indonesia; Malaysia; Philippines; Singapore; Taiwan (Note: Two-person plan available); Thailand (Note: Annual plans available) | |
| March 10, 2020 | Nigeria; Turks and Caicos Islands; Venezuela (Note: Family and student plans unavailable) | |
| June 10, 2020 | American Samoa; Aruba; Belarus (Note: Family and student plans unavailable); Bermuda; Cayman Islands; Egypt; French Guiana; French Polynesia; Guadeloupe; Guam; Northern Mariana Islands; Papua New Guinea; Puerto Rico; (United States Virgin Islands) U.S. Virgin Islands | |
| April 12, 2023 | Vietnam | |
| August 2, 2023 | Bangladesh (Note: Two-person plan available); Nepal (Note: Two-person plan available); Pakistan; Sri Lanka | |
| December 5, 2023 | Algeria; Cambodia (Note: Two-person plan available); (Georgia (country)) Georgia; Ghana; Iraq; Jordan; Kenya; Laos (Note: Two-person plan available); Senegal; Tunisia | |
| March 14, 2024 | Azerbaijan; Jamaica; Kazakhstan; Libya; Morocco; Réunion; Tanzania; Uganda; Yemen; Zimbabwe | |

== See also ==
- Comparison of music streaming services
- List of podcast clients
