= Nymwars =

Conflicts over internet service real name policies

Nymwars was a series of conflicts over policies that mandate that all users of certain social media platforms identify themselves using their legal names. The term is mostly associated with Google's name policies on Google+ and YouTube. Nymwars is a blend word composed from (pseudo)nym and wars. The name appears to have gained prominence as the hashtag "#nymwars" on Twitter.

Conflicts regarding Google+ began by July 2011 when the social networking site began enforcing its real-name-only policy by suspending the accounts of users it felt were not following the policy. Pseudonyms, nicknames, and non-standard real names (for example, mononyms or names that include scripts from multiple languages) were suspended. The issue was settled in 2014 when Google announced that it was ending its real-name-only policy.

A predecessor to the Google+ conflict was Blizzard's RealID which, starting in 2010, exposes the name on the player's credit card, and is mandatory to use some game features (cross-game chat) and was nearly made mandatory to post on discussion forums.

These issues have existed since the beginning of online identity, and are related to the alleged online disinhibition effect. The resulting discussions have raised many issues regarding naming, cultural sensitivity, public and private identity, privacy, and the role of social media in modern discourse. The debate has been covered widely in the press including Wired, The Atlantic, and The New York Times.

== Google ==
Google Plus was launched in late June 2011. At the time of launch, the site's user content and conduct policy stated, "To help fight spam and prevent fake profiles, use the name your friends, family or co-workers usually call you." Many users signed up using nicknames, handles, stage names, or other names by which they were commonly known, but which did not necessarily match the name on their government-issued ID.

The first suspensions for name-related reasons occurred in July 2011, and included Limor Fried's account, which included the name "LadyAda" (by which she is widely known), nerdcore rapper Doctor Popular, and LA Weekly and Los Angeles Times columnist A.V. Flox. Account suspensions over the following weeks included those who were using nicknames, handles, and pseudonyms; those whose legal names were unusual, including mononymous users; and some users who Google mistakenly believed were impersonating famous individuals, such as Facebook employee and Mozilla founder Blake Ross, and actor William Shatner.

Awareness of the issue grew rapidly, via Twitter, Google+ itself, and a variety of media outlets. By early August, the Electronic Frontier Foundation had posted "A Case for Pseudonymity" in response to the issue.

Google initially responded on 25 July when vice president Bradley Horowitz promised improvements to the suspension and enforcement process. On 17 August, Google implemented a "grace period" before suspension, and on 19 August, a "verified account" program for celebrities and high-profile users.

On 19 October 2011, at the Web 2.0 Summit, Google executive Vic Gundotra revealed that Google+ would begin supporting pseudonyms and other types of identity within a few months. However, as of the 16 October 2012 policy documents, Google still required that participants "Use your common first and last name" adding "our Name Policy may not be for everyone at this time."

On 15 July 2014, Google indicated that the real-name policy was being ended, announcing that "Over the years, as Google+ grew and its community became established, we steadily opened up this policy, from allowing +Page owners to use any name of their choosing to letting YouTube users bring their usernames into Google+. Today, we are taking the last step: there are no more restrictions on what name you can use."

=== Expired Google policy ===
Google's official support page described their real-names policy, which has since been abandoned:

Google+ makes connecting with people on the web more like connecting with people in the real world. Because of this, it's important to use your common name so that the people you want to connect with can find you. Your common name is the name your friends, family or co-workers usually call you. For example, if your legal name is Charles Jones Jr. but you normally use Chuck Jones or Junior Jones, any of these would be acceptable.

— Google+ Naming Policy

Google offers support and assistance to anyone whose profile has been suspended, including an appeal process, and a referral to their Content Policy. If an account is suspended, users will not be able to access Google services that require active profiles, such as Buzz, Reader, and Picasa. They will, however, be able to access other Google services such as Gmail.

Google suggested that their naming policy may not have been for everyone, and recommended if a user chooses not to comply, to make a copy of their Google+ data, and leave.

=== Google's previous stance ===
A Google support worker has stated:

Google Profiles is a product that works best in the identified state. This way you can be certain you're connecting with the right person, and others will have confidence knowing that there is someone real behind the profile they're checking out. For this reason, Google Profiles requires you to use the name that you commonly go by in daily life.

In August 2011, Google CEO Eric Schmidt was quoted as stating that Google+ was intended as an identity management service more than as a social network, and that the use of real names would be necessary for other planned Google products based on this service. He also asserted that "the Internet will work better if people know that you're a real person rather than a fake person".

Google vice president Bradley Horowitz (in a Google+ post on 24 January 2012) announced that Google is updating its policy "to broaden support for established pseudonyms". However, the updated policy has been criticized for being too vague concerning what is an "established" pseudonym, and insufficiently flexible to protect online privacy.

=== Criticism ===
A number of high-profile commentators have publicly criticized Google's policies, including technologists Violet Blue, Jamie Zawinski, Kevin Marks, and Robert Scoble and organisations such as the Electronic Frontier Foundation.

Criticisms have been wide-ranging, for example:

- The policy fails to acknowledge long-standing Internet culture and conventions.
- Using real names online can disadvantage or endanger some individuals, such as victims of violence or harassment.
- Using a pseudonym is different from anonymity, and a pseudonym used consistently denotes an "authentic personality".
- Google's arguments fail to address the financial gain represented by connecting personal data to real-world identities.
- Google has inconsistently enforced their policy, especially by making exceptions for celebrities using pseudonyms and mononyms.
- The policy as stated is insufficient for preventing spam.
- The policy may run afoul of legal constraints such as the German "Telemediengesetz" federal law, which makes anonymous access to online services a legal requirement.
- The policy does not prevent trolls. It is up to social media to encourage the growth of healthy social norms, and forcefully telling people how they must behave cannot be efficient.

== Facebook ==
Facebook has always had a "real name" policy but enforcement has traditionally been sporadic and usually dependent on reports by users.

In November 2011, Facebook suspended Salman Rushdie's account, and then reinstated it under his little-used first name Ahmed, before backing down and restoring it to his preferred name.

In the fall of 2014, Facebook began requiring drag performers to change their Facebook identities to their legal names, notably including performer Sister Roma. This is reported to be the work of a single person systematically reporting them.

== U.S. Department of Justice ==
In November 2011 the United States Department of Justice said that it wants to retain the ability under the Computer Fraud and Abuse Act to prosecute people who provide false information online with the intent to harm others. This statement, coming as it did shortly after the Google+ and Facebook actions, raised fears that web users could face criminal prosecution for using pseudonyms. The Justice Department said it would use that power only in select cases, such as a case in 2011 where it prosecuted a woman who used a MySpace account under a fake name to bully a 13-year-old girl who eventually committed suicide.

== See also ==
- Real-name system
