= Naver =

South Korean web portal

Naver Co., Ltd.
- Wordmark used from 2018

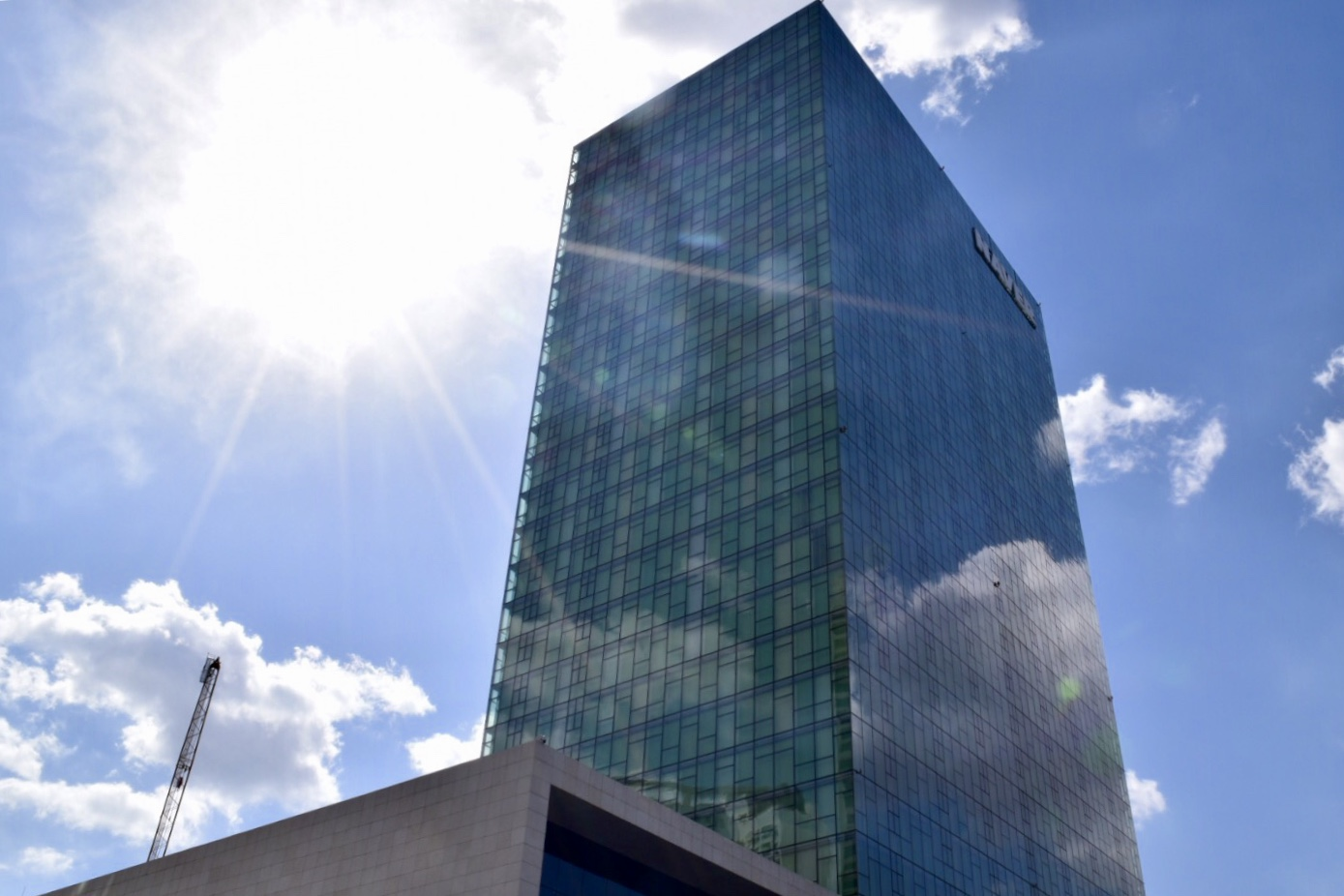
- Trade name: NAVER
- Type: Subsidiary
- Industry: Internet; Artificial intelligence; Cloud computing
- Founded: 2 June 1999; 27 years ago
- Founder: Lee Hae-jin
- Headquarters: Seongnam-si, Korea
- Area served: Worldwide
- Products: NAVER Mail; NAVER Map; NAVER News
- Parent: Naver Corporation
- Website: www.naver.com

Naver (Korean: 네이버; stylized as NAVER) is a South Korean online platform operated by the Naver Corporation. The company's products include a search engine, email hosting, blogs, maps, and mobile payment.

== History ==
Naver was the first Korean web provider to develop its own search engine. The company was founded on 2 June 1999, and is headquartered in Seongnam, South Korea. Naver is a combination of 'navigate' and the suffix '-er', referring to a person who navigates the vast ocean of information on the Internet. Naver provides community services including blogs and cafes, other convenient services such as knowledge, shopping, maps, books, e-mail, and a Naver toolbar.

In August 2000, Naver launched its 'comprehensive search' service, which allows users to get a variety of results from a single search query on one page, organized by type, including blogs, websites, images, and web communities.

Naver became an early pioneer in user-generated content through the creation of the 'Knowledge iN' (네이버 지식인)' service in 2002. In Knowledge iN, users can pose questions on any subject and select from answers provided by other users, awarding points to those who give the best answers. Knowledge iN was launched three years before Yahoo! introduced its similar 'Yahoo! Answers' service and now possesses a database of over 200 million answers. Bradley Horowitz, former Vice President of Product Strategy at Yahoo!, has cited Knowledge iN as the inspiration for Yahoo! Answers, which was launched three years after Naver introduced the original service.

Over the years, Naver has continued to expand its services. Naver Blog started with the name 'paper' in June 2003 and evolved to 'blog' in October 2003. 'Webtoon' is a South Korean webtoon publisher launched in 2004 by Naver.

In May 2005, Naver started the Real-time Search service. The rising search terms was a chart in Naver that highlighted trending topics in real-time. The top searches would appear on the portal main page, reaching a large number of users.

From 2005 to 2007, Naver expanded its multimedia search services, including music and video search, as well as mobile search.

In February 2011, Naver launched the Line messaging app.

In 2019, Naver reorganized its mobile version of the main screen, excluding search windows and some menus. In response, more than 3,000 comments opposing the change were posted.

In October 2023, Naver announced the beta release of its AI chatbot service, 'CLOVA X' (클로바X).

Naver mobile map application began providing real-time service on natural disaster information on 15 September 2024.

== Services ==
=== Naver Dictionary ===
Naver Dictionary was launched in 1999, alongside Naver. It initially supported only Korean and English. As of 2024, it supports 67 languages. The dictionary aggregates results from a number of other dictionaries, including Urimalsaem, which is operated by the National Institute of Korean Language. It also aggregates results from English-language dictionaries such as Oxford Dictionary of English and the Collins English Dictionary. It also operates an open-source dictionary called Open Dictionary PRO (ODP).

=== Junior Naver ===
Junior Naver (쥬니어 네이버), also known as Juniver (쥬니버), is a portal website for children, similar to Yahooligans. Junior Naver offers services such as avatars, educational content, quizzes, videos, Q&A, and a homework helper. It uses a panel of experts and educators to filter out harmful content, ensuring a safe internet environment for children. With its competitors Daum Kids and Yahoo Kids having closed down, Junior Naver is now the only children's portal site operating in Korea.

=== Knowledge iN ===
Knowledge iN (지식iN), formerly Knowledge Search (지식검색), is an online Q&A platform launched in October 2002. The tool allows users to ask any question and receive answers from other users. Naver became an early pioneer in user-generated content through the creation of the 'Knowledge iN' (네이버 지식인)' service. Bradley Horowitz, former Vice President of Product Strategy at Yahoo!, has cited Knowledge iN as the inspiration for Yahoo! Answers, which was launched three years after Naver introduced the original service.

Naver encourages unauthorized publishing to attract users to its Knowledge iN service. This led to lower-quality content when compared with Wikipedia as of 2007, which had more moderators. In April 2024, the service was reorganized so that answers could be continuously registered without closing questions, and new answers could be registered even if there were adopted answers. In addition, the limit on the number of additional questions and additional answers has disappeared.

=== Naver Webtoon ===
Naver Webtoon (네이버 웹툰), later simply WEBTOON, is a webcomic platform where users have free access to a variety of webtoons created by professional artists. Users can also pay publishers to view comic books and genre fiction content online. Naver has incorporated a 'Challenge' section that allows amateurs to post and promote their works.

=== Naver Cafe ===
Naver Cafe (네이버 카페) is a service that allows Naver users to create their own internet communities. As of May 2017, 10.5 million cafes were active. Each person can create up to 300 cafes. From January to August 2024, Naver Cafe's MAU averaged 30 million, up about 10% from the previous year.

=== Naver Blog ===
Naver Blog (네이버 블로그) started with the name 'paper' in June 2003 and evolved to 'blog' in October 2003. It had 23 million users as of April 2016. In 2023, there were 1.26 million new users.

For two weeks from 1 May 2021, Naver held an event to pay up to 16,000 won to people who posted on Naver's blog every day. However, this event ended early due to several incidents involving people with multiple IDs. Many participants in the event criticized Naver's response.

Naver announced on its official blog that it would resume its "Today's Diary Challenge (#오늘일기챌린지)" event, which ended early in three days, from May 24. However, only those who participated in the previously discontinued event (who completed the three-day record) can participate in the event.

On 13 May 2021, Naver announced that it would display profile pictures along with comments posted on Naver news articles. Previously, only the first four digits of the author's ID were disclosed, making it difficult to identify users. Naver implemented this change expecting it to facilitate user recognition and address issues with malicious comments. Critics, however, criticized the company for censoring comments.

=== Naver NOW ===
Naver NOW (formerly Naver TV) is a video streaming and sharing platform that primarily offers web dramas distributed by Naver. Naver NOW replaced the Naver TV mobile app, while Naver TV continues to serve as a web portal.

=== Naver Pay ===
In June 2015, Naver launched its own payment service, Naver Pay, which allows mobile payment service and online checkout. It is Naver's second mobile payment service after Line Pay. Naver Pay is the most widely used mobile payment service in South Korea.

=== Naver Plus Membership ===
Naver Plus Membership (N+ Membership; 네이버 플러스 멤버십, N+멤버십) is Naver's paid subscription service launched in June 2020. Its most significant feature is that upon paying a monthly or annual subscription fee, users receive up to 4% additional points (totaling up to 5%) on top of the basic 1% points earned when making payments via Naver Pay for Naver Shopping, reservations, travel, etc. In addition to shopping benefits, it features a customized structure that allows users to select and use one desired service each month from a variety of digital content benefits, such as Netflix (Ad Standard), Naver Webtoon Cookies, and TVING. Recently, it has been continuously expanding the scope of benefits across commerce by closely linking with the 'Naver Plus Store' to fully provide membership-exclusive 'Naver Delivery' free shipping and free returns and exchanges.

=== Naver Mail ===
Naver Mail (네이버 메일) is an email service available to all Naver users. Each user is provided with up to 5GB of storage.

=== Naver Maps ===
Naver Maps added navigation features in December 2015. In December 2017, Naver linked its "Naver i" voice assistant to its map service. In September 2024, Naver Maps began providing real-time information on natural disasters from the Korea Meteorological Administration.

=== Naver News ===
Naver News (네이버 뉴스) is a news aggregator operated by Naver since 2000. The website co-founded a committee with Daum News to evaluate news presses for the service in 2015, but it was indefinitely shut down in 2023 after allegations of biased audit. It also runs Naver Enter, a subdivision focusing on entertainment news.

=== Naver Shopping ===
It began in September 2000 as a Shopping Agent Price Comparison (쇼핑 에이전트 가격 비교) service that compared prices and connected online shopping malls. In 2002, SOHO Mall (소호몰) was launched for small and medium-sized shopping mall operators. In 2003, Naver Knowledge Shopping (네이버 지식 쇼핑) launched, supporting shopping knowledge search, price comparison and purchasing. Shopping TV (쇼핑TV), which partnered with major home shopping companies to provide internet-exclusive video product information, opened in 2008. In 2012, Naver launched Shop N (샵N), an open market-type service where sellers could directly open their own stores, register product information, and sell products. In 2014, Naver withdrew Shop N and launched Store Farm (스토어 팜), which had zero entry fees. Naver Pay (네이버 페이) was implemented in 2015. In 2018, Store Farm was revamped into Smart Store (스마트 스토어), which enhanced data statistics and mobile features.

In 2024, 'Naver Plus Store' (네이버 플러스 스토어), which recommends products using an artificial intelligence called HyperCLOVA X developed by Naver, was added to 'Naver Shopping.' The Naver Plus Store app was released on March 12, 2025.

With the launch of Naver Plus Store in 2025 and AI personalized recommendations, annual revenue in the commerce sector surged by 26.2% year-over-year. As of 2024, the e-commerce market share was 22.7% for Coupang and 20.7% for Naver, and the gap between the two companies is narrowing.

==== Naver Smart Store ====
Naver Smart Store is an open market platform that was first launched in 2012 under the name Shop N (샵N), changed to Store Farm (스토어 팜) in 2014, and finally to 'Smart Store' (스마트 스토어) in 2018. It provides infrastructure that allows individuals and small and medium-sized enterprises (SMEs) to open and operate online shopping malls without complex coding or initial setup costs. It provides sellers with data on traffic sources and customer behavior analysis through Naver's proprietary data analysis tool, Biz Advisor (비즈 어드바이저).

==== Naver Plus Store ====
Naver Plus Store (Naver+ Store; 네이버 플러스 스토어) is a shopping app launched as a separate app from the existing Naver Shopping in March 2025. As of 2026, annual revenue in the commerce sector grew by 26.2% year-over-year.

=== Naver Shopping Live ===
Naver Shopping Live (네이버 쇼핑 라이브) is a live commerce platform operated by Naver. Broadcasts can be transmitted via mobile phones or camcorders, with a resolution of 1080*1920 and a vertical format similar to YouTube shorts. It is currently the platform with the highest number of consumers in Korea. As of 2023, 73.6% of mobile shoppers in South Korea use Naver Shopping Live as their primary platform.

=== PRISM Live Studio ===
PRISM Live Studio (프리즘 라이브 스튜디오) is a live streaming application available for both mobile and PC users. Streamers can simultaneously broadcast to multiple platforms, a practice known as simulcasting, with support for up to 1080p HD resolution. Supported platforms include YouTube, Facebook, Twitch, Periscope, V Live, Naver TV, afreecaTV, KakaoTV, and RTMP channels. The application can also be utilized for video editing purposes.

=== Naver Papago ===
In July 2017, Naver launched Papago, an AI-based mobile translator that uses a large neural network technology named N2MT (Naver Neural Machine Translation). It can translate text and phrases in 15 different languages by analyzing context instead of statistical analysis. Papago app has so far garnered over 20 million downloads.

=== Search engine ===
As of 2024, Naver is used for most searches in South Korea. In 2025, Naver provided twice as many searches as Google.

=== CHZZK ===
CHZZK is a game-focused live streaming platform operated by Naver, officially launched in May 2024. In 2025, viewing time increased by 28% and chat activity by 37% year-over-year, reflecting growth in user engagement.

== See also ==
- List of search engines
- Search engine
- Comparison of search engines
