= Zitrr Camera =

- Original author: Zitrr Studios
- Developer: Rootwork Systems
- Initial release: March 10, 2013
- Operating system: iOS 5.1 or later
- Size: 17.3 MB
- Type: Photography
- Licence: Proprietary
- Website: zitrr.com

Zitrr Camera is an iPhone camera app developed by Zitrr – a division of Rootwork Systems. The app can be used to apply real-time filters, effects and lenses to both photos and videos. Zitrr Camera provides 8 different shooting modes and 6 grid modes, has a gallery that allows the user to add tags, search for photos by location, tags and date, and view the captured photos as a slideshow. Zitrr Camera also provides integrated sharing options via Facebook, Twitter, YouTube, Flickr, Instagram, Tumblr, Google+ and direct emailing.

Zitrr Camera has generally received positive reception. AppAdvice has reviewed the app as "fast, fluid, responsive and has plenty of features even for the power user." Knolpad says "Effects in Zitrr Camera contain exactly what is required to give an artistic touch to your perfect photos. With the unique Effects, you can try sketch effect on your photographs, enhance the contours of the figures, or give it an embossed feel." iOSnoops has given Zitrr Camera a 4 star rating and a verdict of "Great".
