= Google Currents (social app) =

Defunct internal enterprise communication software developed by Google

- Other names: Google+ for G Suite
- Developer: Google
- Initial release: July 6, 2020; 5 years ago
- Platform: Android, iOS, Web app
- Successor: Spaces in Google Chat
- License: Proprietary
- Website: Google Currents' Introduction & Features at the Wayback Machine (archived 2022-01-04)

Google Currents was a software application developed by Google for internal enterprise communication. It is one of many products that constitute the Google Workspace line of products.

Google Currents was different from the also defunct Google app of the same name, which provided users with access to an electronic library of magazines from 2011 to 2013. It was replaced by the Spaces feature in Google Chat in March 2023. Google announced shutting down for business and education on July 5, 2023.

== History and development ==
Originally called Google+ for G Suite, Currents was, up until its closure in 2023, the sole remnant of Google's defunct social network Google+, which counted more than 375 million active members in 2016 but struggled to compete with the largest social network Facebook. A user profile in the platform was a publicly visible account and included fundamental characteristics of social networking services. Currents provided functionality that supported interdisciplinary collaborative experience alongside other G-Suite software and tools. Communities within the platform can be used for posting discussions and topics while users can follow communities, topics, or other users to keep up with published content. It was shut down entirely for personal and brand use on April 2, 2019. It also offered as the successor for Google internal company communication.

In June 2020, Google Currents was in Public Beta for Google Workspace clients. A free trial could also be requested.

On February 10, 2022, Google announced that it would be planning to "wind down" Google Currents and transition its users to the Spaces feature in Google Chat the next year.

== See also ==
- Google Wave
- Google Buzz
- Google+, the defunct and formerly related social network
- Google Currents (2011–2013), the unrelated discontinued news app
- Yammer, an analogous private social network for Microsoft 365 customers
- LinkedIn, business social media platform.
