= United States v. Google =

United States v. Google may refer to:

== Antitrust lawsuits ==
- United States v. Google LLC (2020), an antitrust suit brought by the U.S. Department of Justice in 2020 over Google's search engine market practices
- United States v. Google LLC (2023), an antitrust suit brought by the U.S Department of Justice in 2023 over Google's advertising technology market practices

== Privacy lawsuits ==
- United States v. Google Inc., a privacy lawsuit brought by the Federal Trade Commission, settled in 2012
