= Kardia =

Kardia may refer to:

- Kardia (Thrace), ancient Greek colony on the Thracian Chersonese
- Kardia, Kozani, a village in the municipality Eordaia, Kozani regional unit, Greece
- Kardia, Thessaloniki, a village in the municipality Thermi, Thessaloniki regional unit, Greece
- Kardia (film), 2006 Canadian film
- Kardia, a Greek term for heart often used as a prefix
- Kardia, a EKG monitoring device and application provided by AliveCor
