= Google Friend Connect =

Defunct social networking service

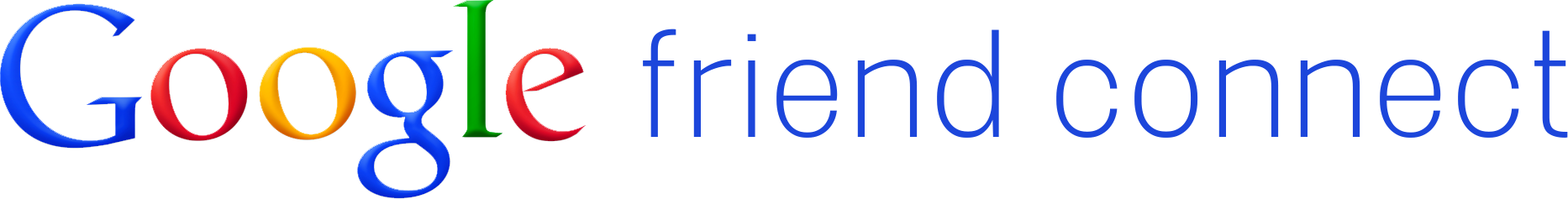
- Website type: Social Networking Script
- Available in: Multilingual
- Owner: Google
- Website: Official Webpage
- Commercial: Free
- Registration: OpenID
- Current status: Suspended

Google Friend Connect was a free social networking site, active from 2008 to 2012. Similar to Facebook Platform and MySpaceID, it allowed users to build a profile to share and update information through messaging, photographs and video content via third-party sites which acted as a host for profile sharing and social exchanges.

Google Friend Connect used open standards such as OpenID, OAuth and OpenSocial allowing usage with no registration, once authenticated they could use their existing profile and access a social graph when posting messages, the social graph feature allowed a user to post a message on a third-party site, but allowed viewing access only to other authorized "friends" contained within the user's chosen social graph.

Google Friend Connect was removed for all non-Blogger sites by March 1, 2012, and for Blogger sites on January 11, 2016.

== API ==
The Google Friend Connect API allowed website owners to query the content of user profiles, and provide website content from Hi5, Orkut, Plaxo, MySpace, Google Talk, Netlog, Twitter, and YouTube, along with ads tailored to the specific user via HTML/JavaScript "gadgets" into their pages

These "gadgets" included Social Bar, Comments, Ratings and Reviews, Featured Content, Interests' Poll, Recommendations, Events and Games. In June 2009, Google added a gadget called ClackPoint, which offered live text chat, conference calling and document sharing, including simultaneous editing by multiple users. A Community Widget was also offered, allowing website owners to include content from partner sites, similarly to other widgets such as BlogCatalog and Facebook Fan Pages.

== Statistics ==
As of 2011, it was estimated that approximately 200,000 websites used Google Friend Connect, with 2889 of them in the top million visited sites on the Internet. However Google estimated that over 5 million sites used Google Friend Connect. It was also claimed that 99% of sites were said to not be socially enabled prior to the introduction of Google Friend Connect.

== History ==
Google Friend Connect was first previewed at Google Campfire One on 13 May 2008 and launched within days of Facebook Platform. In December 2008, Google Friend Connect went into beta. Independent musician Ingrid Michaelson's official website was one of the first websites used as a prototype by Google to illustrate features from Google Friend Connect.

On November 23, 2011, Google's Senior Vice President of Operations Urs Hölzle announced that Friend Connect would be retired for all non-Blogger sites by March 1, 2012, and encouraged the now defunct Google+'s pages and off-site Page badges as the preferred alternative. On December 21, 2015, Google software engineer Michael Goddard announced that the service would be turned off on Blogger on January 11, 2016, stating that "we’ve seen that most people sign into Friend Connect with a Google Account."

== User data ==
Every user's data in Google Friend Connect consists of three things, a description of identity and 'my profile', the social graph, and content created by the user both published and not.

== Privacy ==
To access Google Friend Connect, sign in is by Google or other services that support OpenID such as Yahoo and ChromeOS's Instant Messenger which by extension means that Google collects information from those services. Google states that information provided to Google Friend Connectuser's activity, information about friends, Twitter account, and information collected by gadgets.

Publishing user activity to their activity streams in their social network is by default set to off. Site owners couldn't see user's sign-in information but the user's nickname, their image, the content they publish on the site, and the date they became a member. Site owners had the ability to moderate content on their site and remove users. Third-party sites received a user's Google account or OpenID username and the user's published information from that site, a third-party site could collect user information that is not related to the Google Friend Connect service.

A data breach was reported in November 2010, where an exploit allowed users to harvest email addresses for logged in users when a visitor used a website.

== Competition ==
Google and Facebook announced their plans for social networking sites within days of each other. Facebook blocked its users from using Google Friend Connect because of concerns with privacy as it believed that user information could be redistributed to others without the user's knowledge which Google responded by saying that "users are in control of their data at all times". In 2009 Google Friend Connect altered its installation process no longer required the need for any file uploads within days of Facebook doing the same.

== Features ==
Users could translate selected content of different language into their own specified language. Users didn't need multiple registrations as they could link their account on a social networking site to their account on a third party site. It was intended for personification to be achieved through gadgets like 'Interests' which allowed third-party sites to send out newsletters to those subscribed to the site and to customize newsletters based on user responses. Google Friend Connect had an 'AdSense' feature that let Google advertise based on site content and the user interests that are publicly shared by the user.

== See also ==
- Facebook Connect
- Facebook Platform
