= Google Buzz =

Defunct social networking service

- Website type: Social networking service
- Available in: Multilingual
- Dissolved: December 15, 2011; 14 years ago
- Predecessor: Google Wave (2009–2010)
- Successor: Google+ (2011–2019)
- Owner: Google
- Website: Former location: www.google.com/buzz
- Commercial: Yes
- Registration: Required
- Launched: February 9, 2010; 16 years ago
- Current status: Discontinued

Google Buzz was a social networking, microblogging and messaging tool developed by Google. It replaced Google Wave and was integrated into their web-based email program, Gmail. Users could share links, photos, videos, status messages and comments organized in "conversations" and visible in the user's inbox.

On October 14, 2011, Google announced that it would discontinue the service and that the existing content would be available in read-only mode. Buzz was discontinued on December 15, 2011, and superseded by Google+ (which was later discontinued on April 2, 2019).

Buzz enabled users to choose to share publicly with the world or privately to a group of friends each time they posted. Picasa, Flickr, Google Latitude, Google Reader, Google Sidewiki, YouTube, Blogger, FriendFeed, identi.ca and Twitter were integrated. The creation of Buzz was seen by industry analysts as an attempt by Google to compete with social networking websites like Facebook and microblogging services like Twitter. Buzz also included several user interface elements from other Google products (e.g., Google Reader), such as the ability to "like" a post.

Google co-founder Sergey Brin said that by offering social communications, Buzz would help bridge the gap between work and leisure, but the service was strongly criticized when it was introduced for insufficient attention to users' privacy.

== Platform ==
In May 2010, Google revealed APIs for Buzz, expanding it to being a platform as well as a service. This allowed third-party developers to write software that would be able to both read and post content to Buzz. Several partners demonstrated integration via the new APIs, including Seesmic and Socialwok.

== Mobile versions ==
When the service was accessed with a supported mobile device, Buzz tagged posts with the user's current location. Users were only permitted to use the actual physical location reported by the device for their Buzz posts; unlike the Google Latitude location-sharing service, Buzz did not allow users to manually specify an arbitrary location.

The mobile version of Buzz integrated with Google Maps so users could see who was around them. Buzz posts made through Google Maps were public and could be seen by anybody else who was using the software. In addition to text, mobile users' posts were able to include an uploaded photo. Platforms supported were limited to devices running Android 1.6+, iOS, Windows Mobile, Openwave and S60.

== History ==
Google Buzz was announced on February 9, 2010, in a press conference at the company's Mountain View headquarters and launched on the same day, at 11 a.m. PT for the first set of users. The feature, available from the Gmail inbox, was rolled out to Gmail accounts in the following weeks. A mobile version of the site optimized for Android phones and Apple's iPhone was also launched, while a version for businesses and schools that use Google Apps was only planned. Within 56 hours of its release, 9 million posts were made on Google Buzz — approximately 160,000 posts and comments per hour.

On October 14, 2011, Google announced that Google Buzz would be shut down together with the Buzz API "in a few weeks", in order to focus on Google+ instead. Bradley Horowitz, Google's Vice President, Product, explained the ramifications, "While people obviously won't be able to create new posts after that, they will be able to view their existing content on their Google Profile and download it using Google Takeout". He also said, "We learned a lot from products like Buzz and are putting that learning to work every day in our vision for products like Google+".

It was discontinued on December 15, 2011 and all content users saved on the service were saved to the user's Google Drive.

Google+ was shut down on April 2, 2019. Google cited low user engagement and software security issues for the shutdown.

== Privacy ==
At launch, Google's decision to opt-in its user base with weak privacy settings caused a breach of user information and garnered significant criticism. One feature in particular that was widely criticized as a severe privacy flaw was that by default Google Buzz publicly disclosed (on the user's Google profile) a list of the names of Gmail contacts that the user has most frequently emailed or chatted with. Users who failed to disable this feature (or did not realize that they had to) could have sensitive information about themselves and their contacts revealed. This was later adjusted so that users had to explicitly add information that they want public.

Google Profiles existed before Buzz and could be set by the user to be public or not. After Buzz was released, the last name field was required to be non empty and profiles set not to be indexed became indexed for a profile search.

A 2010 New York Times article characterized Google as being "known for releasing new products before they are fully ready and then improving them over time". Google twice tried to address privacy concerns: first by making the option to disable public sharing of contact lists more prominent and later by changing one of Buzz's features from "auto-follow" to "auto-suggest". This allowed users complete control over whom they follow and, therefore, who was revealed on their public list of contacts. These changes to the way that Google Buzz operates were, however, criticized as inadequate and the company was criticized for failing to take its users' privacy concerns seriously.

Among other initial problems, users who had never created a Google profile had no way to make their list of contacts or other information private, which resulted in negative publicity from a case involving information about a woman's current workplace and partner being shared with her abusive ex-husband.

Concerns were also raised that because the mobile version of Google Buzz by default published the user's exact location when they posted a message to the service, users might unintentionally reveal sensitive locations.

=== Legal issues ===
On February 16, 2010, Eva Hibnick, a student at Harvard Law School, filed a class action lawsuit against Google, alleging that Buzz violated several federal laws meant to protect privacy. On the same day, the Electronic Privacy Information Center (EPIC) filed a complaint with the Federal Trade Commission alleging that Google Buzz "violated user expectations, diminished user privacy, contradicted Google's privacy policy, and may have violated federal wiretap laws".

Also on February 16, 2010, the Electronic Frontier Foundation wrote "These problems arose because Google attempted to overcome its market disadvantage in competing with Twitter and Facebook by making a secondary use of your information. Google leveraged information gathered in a popular service (Gmail) with a new service (Buzz) and set a default to sharing your email contacts to maximize uptake of the service. In the process, the privacy of Google users was overlooked and ultimately compromised."

On February 17, 2010, the Privacy Commissioner of Canada, Jennifer Stoddart, issued a statement on Buzz:

We have seen a storm of protest and outrage over alleged privacy violations and my office also has questions about how Google Buzz has met the requirements of privacy law in Canada...My office has a variety of resources available to help companies build privacy into their products and services. When companies consult with us at the development stage, they can avoid the problems we've seen in recent days.

— Jennifer Stoddart

On November 2, 2010, Google e‑mailed Gmail users to tell them about the outcome of the lawsuit. As part of its settlement, Google agreed to create an $8.5 million fund to award money to groups that promote privacy education on the web, of which the prosecuting lawyers are requesting 25% ($2,125,000) "plus reimbursement of costs and expenses". The settlement was finally approved in June 2011.

On March 30, 2011, the Federal Trade Commission announced a settlement with Google regarding Buzz. In the announcement, the FTC agreed with the EPIC complaint that Google had violated its privacy policies by using information provided for Gmail for another purpose - social networking - without obtaining consumers’ permission in advance. The FTC also alleged that Google misrepresented that it was treating personal information from the European Union in accordance with the US-EU Safe Harbor privacy framework. The FTC stated that "The proposed settlement bars the company from future privacy misrepresentations, requires it to implement a comprehensive privacy program and calls for regular, independent privacy audits for the next 20 years." In response to the announcement that Google agreed to adopt a "Comprehensive Privacy Plan", EPIC launched a campaign, called "Fix Google Privacy", to encourage Internet users to offer their suggestions to improve safeguards for Google's products and services. Subsequently, in United States v. Google Inc., the FTC alleged that Google had violated this settlement agreement by misrepresenting privacy assurances to users of Apple's Safari web browser.

== Reception ==
Both the general and technical press were critical of Buzz and the manner in which it was implemented. The Canadian Broadcasting Corporation described Buzz's arrival as having "ignited a hailstorm of criticism". CBC indicated "One user blogged about how Buzz automatically added her abusive ex-boyfriend as a follower and exposed her communications with a current partner to him. Other bloggers commented that repressive governments in countries such as China or Iran could use Buzz to expose dissidents".

PCWorld’s JR Raphael criticized Buzz for both its intrusive nature and privacy concerns, citing above all that it merely adds "more noise into an already buzzing area of my life". Raphael provided a tutorial on how to disable Buzz.

Ryan Paul of Ars Technica noted "there isn't much in Buzz that is new or original" and "the end result is a service that shows promise but lacks the requisite killer feature or innovative twist that it will need in order to truly keep people engaged".

== See also ==
- Comparison of microblogging and similar services
- Criticism of Google
