= Socialwok =

- Type: Private start-up
- Industry: Business Social Networking, Enterprise collaboration software, microblogging, Cloud based Content Management
- Founded: September 2009
- Headquarters: Avon CT, Singapore
- Key people: Ming Yong, Navin Kumar, Vikram Rangnekar
- Website: www.socialwok.com

Socialwok was a business social networking service launched in September 2009. Socialwok integrates with Google Apps and Google accounts. The service provides a feed-based format for users to share ideas, files, documents and calendars using rich media status updates. According to the homepage, the service was shut down on July 12, 2011.

== History ==
On 10 September 2009, Socialwok won the TechCrunch50 Demopit award. It was the first Singapore-based company to do so. Five days later, on 15 September 2009, the service launched at the TechCrunch50 conference.

In July 12, 2011, Socialwok was acquired by Mindjet.

== Service ==
Socialwok is built on Google App Engine, Google's cloud computing service.
