= AliveCor =

American medical device and AI company

AliveCor, Inc.
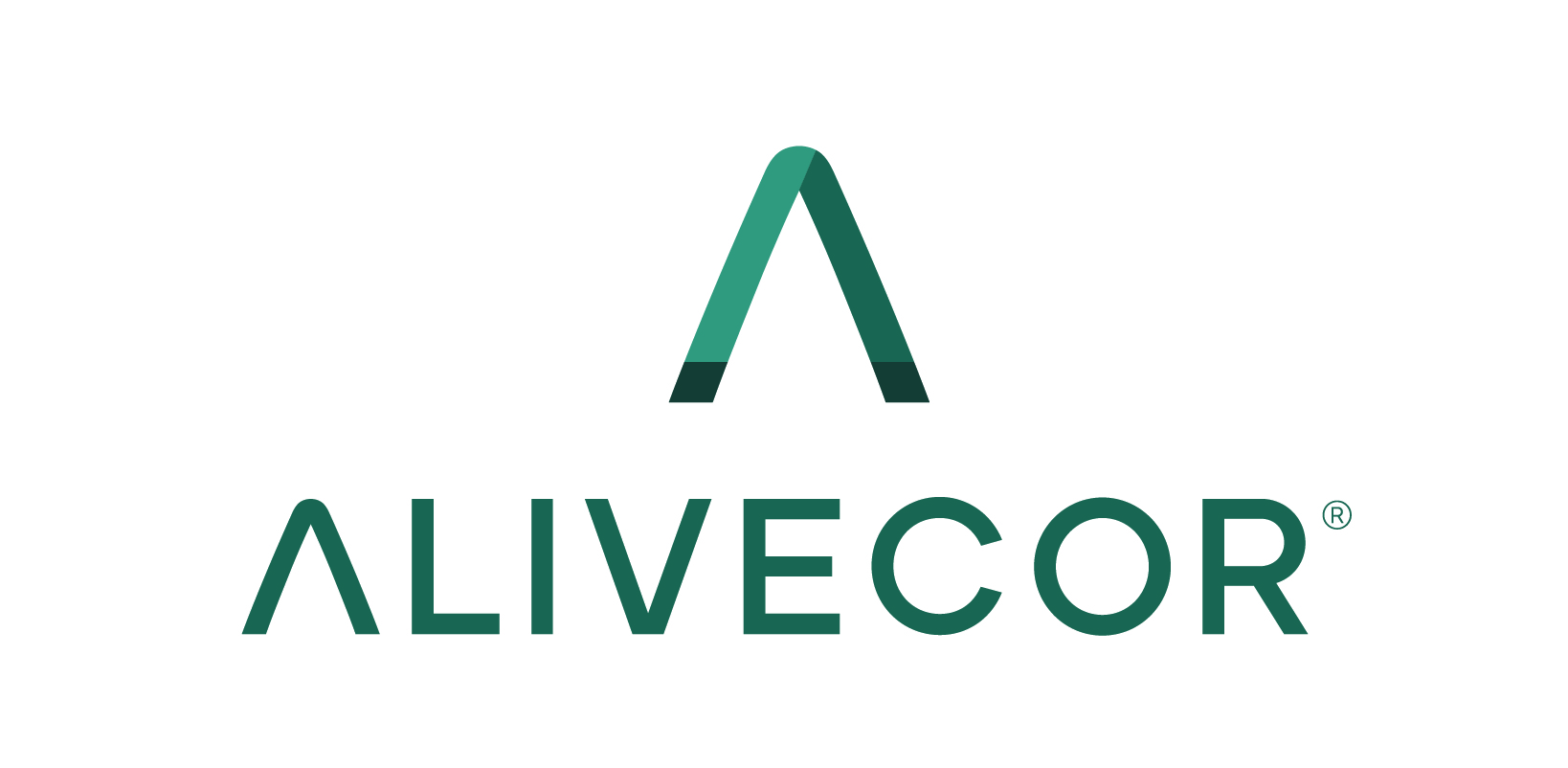
- Type: Private
- Industry: Medical Devices, Artificial Intelligence
- Founded: 2011
- Founders: David Albert, Bruce Satchwell, Kim Barnett
- Headquarters: Mountain View, California
- Key people: Priya Abani, CEO; David Albert, Chief Medical Officer
- Number of employees: 150
- Website: alivecor.com

AliveCor is a medical device and AI company that develops ECG hardware and software compatible with consumer mobile devices to enable remote heart rhythm monitoring and detection of abnormal heart rhythms, or arrhythmias. AliveCor was founded in 2011 and is headquartered in Mountain View, California, the United States.

== History ==
The company was co-founded in 2011 by David Albert, a medical doctor and former chief clinical scientist of cardiology at General Electric, along with scientists Bruce Satchwell and Kim Barnett. Albert began working on ECGs for handheld computers in 1990, after an early palm top computer was released by Hewlett-Packard. [source missing] Their work led to a 1998 patent for wireless transmission of ECGs in handheld devices.

In December 2010, Albert demonstrated a prototype of an iPhone ECG through a YouTube video. After the video received attention from the media, Albert was approached by venture capitalists and industry partners to fund the new company. AliveCor received its first $3 million in financing in 2011.

In 2011, AliveCor finalized the design of the AliveCor iPhone ECG, a single-lead ECG device that attaches to either the iPhone 4 or iPhone 4S as a phone case. This device gained FDA approval in 2012, and it was available for sale only to doctors for $200. To secure the FDA-clearance, AliveCor ran a clinical trial to test both the device hardware and the associated iPhone app. The study investigated how the single-lead ECG compared to a traditional 12-lead device. A second study looked at whether 54 participants with no medical training could determine how to use the phone case to record ECG's on themselves and others. The latter study revealed two subjects with serious heart conditions. This iPhone case ECG was not approved for over-the-counter (OTC) sales as of December 2012, although AliveCor was seeking such approval from the FDA. The AliveCor iPhone ECG case does not fit on the iPhone 5 due to the change in geometry of the phone, and it would need further FDA approval to be used with the iPhone 5.

In October of 2013, AliveCor announced a new ECG device that would, for the first time, support Android devices. This new device would no longer need to fit the smartphone perfectly, because it was not a smartphone case. Rather, it was a flat rectangle slightly larger than a stick of gum. This device was eventually marketed as the first-generation Kardia Mobile. It was sold directly to patients.

The KardiaMobile single-lead device requires placing one fingertip from each hand on its two electrodes (metal sensor pads) for 30 seconds, allowing the device to collect a medical-grade ECG reading. The resulting single-lead ECG recording is equivalent to lead I from a 12-lead ECG. In a randomized controlled trial conducted in the UK, patients given an AliveCor EKG device to use at home were significantly more likely than control group patients to receive a timely and correct diagnosis of atrial fibrillation (AF). The 500 treatment-group patients recorded 60,440 EKGs at home throughout the study, and 76% of these were interpreted as "normal" (not AF) by the Kardia app's automated algorithm. None of these readings were found to show AF when reviewed by cardiologists, representing a 0% false negative rate. However, the false positive rate was 95%, meaning that the automated software often reported atrial fibrillation in cases where the cardiologist concluded there was no AF. The recording can be analyzed in a rudimentary fashion within the iPhone app, and it can be saved locally on the phone. Additional services are available for additional fees: the data can be sent to AliveCor for storage in the cloud, it can be transmitted to the patient's own physician, or it can be interpreted professionally by a cardiologist who is board certified in the United States, or in certain other countries. As of March 2017, the Kardia Mobile device sells for $100.

While its first-generation ECG devices relied on medical professionals to analyze readings, in 2015, the company received FDA clearance to have the device itself instantly notify the user if certain heart rhythm abnormalities were detected.

The company appointed former Google and Microsoft executive Vic Gundotra as its CEO in November 2015.

In 2017, the company introduced software that used a neural network to build a profile of the user's ECG patterns over the course of about a month. Then later, if something changes, the device can alert the patient's doctor of a potential abnormality even if couldn't make a specific diagnosis.

By the end of 2017, the FDA had cleared the KardiaBand ECG reader as a medical device accessory to the Apple Watch. The KardiaBand had been approved for use in Europe earlier in the year. A study by the Cleveland Clinic showed the KardiaBand could distinguish between atrial fibrillation and a normal heart rhythm with 93 percent sensitivity and 94 percent specificity; sensitivity increased to 99 percent with physician review of the reading.

After Gunotra departed in February 2018, Ira Bahr was appointed as interim CEO.

In 2019, the company ended sales of the KardiaBand ECG reader.

Priya Abani joined AliveCor as CEO in 2019.

=== Lawsuits involving Apple ===
In December 2020, AliveCor sued Apple, alleging that Apple Watch Series 4, 5, and 6 infringed three of its patents by copying technologies used in the KardiaBand ECG reader. Then in April 2021, AliveCor filed a complaint with the U.S. International Trade Commission (ITC), alleging infringement of the same three patents, and asked the ITC to block Apple from importing Apple Watches manufactured overseas. The following month, AliveCor filed a federal antitrust lawsuit against Apple, claiming Apple sought to monopolize the heartrate analysis market by changing the watch's operating system to be incompatible with rival technologies.

On December 2, 2022, Apple sued AliveCor, claiming AliveCor copied technologies Apple had developed in 2008, two years before AliveCor was founded, and therefore its patent rights had been violated. On December 6, the U.S. Patent and Trademark Office (USPTO) invalidated the three AliveCor patents in response to an earlier request by Apple. On December 22, the ITC ruled that Apple Watch infringed two of the three patents, and that their import should be banned. The Biden administration was given 60 days to decide whether to veto the ruling, and a $2.00 per unit bond for was set for watches imported or sold during the review period. However, the ITC suspended enforcement of both the import ban and bond assessment pending the outcome of appeals challenging the USPTO decision. President Biden upheld the ITC ruling in February 2023 – the first ITC ruling against Apple to clear presidential review. In June '24 US Customs and Border Protection found that the newly designed Apple Watch does not infringe any of the AliveCor patents in the original ITC case.

In June 2023, a U.S. district court judge ruled against AliveCor in its 2021 antitrust lawsuit against Apple, but AliveCor's unfair competition claim against Apple is ongoing as of September 2023. Both parties were scheduled to return to court in October 2023 for dispositive motions. In February 2024, the federal judge ruled in Apple’s favor and dismissed the antitrust lawsuit. AliveCor said it plans to appeal the ruling.

== Products ==
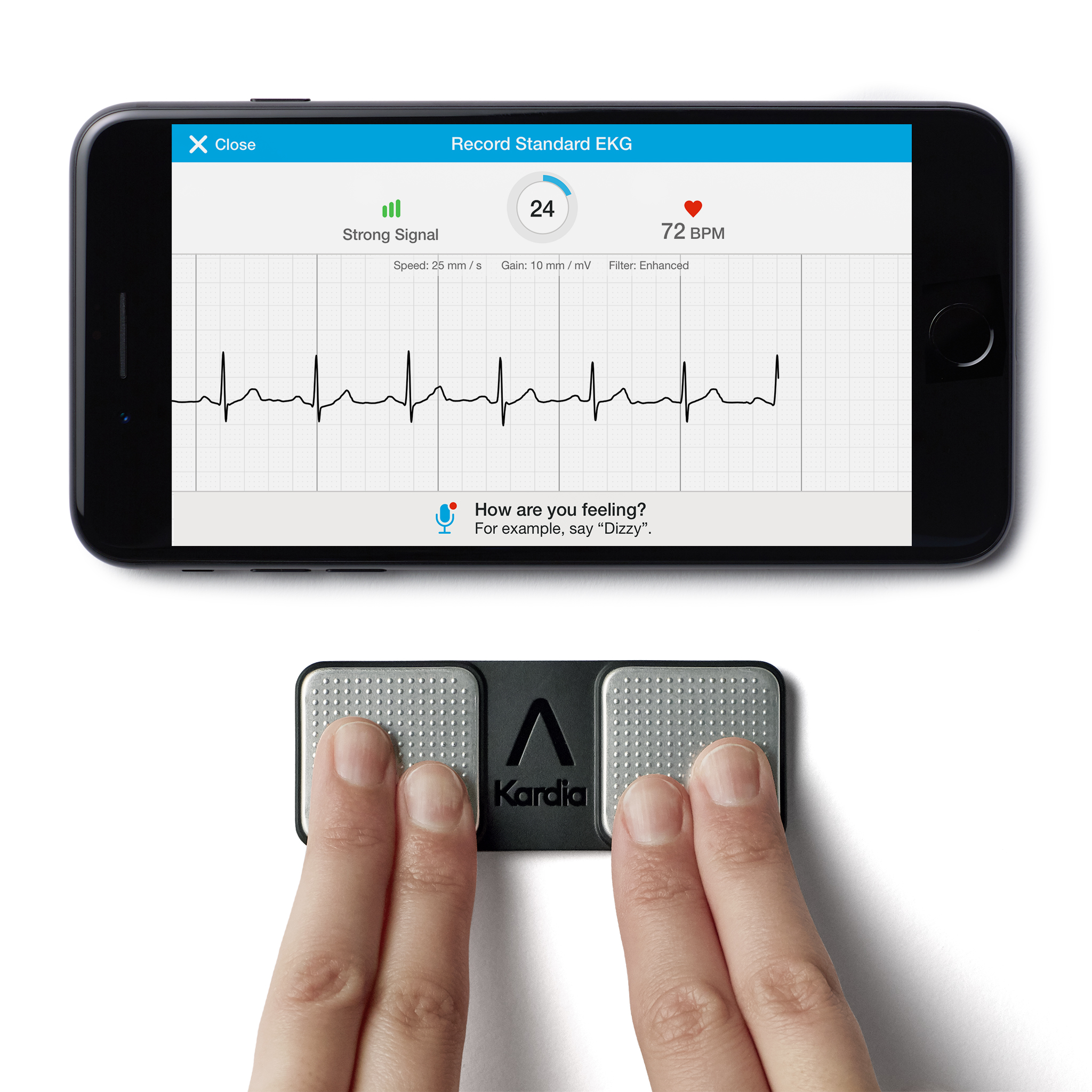
KardiaMobile

- KardiaMobile – KardiaMobile is a smartphone-connected ECG recorder for personal use The user places their fingertips on a device the size of a stick of chewing gum for about 30 seconds to record an ECG on their smartphone. The results can be read by the user or sent to a physician for analysis. KardiaMobile was cleared by the FDA in 2012 for detecting atrial fibrillation and normal sinus rhythm. The KardiaMobile does not use Bluetooth or any form of radio signal to communicate with the smartphone. Rather, it transmits the data as ultrasound (high frequency audio), which is then detected by the microphone on the smartphone.
- KardiaMobile 6L – In 2019, AliveCor received FDA clearance for KardiaMobile 6L, the first six-lead personal ECG device. In 2021, KardiaMobile 6L was cleared by the FDA for healthcare professionals to use to calculate patients’ QTc interval, a heart rate corrected interval that reflects the integrity of the heart's electrical recharging system.
- KardiaMobile Card – In late 2021, AliveCor received FDA clearance for the KardiaMobile Card, a personal ECG device with the size and dimensions of a credit card.
- KardiaCare – KardiaCare is a digital health subscription service that AliveCor introduced in 2020, to provide ECG evaluations and other related services that can be shared with caregivers.
- KardiaComplete – In 2022, AliveCor introduced KardiaComplete, a cardiovascular enterprise service for employers and health insurers to offer to employees and members. The service provides customers with AliveCor's KardiaMobile 6L and Omron’s Evolv blood pressure cuff to monitor their heart health, and includes heart data analyses, health coaching and a virtual assistant.
- KardiaPro – KardiaPro is a platform for doctors to monitor their patients using Kardia devices. The platform alerts doctors when a patient's device detects an abnormality. KardiaPro also tracks patient risk factors, including weight, activity and blood pressure and analyzes them with AI to alert doctors to potential issues.
- AliveCor Labs – In 2021, AliveCor introduced AliveCor Labs, an independent diagnostic testing facility that offers reimbursed cardiac monitoring services to U.S. healthcare providers.
- Kardia 12L – In 2024, AliveCor Announces Dual FDA Clearance of AI Technology That Delivers 35 Cardiac Determinations and First-of-its-Kind Kardia 12L ECG System

== Financing ==
In 2017, AliveCor raised $30 million in series D funding from medical-device maker Omron and the Mayo Clinic, bringing the total raised to date to $43.5 million.

In 2020, the company raised $65 million in series E funding, led by Omron with Khosla Ventures, WP Global Partners, Qualcomm Ventures and Bold Capital Partners.

In 2022, the company announced that it had completed a Series F financing round for an undisclosed amount, led by GE Healthcare with participation from Khosla Ventures, Bold Capital Partners, Qualcomm Ventures, WP Global Partners and Pegasus Tech Ventures.

== See also ==
- Wireless ambulatory ECG
