= Yahoo Research Berkeley =

Research partnership

- Company type: Joint venture
- Industry: Research
- Owners: Yahoo! Inc.; University of California, Berkeley

Yahoo! Research Berkeley is a research partnership between Yahoo! Inc. and the University of California, Berkeley to research and develop social media and mobile media technology and applications that are intended to help people to create, share, and modify media on the Internet. Yahoo! Research Labs - Berkeley is meant to combine the resources of Yahoo! with the researchers of the university. This creates a corporate-academic collaboration for research and development.
