= Vic Gundotra =

Indian-born American businessman (born 1969)

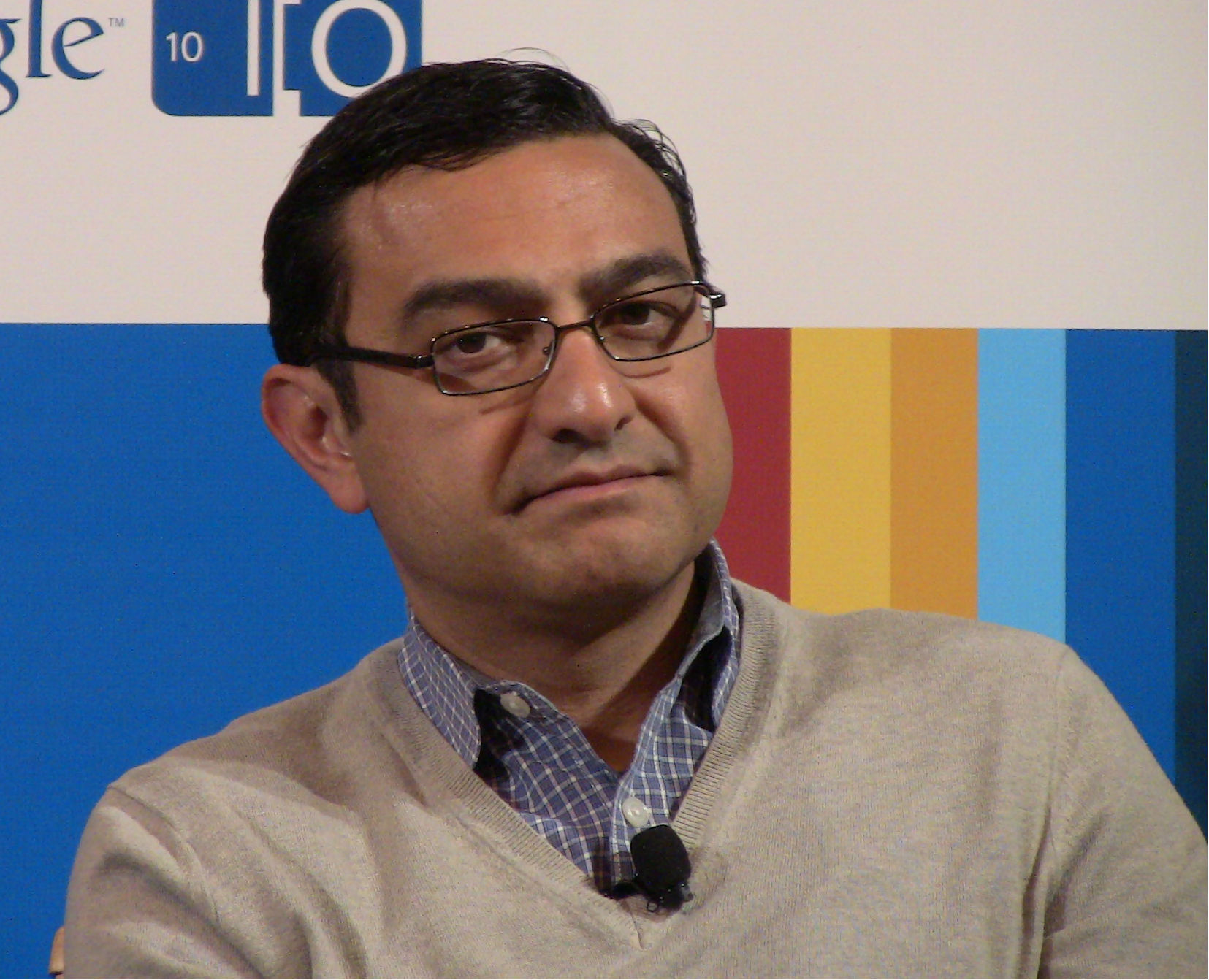
- Vic Gundotra at the Google I/O event 2010
- Born: Vivek Paul Gundotra; 14 June 1969 (age 57); Mumbai, India
- Education: Indian Institute of Technology Madras
- Occupations: Chief Executive Officer, Alivecor, Inc. Ex. Senior Vice President, Social, Google
- Spouse: Claudia Gundotra

Vivek Paul "Vic" Gundotra (born 14 June 1969) is an Indian-born American businessman who served as the Senior Vice President, Social for Google until 24 April 2014. Prior to joining Google, he was a general manager at Microsoft.

== Career ==
Gundotra joined Microsoft in 1991 and eventually became General Manager of Platform Evangelism. His duties included promoting Microsoft's APIs and platforms to independent developers and helping to develop a strategy for Windows Live online services to compete with Google's web-based software applications.

Gundotra joined Google in June 2007, after taking a one-year delay due to a Microsoft employee non-compete agreement.

His responsibilities as Vice-President of Social included Google's social networking and identity service, Google+. He is widely believed to be the man behind Google+, and was responsible for the controversial removal of social features from Google Reader. Apart from Google+, he is widely credited for his contributions to early versions of the mobile version of Google Maps, making advertising videos for Mercedes, and Google I/O.

On 24 April 2014, Gundotra announced his resignation from Google after almost 7 years of service. About a year later, accusations were made about his sexual harassment of at least one employee at Google.

On 11 November 2015, Vic Gundotra announced on his Google+ profile that he was joining AliveCor as its CEO. On 17 January 2019, Gundotra stepped down as CEO of AliveCor for personal reasons.

== Awards and recognition ==
In 2003, Gundotra was named in the MIT Technology Review TR100 as one of the top 100 innovators in the world under the age of 35, for his contribution to Microsoft's .NET Framework.

== Personal life ==
Gundotra is a convert to Catholicism from a background in the Jehovah's Witnesses and later atheism.
