= Bradley Horowitz =

American businessman

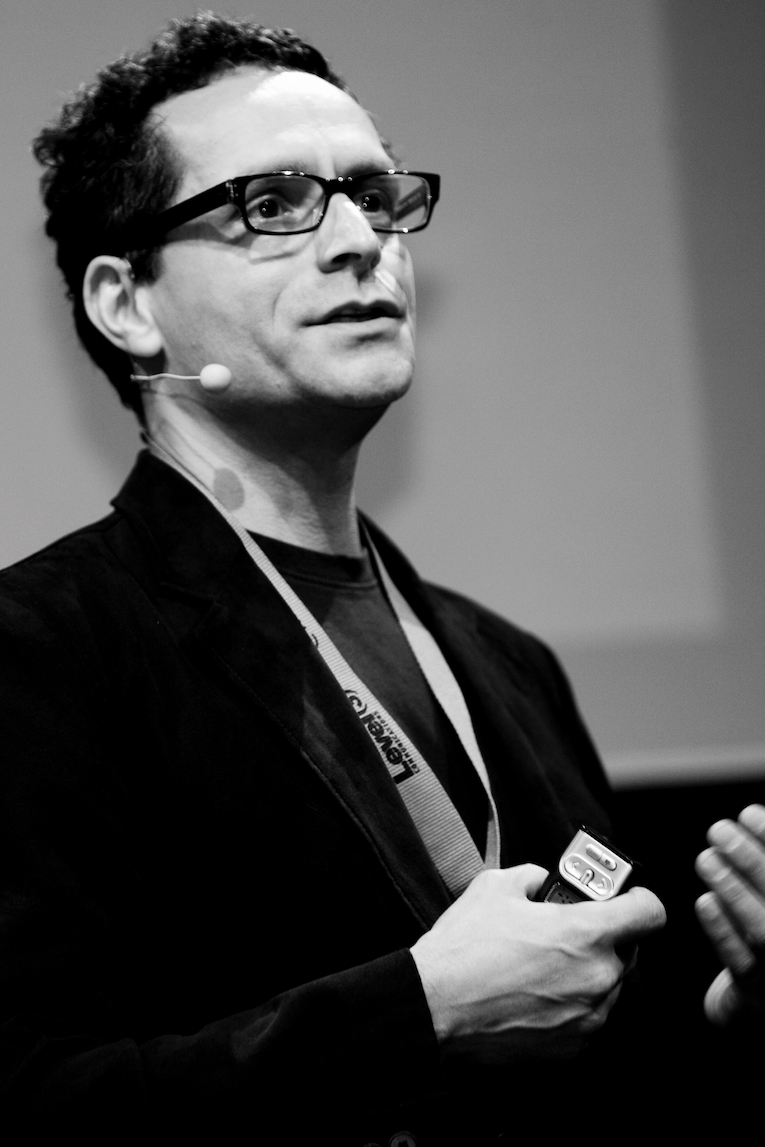
- Horowitz
- Born: Bradley Joseph Horowitz; May 8, 1965 (age 61); Dearborn, Michigan
- Education: University of Michigan
- Occupations: VP, Google
- Spouse: Irene Au

Bradley Joseph Horowitz is an American entrepreneur and internet executive. He was a vice president at Google.

== Early life and education ==
Horowitz was born in Dearborn, Michigan.

Horowitz received a Bachelor of Science in computer science from the University of Michigan in 1989.

He pursued his graduate studies at the MIT Media Lab, in the Vision and Modeling Group, under Professor Sandy Pentland. He received a Master of Science in Media Arts and Sciences in 1991, and subsequently entered the PhD program. He dropped out of the PhD program in 1993 to co-found Virage. Horowitz's academic work focused on the intersection of computer vision, image processing and computer graphics. He has published numerous refereed papers in academic journals, including work on recovery of non-rigid structure from motion and fractal image compression, and has been awarded more than a dozen patents.

== Career ==
Horowitz joined Yahoo in 2004 as Director of Media Search. Eventually he began the internal Hack Yahoo program, most notable for "Hack Days." Hack Days eventually morphed into the public facing Open Hack Days, including Beck's appearance at Yahoo's Sunnyvale campus in 2006. Eventually he was promoted to Vice President of Advanced Development, and his team created both Yahoo Research Berkeley and the Brickhouse incubator. Horowitz is also known for sponsoring numerous "Web 2.0" acquisitions into Yahoo, including Flickr, MyBlogLog and Jumpcut.

Horowitz left Yahoo and joined Google in 2008 as vice president of product for consumer applications, eventually leading the product management organizations for Gmail, Google Docs, Calendar, Google Talk, Google Voice, Picasa, Orkut and Blogger. In 2011, Horowitz and Vic Gundotra conceived of and led the Google+ Project. In March 2015, he became the lead for the Google Photos and Streams products.

Horowitz serves on the Visiting Committee of the MIT Media Lab.

== Entrepreneurship ==
Horowitz was CTO and a co-founder (with Jeff Bach, Chiao-fe Shu and Ramesh Jain) of Virage, Inc. Virage technology "watched, read and listened to raw video," extracting metadata that allowed for detailed semantic-based indexing of the video content. Virage went public on the NASDAQ in 2000, and was acquired by Autonomy in 2003. Horowitz acquired half a dozen patents in the field of media analysis and indexing while at Virage.

== Personal life ==
Horowitz is married to designer Irene Au, who has held executive roles with Netscape, Yahoo, Google and Udacity. Au is currently a design partner at Khosla Ventures.
